= Quebec, County Durham =

Village in County Durham, England

Quebec
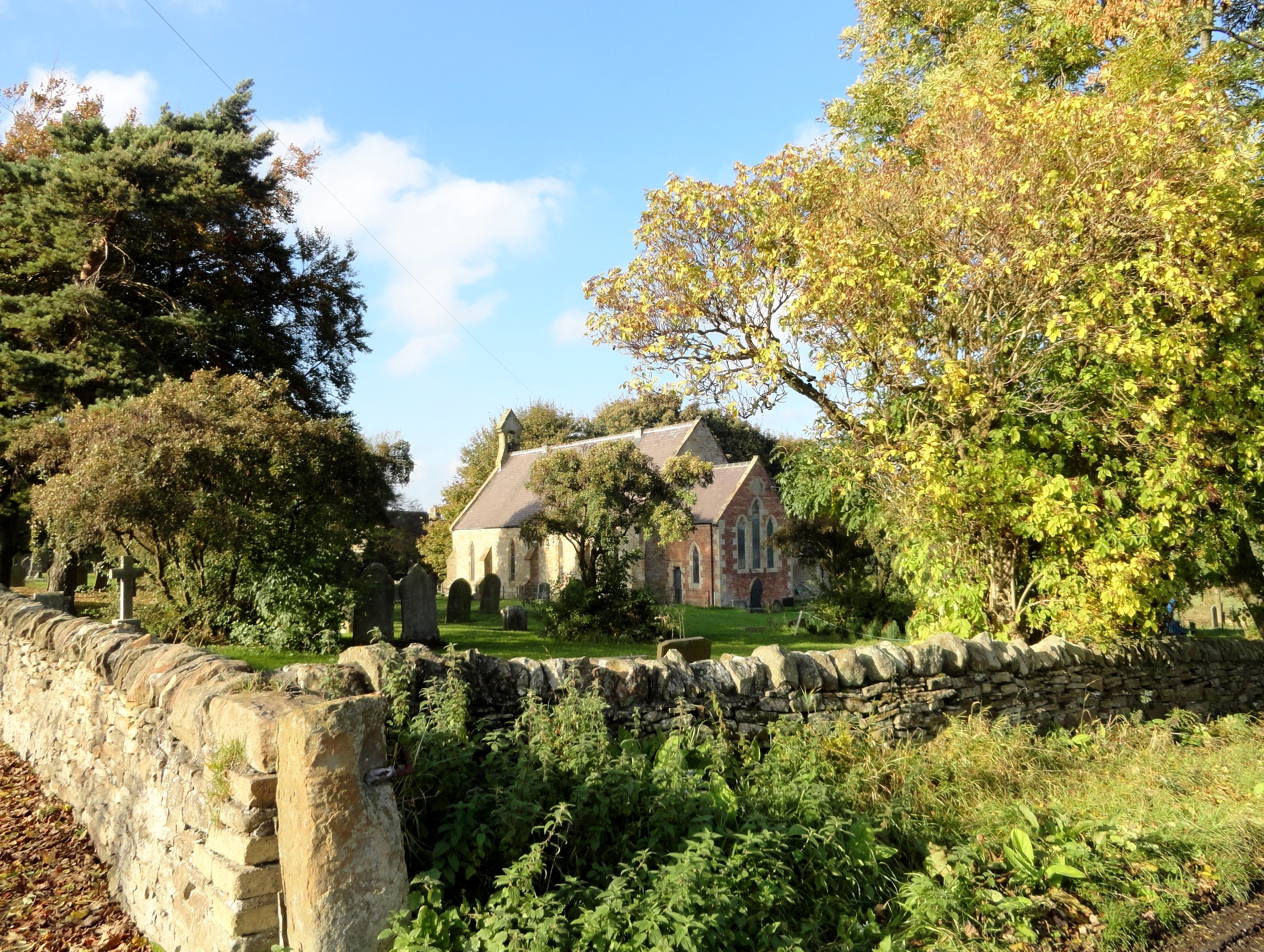
- St John the Baptist Church

- Location within County Durham
- Unitary authority: County Durham
- Ceremonial county: County Durham
- Region: North East
- Country: England
- Sovereign state: United Kingdom
- Police: Durham
- Fire: County Durham and Darlington
- Ambulance: North East

Quebec is a small village in County Durham, in North East England. Once a coal mining village, it is situated 6 miles (10 km) west of the city of Durham, and close to the villages of Esh, Cornsay Colliery, Esh Winning and Langley Park.

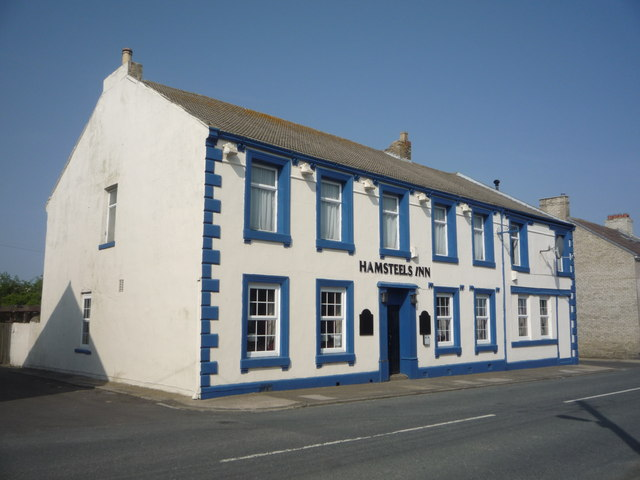
The former Hamsteels Inn, now a tearoom

The village has a tearoom, a hotel (Hamsteels Hall), St John the Baptist Church, a village hall, a playground and a used car dealership.

== Etymology ==
The village takes its unusual name from the more famous city of Quebec, Canada. The fields in the area were enclosed in 1759, the year Quebec was captured from France. It was common at the time for fields distant from their home farm to be given the names of foreign lands, and cases where these names have come to be applied to whole villages are numerous throughout the North East of England. For example, not far away is the village of Toronto.

== History ==
The Roman road known as Dere Street passes through the village on its way from Yorkshire to Hadrian's Wall via the Roman fort at Lanchester.

== Geography ==
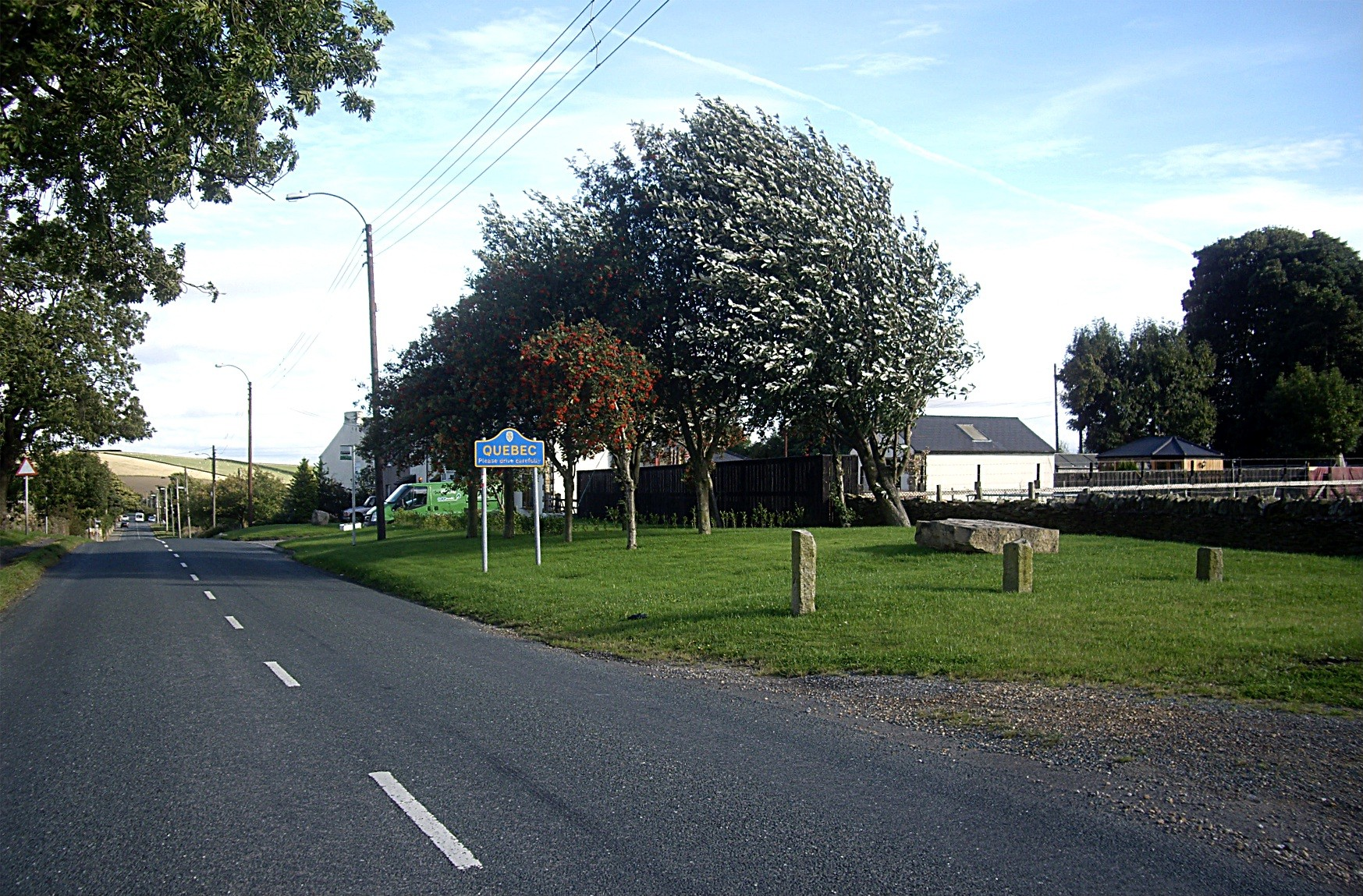
Entering Quebec

- Grid reference: NZ181436
- Latitude and longitude: 54°47′N 1°43′W (54.78, −1.72)
- Elevation: 650 feet (200 m)
- Road access: Minor roads off B6301 and B6302
- Rail access: Durham, 6 miles (10 km) by road
- Nearest large village: Esh Winning, 2 miles (3 km)
- Nearest city: Durham, 6 miles (10 km)

== Administration ==
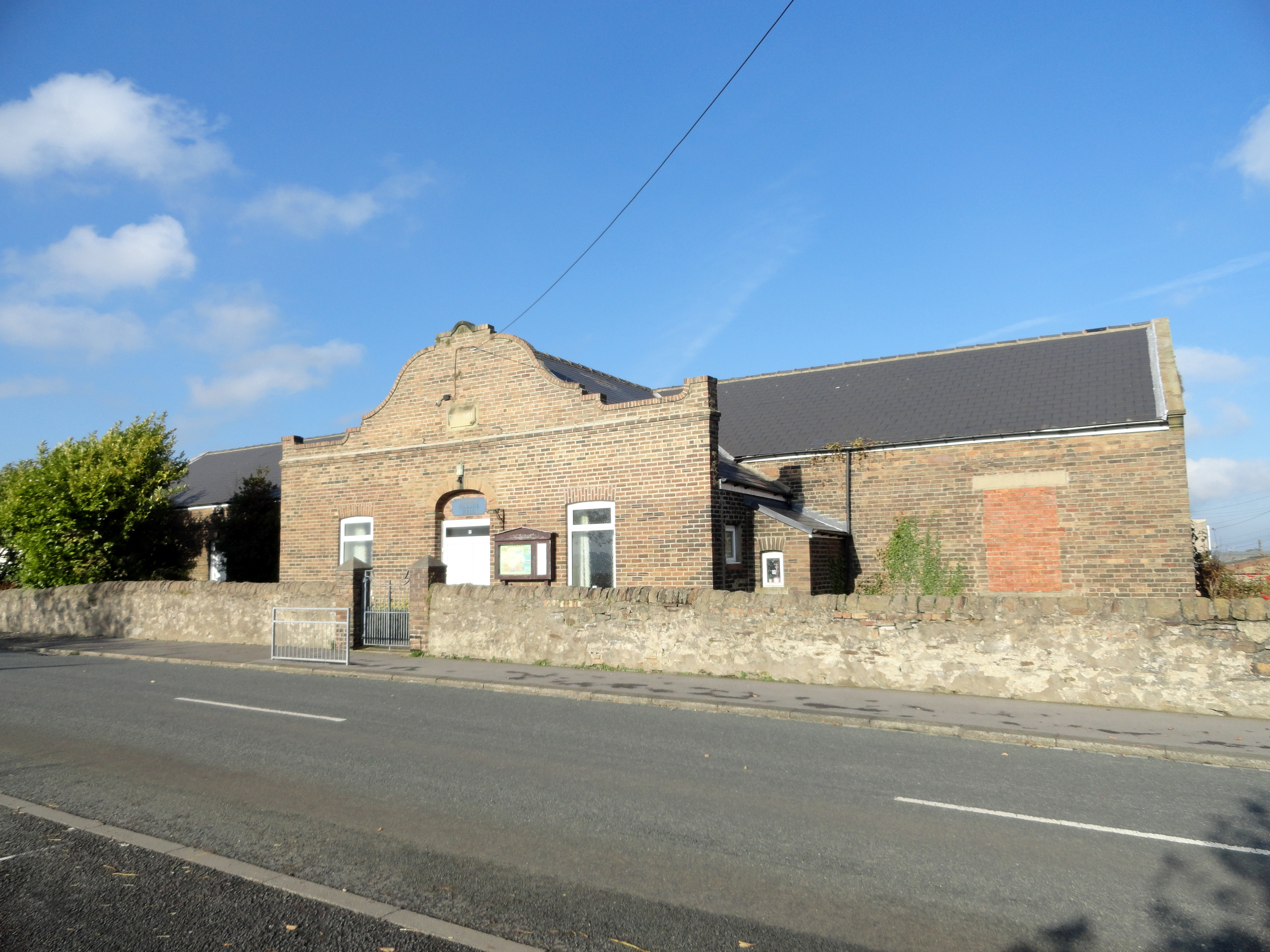
Village hall

=== Civic ===
Quebec is for all purposes (historic, ceremonial and administrative) located in County Durham. The local police force is Durham Constabulary.

=== Political ===
Quebec is located in County Durham. It is in the Esh and Witton Gilbert ward, which as of 2023 is represented on Durham County Council by Bev Coult and Arnie Simpson (Lib Dem). It is part of the North West Durham parliamentary constituency, which is represented in Parliament by Richard Holden, the constituency’s first Conservative MP. It is in the North East England region, which served as a constituency for the European Parliament until the United Kingdom left the European Union at the end of January 2020.

== Sport ==
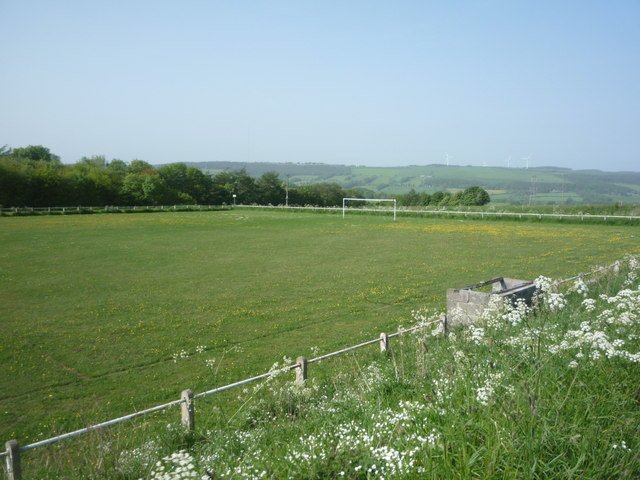
Football pitch

In 1902, after the village's Hamsteels Rugby Club was beaten 77-0 in a match at Quebec against Hartlepool Rovers, the West Hartlepool Mail's rugby correspondent described Quebec as an "outlandish place". Today, the village has only football teams. Two of these, Hamsteels Inn FC and the Hammers FC, play at Quebec's Hamsteels Colliery Welfare Ground, while a third, Steelers FC, is based in Langley Park.

At the age of 20, Chris Waddle was working in Quebec's former meat factory, Hamsteels Frozen Foods, when he was signed by Newcastle United in 1980 from nearby Northern League side Tow Law Town for £1,000.
