= Browney rail crash =

Railway crash in the United Kingdom

Browney train crash
- Location of the crash in County Durham

Details
- Date: 5 January 1946; 5:40 am
- Location: Browney, County Durham
- Coordinates: 54.740°N 1.604°W
- Country: England
- Line: East Coast Main Line
- Operator: LNER
- Cause: Broken coupling

Statistics
- Trains: 2
- Deaths: 10
- Injured: 18

The Browney train crash occurred near to the Browney signal box on the East Coast Main Line, County Durham, England on 5 January 1946. A southbound goods train split in two, with the rear portion accelerating downhill and crashing into the front portion of the train, which had been stopped by the signaller to inform the driver that the train was split into two. The wreckage of the goods train was then hit by an express train heading north from London King's Cross, killing ten people and seriously wounding 18 others.

== Accident ==
A goods train hauling vacuum-braked wagons, left Low Fell in Gateshead at 4:30 am, southwards for Doncaster, on 5 January 1946. The train was signalled to proceed south on the East Coast Main Line. Just south of Durham railway station, a signal was at danger adjacent to Bridge House signal box. The relief operator for the signal box at Ferryhill, 7 miles (11 km) south, got on the train telling the driver of his destination and informed him that this was an official journey. When the train restarted, the signalman at Bridge House box, saw that the train had split between the seventh and eighth wagons, and so notified the signaller in the next box south (Browney) about the train being divided. The front portion of the train (that under power) was stopped at Browney Signal Box, which was at milepost 63 - 3 miles (5 km) south of Durham, and 19 miles (31 km) north of Darlington.

The notification of train divided was received at Browney Signal Box at 5:30 am, just after the signalman at Browney had indicated Line Clear for the express running in the down (opposite) direction, towards Newcastle. The signalman at Browney halted the goods train at his signal box believing that the rear portion of the train would come to a stand on the rising gradient near to Littleburn Signal Box, which was the only level or rising gradient in section of steep downhill gradients between Bridge House and Browney Signal Boxes. However, whilst the fireman was leaving the train to talk with the signaller about why they were halted, they saw the lights of the broken free wagons approaching at speed, and the driver did not have time to start his engine to get out of the way. The runaway wagons collided with the stationary front wagons and caused wreckage to be strewn across both running lines (up and down), which was then hit by an overnight express train from London King's Cross to Newcastle, which was estimated to have been travelling at 50 miles per hour (80 km/h). The first three coaches of the passenger train were destroyed and the crash was said to have been heard 2 miles (3.2 km) away. The driver of the express stated that the signals were clear, and the first he knew of any problem was when his engine started "screeching". Then it pitched violently onto its side. Both the driver and the fireman of the express escaped.

The crash caused the deaths of ten people on the passenger train, and additionally, one soldier died after the event from alcoholic poisoning. The soldier had been drafted in from the nearby Brancepeth Army Camp, and was helping with the rescue effort. He had been drinking the spirits carried in one of the broken goods wagons. The then home secretary, James Chuter Ede, was on the wrecked express, but he was uninjured and managed to go to his constituency in South Shields for work that same day. The line was cleared of wreckage and had a normal service by 7 January 1946, and an inquest was opened on 9 January at Durham, where it was called the Ferryhill Crash.

== Aftermath ==
Hall comments that the signalman at Browney should have made the train proceed further south towards Croxdale, which is on a rising gradient, so the runaway rear portion of the train would come to a halt. At the inquest, the investigating officer stated as much, but the signaller decided against this for three reasons; he thought the rear portion would stop on the level section by Littleburn Signal Box, he wanted to avoid the possibility of a collision on Croxdale Viaduct, and if he prevented the train going further south, then the wreckage would not foul his signalling system.

The son of one of the victims of the crash, arranged a remembrance service at Durham Cathedral in January 2016, 70 years after the event.
