= Connie Lewcock =

British suffragette, arsonist and socialist

Constance Lewcock OBE
- Connie Lewcock in Westminster Hall in 1978
- Born: 11 April 1894; Horncastle, Lincolnshire, England
- Died: 11 November 1980 (aged 86); Newcastle upon Tyne, England
- Education: Queen Elizabeth’s Grammar School, Horncastle
- Occupation: Politician
- Organization: Women's Social and Political Union
- Political party: Independent Labour Party
- Children: 3

Constance Mary Lewcock OBE (née Ellis, 11 April 1894 – 11 November 1980) was a British suffragette, arsonist and socialist. She campaigned with the Women's Social and Political Union (WSPU) and the Independent Labour Party.

== Life ==
Lewcock was born on 11 April 1894 in Horncastle, Lincolnshire. Her parents were Thomas Henry Ellis and Emily Mary Lessware.

Lewcock was educated at Queen Elizabeth's Grammar School, Horncastle. She moved to Esh Winning in 1912 to work as a teacher.

In 1913, Lewcock volunteered her services to the Women's Social and Political Union (WSPU) and was initially warned against getting arrested. She learnt about politics by chairing and talking at WSPU meetings across County Durham.

In 1913, Lewcock tried to set alight a pier of Durham Cathedral, but couldn't work out a way of detonating her bomb without harming herself. She later committed what she called the "perfect crime," when in March 1914 she burnt down a railway building at Esh Winning. She had designed a system where a jar of flammable liquid was set alight when a candle burnt down. This meant that by the time the wooden building was alight she was miles away establishing an alibi. She also had the assistance of a miner named Joss Craddock, who she had met at meetings of the Independent Labour Party at Cornsay Colliery. They attended meetings together where he could hold back the stewards whilst she made her point. This meant that Lewcock avoided the bruises that she used to get before they met.

The railway building at Esh Winning burnt down but the Police could not make formal charges as she had over thirty witnesses who could testify that she was with them at the time of the fire. However her employers did not need proof and she was told that she must stop her political actions or give up teaching. She gave up teaching, but this was just as suffragette activity disappeared. That year the WSPU agreed a truce with the government for the period of the war. Lewcock increased her activities for the Independent Labour Party.

She married William Lewcock at Horncastle Congregational Church. He was a regional organiser of the Labour Party from Chopwell and became a conscientious objector during World War I. They had three children together.

From 1960, Lewcock represented the Benwell ward on Newcastle City Council. She ceased working as a councillor in 1971.

Lewcock was appointed an OBE in the New Years Honours List in 1966. In 1978 she was asked to come to Westminster Hall in London, where leading politicians were leading celebrations of the suffragists achievements as it was fifty years since all women had the right to vote.

Lewcock died on 11 November 1980 in Newcastle upon Tyne, after a fall outside her home.

== Oral history ==
Brian Harrison recorded two oral history interviews with Lewcock, in April 1976 and April 1977, as part of the Suffrage Interviews project, titled Oral evidence on the suffragette and suffragist movements: the Brian Harrison interviews. In the 1976 interview Lewcock recalls her childhood and her WSPU work, her political interests and her husband. Elsie Wright, the niece and adopted daughter of Joss Craddock, also took part in the 1977 interview in which Lewcock speaks further about Craddock.

Lewcock was featured in a BBC Two clip, discussing suffragette tactics.

Durham County Record Office (DCRO) holds documents relating to Lewcock's life.

== Commemoration ==
In 2018, Lewcock was recognised on a national list of 100 suffrage pioneers by the Women's Local Government Society.

In 2019, a blue plaque commemorating Lewcock was unveiled at her former school, Queen Elizabeth's Grammar School, Horncastle. She is also commemorated too with a plaque on the Local Heroes Walk of Fame along the Newcastle and Gateshead Quayside.
