= Browney =

Village in United Kingdom

Coordinates: 54°44′52″N 1°37′06″W

Browney is a village in County Durham, England. It is situated to the south-west of Durham and adjoins Meadowfield. It is part of the parish of Brandon and Byshottles.

The Browney Wesleyan Chapel was built in 1887, to seat 270, and cost £400. Browney Colliery (mining) officially closed in 1938. The Browney rail crash of 1946 killed 10 people.

Browney British School (now Browney Academy) was built in 1881 by the colliery owners, and consisted of mixed and infants, with accommodation for 407 in all. The average school attendance was 309 in 1892.

Literacy in Browney

The Browney colliery reading room and library were provided by the owners of the now-closed colliery. The library comprised over 1000 books, and the reading room was supplied with popular newspapers.

This was at a time when popular culture emphasised the benefits of literacy, via the Worker's Educational Movement.

This movement supplemented a relentless drive for self-improvement, involving literacy connected with the Book of Common Prayer, and standard forms of Christian worship.
