= River Deerness =

River in County Durham, England

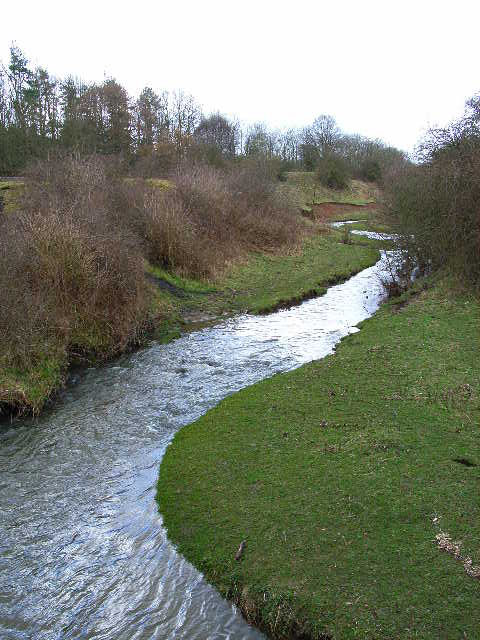
- Deerness near Esh Winning

Location
- Country: England
- Counties: Durham

Physical characteristics
- Source
  - location: Tow Law
  - elevation: 950 feet (290 m)
- Mouth
  - location: River Browney near Langley Moor
  - coordinates: 54.7628°N 1.6053°W
  - elevation: 200 feet (61 m)
- Length: 11.6 mi (18.7 km)

The River Deerness in County Durham, England is a tributary to the River Browney, which is itself a tributary the River Wear. It rises near Tow Law and descends through the Deerness Valley for a distance of 11.6 miles (18.7 km), passing the villages of Waterhouses, Ushaw Moor and Esh Winning. Its confluence with the River Browney is near Langley Moor.

Its tributaries include Stanley Beck, Crow Gill, Cuddy Burn, Hedleyhope Burn, Rowley Burn, Holburn Beck and Red Burn. and its overall catchment area is 53 square kilometres (20 sq mi).

Its name is pre-Celtic and means 'rushing or roaring river'. It may be the oldest place-name in County Durham.

A recent restoration project has improved the water quality and reduced barriers to fish migration along the Deerness.

== Route ==
The River Deerness rises at a spring on the eastern edge of the town of Tow Law, close to the 950-foot (290 m) contour. It flows along a well-defined valley for all of its length, heading in a broadly east-north-easterly direction to a point beyond Esh Winning, and then turning broadly east-south-east to reach its junction with the River Browney. The south bank of the river is soon wooded, and there is a small sewage treatment works which discharges into the river after about 0.6 miles (1 km). After it passes Low West House, set back from the river on the north bank, the south bank becomes wooded and remains so for much of its remaining course. An air shaft and the remains of a drift mine are the first remnants of the industrial history of the valley. East Hedleyhope is a small village on the north bank, and here the woodland spreads briefly to the north bank as well. There are two more sewage treatment works, both on the north bank, while Stanley Wood is located on the south bank, on the northern flanks of Stanley Hill.

Hedleyhill Terrace is located on the north bank, just before the former course of the Dearness Valley Railway approaches from the south and crosses the river. It stays close to the river for most of the rest of its course. The line opened in 1858 to serve the coal mines of the region, but following its closure in 1964, it has become the Deerness Valley Railway Path, part of a network of long distance walkways in the Durham area. The railway bridge was one of two timber trestle viaducts on the branch line, but it was demolished in 1967/68 when the track was lifted, and the path crosses the river on a low level footbridge. Stanley Beck joins the river from the south, having flowed around the south side of Stanley Hill, and then Wolsingham Road crosses the river at the western edge of the village of Waterhouses. There are the remains of several mines in the woods to the south of the river. The large village of Esh Winning is located on the north bank, while two tributaries, Crow Gill and Holburn Beck join from the south. Two footbridges carry the Deerness Valley Railway Path over a loop in the river, and Rowley Burn, which has flowed parallel to the river but further to the north, joins at the eastern end of the village.

The woodland to the south is called Ragpath Wood, and covers 81.5 acres (33 ha) on the steep side of the valley. It is a Planted Ancient Woodland Site, but most of the trees were cut down during the Second World War. It was subsequently replanted with broadleaf and conifer trees in 1967, and was bought by the Woodland Trust in 1996. Species growing in the wood include some oak and birch, with larger populations of European larch, Scots pine, Norway spruce, Sitka spruce, sycamore and beech. The Trust are managing the woodland, and gradually removing some of the conifers, to favour native broadleafed trees, with a view to reducing conifers to about one fifth of the population. Some of the restoration work has been funded by the Heritage Lottery Fund, and public access is encouraged by the maintenance of two bridleways and a public footpath through the woods. The course of the Roman road Dere Street passes through the woods to cross the river as it heads northwards to the site of the Roman fort at Lanchester.

A bridge carries a minor road to the village of New Brancepeth, and the former Deerness Valley Railway crosses to the south bank, where the railway bridge has been replaced by a footbridge. There is a weir, and the course stops its northwards progression, to begin heading gradually southwards. The railway crosses back to the north bank near to Station Road, to the south of the village of Ushaw Moor, with the road continuing over the river and the Red Burn tributary. The Edwardian river bridge was closed on 13 April 2016, when it was found to be suffering from structural defects. As a temporary measure, a Bailey bridge was erected above the bridge in May, but was moved to one side in July, to allow repairs to be made. The work involved replacing the steel truss supporting the deck, and diverting utility services which also crossed the river at this point. The new bridge, costing £1.5 million, was opened on 7 August 2018. There is a ford and a number of footbridges on the next section, before it is crossed by the former course of the Brandon to Bishop Auckland Railway. This is another long distance footpath, and the railway bridge has been replaced by a low level footbridge, to maintain the walkway. Finally, the river passes under the East Coast Main Line and the A690 road in quick succession, to meet the River Browney.

== History ==
Prior to the nineteenth century, the Deerness Valley was sparsely populated, with those who lived in the farms and small villages engaged in agriculture. There had been some small scale extraction of coal from the deposits in the valley, but in 1836 the first commercial coal mine opened at Hedleyhope, and by the end of the century, there were at least 20 mines in operation, served by the railway. Records for 1896 show that there were a total of 6,974 men and boys employed as miners in the valley, with 5,186 working underground and 1,788 working on the surface. In addition to seven types of coal, clay and fireclay were extracted, while at Ushaw Moor and New Brancepeth, deposits of witherite and barites were also exploited.

As the mines opened, the population of the valley increased significantly, with workers arriving from Durham, Cumberland, Northumberland and Westmoreland, as well as from other areas of England and Wales. There were also a number of Irish emigrants, fleeing the famines of the 1840s and 1850s. There were no facilities for these workers, and the mine owners built housing, initially of wood, but gradually replaced by brick and stone dwellings. Schools, chapels and shops followed. While villages such as Waterhouses were described in glowing terms at the time, noting the garden plots, Miners Institute, school and Co-operative Store, sanitation was an issue, and there were outbreaks of typhoid and scarlet fever in the 1890s. There was also a long-running strike at Ushaw Moor from 1881 to 1883, with workers being thrown out of their houses which were then boarded up. Most of the mines closed in the 1950s and 1960s, with the last one being at Esh Winning, which closed in 1968. The population decreased as miners moved to other areas, and some of the housing has been demolished and returned to green fields and wooded areas.

One legacy of such piecemeal development of housing is often the lack of adequate provision of sewers and sewage treatment facilities. In 2013, the first of three major pollution incidents occurred, when sewage overflowed from manholes and found its way into the River Deerness. The incidents were also linked to the death of cattle from Black's Disease, which is caused by an organism often found in sewage. Northumbrian Water sought planning permission to build on online storage facility for sewage and storm water in early 2018, on a site at Alum Waters, to the east of New Brancepeth. The project involved building an underground holding tank with two compartments on the line of an existing sewer. Under normal conditions, the sewage flows through a fairly small part of the tank, but when flows increase, the liquid overflows into the rest of the tank, to be stored until flows return to normal. The tank is 217 feet (66 m) by 98 feet (30 m) with a depth of 6.9 feet (2.1 m) and a capacity of 146,800 cubic feet (4,158 m^{3}). Once constructed, the tank was covered with soil to a depth of between 3.3 and 16.4 feet (1 and 5 m), to allow the field to be used for grazing cattle again. The total cost of the project was £2.6 million, which included the enlargement of some 980 feet (300 m) of sewer pipes, and the work was carried out by ESH & Stantec and Carlow Concrete.

The river has been used as a source of power in the past, and there are three mills that are known to have been driven by its water. The uppermost was Bricket Tile Works, near Ushaw Moor. It is shown on the Ordnance Survey map of 1861, with a sluice on the river and a clay pit nearby, but by 1895, only the sluice remained. The large weir a little further downstream was built after 1896 and before 1920. The other two mills were near New Brancepeth, and were fed from a weir downstream of the Ushaw Moor to New Brancepeth road. A long leat led to Sleet Burn Mill, which was used for grinding corn, and the tail race continued along the south side of the river to feed Primrose Side Mill, which was a bleaching mill. The tail race from this mill rejoined the river. Documentary evidence shows that Sleet Burn Mill was operational in 1747 Both had disappeared by 1896.

Between 2012 and 2015, a number of projects were carried out to remove barriers to the migration of fish on the river. Much of the funding came from the Environment Agency's Catchment Restoration Fund. At Cornsay, water levels in a stepped culvert were altered, and several pools were created to make it easier for fish to reach the culvert. There were plans to remove the 5-foot (1.5 m) vertical weir at Broadgate, but a 40-inch (1,000 mm) gas main crossing the river a little further upstream would have created a new barrier, and so a bypass channel was built instead. At Ushaw Moor, erosion beneath the bridge had been addressed in 1933 by building four concrete steps, with no consideration of their effect on fish migration. A rock ramp was constructed down the steps, with stones and boulders used to create a more natural route for the fish to negotiate the structure. A number of pipe bridges were also removed or altered. In order to monitor the effectiveness of the measures, the movement of key species along the river was monitored by Durham University.

In 2016, Durham University carried out a survey of the migration of brown trout within the river for spawning. 16 fish were fitted with radio transmitters, and their locations were tracked by two remote logging stations on the river, and by manual tracking visits, four times a week, using a large hand-held antenna. Although data about the movement of the fish was collected, the study also revealed that predation by herons is a significant factor, as four of the transmitters were found in heron pellets under a single tree, and another three were found further downstream. Among the pellets there were also passive integrated transponder tags, which had been fitted to fish in 2014 for a different study. In 2017, the Environment Agency released stocks of grayling into the river at Ushaw Moor, part of a larger project which saw some 7,500 of the fish released into rivers in the North East. The fish were reared at Calverton in Nottinghamshire, and the costs of the project were met from the sale of fishing licences.

== Water quality ==
The Environment Agency measure the water quality of the river systems in England. Each is given an overall ecological status, which may be one of five levels: high, good, moderate, poor and bad. There are several components that are used to determine this, including biological status, which looks at the quantity and varieties of invertebrates, angiosperms and fish. Chemical status, which compares the concentrations of various chemicals against known safe concentrations, is rated good or fail.

The water quality of the River Deerness system was as follows in 2019.

Section	Ecological Status	Chemical Status	Length	Catchment	Channel
Deerness from Source to Hedleyhope Burn	Poor	Fail	6.8 miles (10.9 km)	7.30 square miles (18.9 km^{2})	
Hedleyhope Burn from Source to Deerness	Moderate	Fail	6.6 miles (10.6 km)	6.61 square miles (17.1 km^{2})	
Deerness from Hedleyhope Burn to Browney	Poor	Fail	4.8 miles (7.7 km)	6.51 square miles (16.9 km^{2})	

The reasons for the quality being less than good included bankside erosion and physical modification of the channel on the upper river, with sewage discharge affecting the lower river sections. The causes for the quality of the Hedleyhope Burn being less than good were not clearly understood in 2019, and needed further investigation. Like most rivers in the UK, the chemical status changed from good to fail in 2019, due to the presence of polybrominated diphenyl ethers (PBDE) and mercury compounds, neither of which had previously been included in the assessment.

== Bibliography ==
- Halpin, Joe (2004). "Mining in the Deerness Valley Area" (PDF). Durham in Time. Archived (PDF) from the original on 22 October 2019.
- Hudson, Steve (2012). "Catchment Restoration Fund Project Briefing Note" (PDF). RestoreRivers.eu. Archived (PDF) from the original on 12 October 2019.
- Lambeth, Roy; Catford, Nick (26 May 2017). "Waterhouses (Durham) Station". Disused Stations. Archived from the original on 18 November 2017.
- Lothian, Angus (7 August 2017). "Tags under trees tell a tale". Wild Trout Trust. Archived from the original on 25 October 2019.
- LSF (2018). "Alum Waters Flood Alleviation - Carlow Concrete". Light Steel Frame Association. Archived from the original on 23 October 2019.
- Northumbrian Water (2018). "Installation of Underground Sewerage Storm Tank and Associated Works" (PDF). Durham County Council. Archived (PDF) from the original on 23 October 2019.
- Sunderland, David (4 July 2017). "Huge Numbers of Fish Released into North East Rivers". Durham Magazine. Archived from the original on 25 October 2019.
- Woodland Trust (2014). "Ragpath Wood Management Plan 2015-2020" (PDF). Archived (PDF) from the original on 18 October 2019.
