= Brancepeth railway station =

Railway station in County Durham, England

Brancepeth
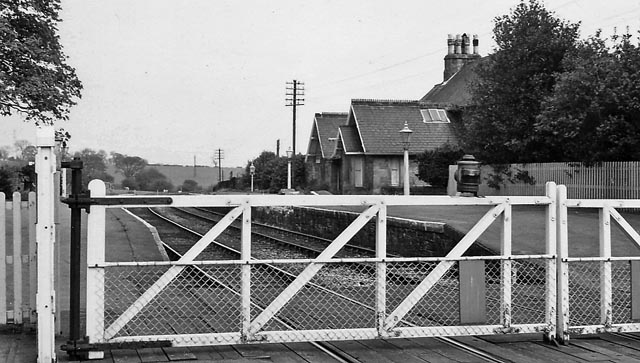
- The level crossing to the south of the station

General information
- Location: Brancepeth, County Durham; England
- Coordinates: 54.7383°N 1.661°W
- Grid reference: NZ219381
- Platforms: 2

Other information
- Status: Disused

History
- Original company: North Eastern Railway
- Pre-grouping: North Eastern Railway
- Post-grouping: LNER; British Railways (North Eastern)

Key dates
- 1 April 1857: Opened
- 4 May 1964: Closed to passengers
- 10 August 1964: Closed completely
Location

Brancepeth railway station served the village of Brancepeth, County Durham, North East England from 1857 to 1964 on the Durham to Bishop Auckland Line.

== History ==
The station opened on 1 April 1857 by the North Eastern Railway. It was situated on the south side of Wolsingham Road. The station was one of three to first open on the line, the other two being Willington and Hunwick. Brancepeth, Oakenshaw and Brandon Collieries were near the station. The line was occasionally used to divert mainline express traffic when there was engineering works occurring between Darlington and Durham. The station was closed to passengers on 4 May 1964, although it reopened in July 1964 for Miners Gala. The station was closed to goods traffic on 10 August 1964.

Preceding station	Disused railways	Following station
Willington; Line and station closed	North Eastern Railway; Durham to Bishop Auckland Line	Brandon Colliery; Line and station closed
