= Waterhouses railway station =

Waterhouses railways station may refer to

- Waterhouses (County Durham) railway station
- Waterhouses (Staffordshire) railway station
