= Hedleyhope =

Hedleyhope may refer to:

- Hedleyhope (parish), containing East Hedleyhope, village in County Durham, England
- Hedleyhope Fell, nature reserve in County Durham, England
