= Durham Viaduct =

Railway viaduct in Durham, England

Coordinates: 54.777908°N 1.583973°W

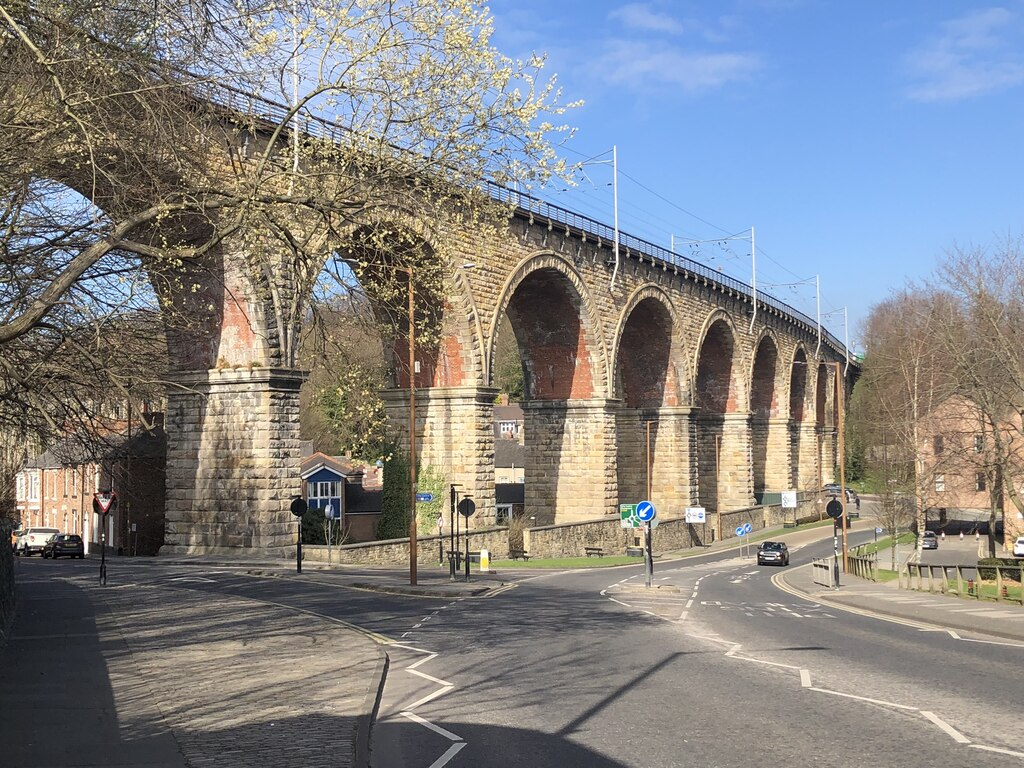
Durham Viaduct

Durham Viaduct is a railway viaduct in the City of Durham in north-eastern England. It carries the East Coast Main Line railway immediately south of Durham railway station.

== History ==
The viaduct was built between 1854 and 1857 for the North Eastern Railway (NER). It was designed by Thomas Elliot Harrison, the NER's chief engineer and built by Richard Cail, a local contractor who was responsible for multiple works in the north-east. The viaduct was originally part of a branch line, the Durham to Bishop Auckland Line, but the main line was diverted over it when two new lines were opened—to Gateshead to the north, in 1868, and from Durham to Tursdale Junction and Darlington to the south in 1872. The route is now part of the East Coast Main Line.

The viaduct is a Grade II* listed building, first designated on 19 February 1970. This status grants it legal protection. Overhead masts were added in the late 20th century when the East Coast Main Line was electrified. Specially designed slender masts were used for the historic bridges on the route.

== Design ==
The viaduct is 277 yards (253 metres) long and and 76 feet (23 metres) tall. It carries the railway over Durham city centre. It consists of eleven arches, supported on tapering piers. It is built from sandstone with ashlar dressings, and brick soffits in a design similar to the Royal Border Bridge further north on the same line. It has coped plinths at the top of the piers from which the arches spring and a continuous drip course in rock-faced stone. As-built, the viaduct had a stone-arched parapet but this was later replaced with iron except over the end piers. Attached to a pier west of North Road is a Gothic-style drinking fountain (now disused) which had formerly been attached to one of the piers supporting the arch over North Road but which was relocated following the street clearance which was required when the adjacent roundabout was built in the early 1970s. .

The elevated position offers views of Durham Castle and Durham Cathedral, especially when travelling north as the railway emerges from a high-sided cutting. According to the railway historian Gordon Biddle, the viaduct "is now as much a part of the dramatic townscape as the castle and the cathedral".
