= Brandon Colliery railway station =

Railway station in County Durham, England

Brandon Colliery
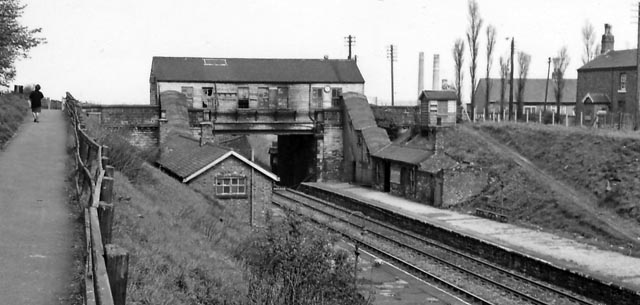
- The closed station in 1965

General information
- Location: Brandon, County Durham; England
- Coordinates: 54.7504°N 1.6284°W
- Grid reference: NZ240395
- Platforms: 2

Other information
- Status: Disused

History
- Original company: North Eastern Railway
- Pre-grouping: North Eastern Railway
- Post-grouping: LNER; British Rail (North Eastern)

Key dates
- July 1861: Opened as Brandon Siding
- 1 March 1878: Name changed to Brandon Colliery
- 4 May 1964: Closed to passengers
- 10 August 1964: Closed completely
Location

Brandon Colliery railway station served the village of Brandon, County Durham, England from 1861 to 1964 on the Durham to Bishop Auckland Line.

== History ==
The station opened as Brandon Siding in July 1861 by the North Eastern Railway. It was situated on the west side of Station Road. The station's name was changed to Brandon Colliery after a full service was introduced on 1 March 1878. The station gets its name from the nearby Brandon Colliery which closed in 1968. The station itself closed to passengers on 4 May 1964 and to goods traffic on 10 August 1964.

Preceding station	Disused railways	Following station
Durham; Line closed, station open	North Eastern Railway; Durham to Bishop Auckland Line	Brancepeth; Line and station closed
