= Brandon and Byshottles =

Civil parish in County Durham, England

Coordinates: 54°45′51″N 1°39′08″W

Brandon and Byshottles is a civil parish and electoral ward in County Durham, England. According to the 2001 census it had a population of 17,774 increasing to 18,509 at the 2011 Census. The parish includes Brandon, New Brancepeth, Broompark, Langley Moor, Ushaw Moor, Meadowfield, Waterhouses and Esh Winning.

Unusually, the parish shares jurisdiction over a quarry south of Esh Winning, with the neighbouring parish of Brancepeth.

For electoral purposes the parish is divided into wards;

- Central Ward (includes Brandon) - elects four parish councillors
- East Ward (includes Langley Moor) - elects three parish councillors
- North Ward (includes New Brancepeth) - elects three parish councillors
- South Ward (includes Meadowfield and Browney) - elects three parish councillors
- Ushaw Moor Ward (includes Ushaw Moor and Broompark) - elects four parish councillors
- West Ward (includes Esh Winning and Waterhouses) - elects four parish councillors

Currently, a majority of the Councillors were elected as Labour Party candidates.

Brandon & Byshottles was established as a local government unit when it was also established as a Local Board District in 1882. Brandon & Byshottles was reconstituted as an Urban District through the Local Government Act 1894.

The Brandon & Byshottles Urban District Council was abolished in 1974 when the area became part of the (now abolished) City of Durham local government area. The Brandon & Byshottles Parish is co-terminous with the pre-1974 UDC area.
