= Langley Moor =

Village in England

Coordinates: 54.758333°N 1.609722°W

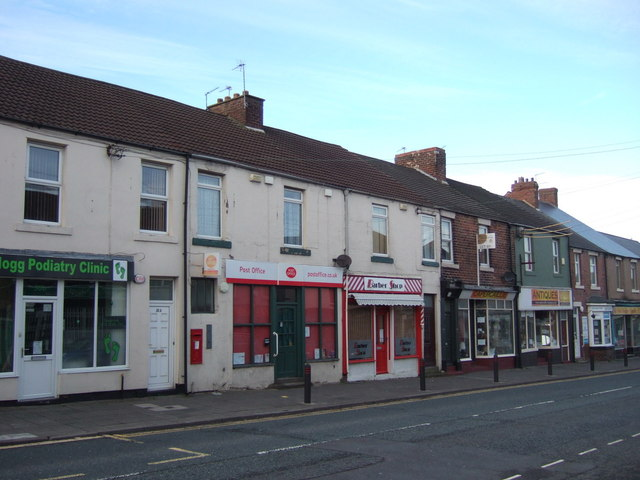

- Location within County Durham
- Population: 1,675 (2011 census)
- OS grid reference: NZ2521840458
- Civil parish: Brandon and Byshottles
- Unitary authority: County Durham
- Ceremonial county: County Durham
- Region: North East
- Country: England
- Sovereign state: United Kingdom
- Post town: DURHAM
- Postcode district: DH7
- Dialling code: 0191
- Police: Durham
- Fire: County Durham and Darlington
- Ambulance: North East
- UK Parliament: City of Durham

Langley Moor is an old pit village in County Durham, England. It is located approximately 2 miles south-west of Durham City. Langley Moor is within the civil parish of Brandon and Byshottles which is itself within the City of Durham constituency, as of 2019 represented by Mary Foy MP.

== History ==
The village consists of a large park, two pubs, three schools, a church and an industrial estate.

Holliday Park (previously Bents Park, known locally as Boyne Park after Lord Boyne) is located to the north of the village, and was renovated in 2016 with a new children's play area. The park also provides access to the River Browney which runs through it. The park was donated to the public by local alderman and philanthropist Martin Forster Holliday (1848-1935), who was the manager and agent for three North Brancepeth Coal Company collieries (Broompark, Boyne and Littleburn - the latter two being in the village) from 1884 until 1922.

There are two pubs in the village, they are The Station, and The Lord Boyne Hotel. Historically, the village had three additional pubs, two inns, the Littleburn Hotel, two cinemas, a working men's club (now residential flats), a post office, a bank and Salvation Army barracks. The New Cross (formerly known as The Langley Moor Hotel) became a charity shop in 2025.

The East Coast Main Line, one of Britain's arterial rail links, runs directly through the village over the high street.

Langley Moor is also home to three supermarkets, a Tesco Metro (formerly Safeway, Somerfield), Lidl, and Aldi.

== Geography ==
The village is located on the A690 approximately 2 miles south-west of Durham and approximately 15 miles south of Newcastle-upon-Tyne.

The Brandon - Bishop Auckland Railway Path is a rail trail stretching nine-miles of scenic woodland which follows the route of the former Durham to Bishop Auckland Line and runs through Langley Moor.

== Education ==
There are three schools in Langley Moor, two primary schools and one nursery school:

- Langley Moor Nursery School
- Langley Moor Primary School (formerly North Brancepeth Council Mixed, Langley Moor Junior Mixed and Infants' School)
- St. Patrick's R.C. Primary School

== Religion ==
The church, St. Patrick's Roman Catholic Church, is located on the border with Meadowfield, which opened on 8 October 1911. The estimated cost of the church was £3,000 (which equals £376,523.30 as of May 2022).

Historically, Langley Moor had a methodist church, a Wesleyan church, a baptist church and a United Methodist church.

== Industry ==
Littleburn Industrial Estate is home to Harrison & Harrison organ builders, who have been involved with organs in cathedrals and churches across the globe.

=== Coal mining ===
==== Boyne Colliery ====
Boyne Colliery opened in approximately 1864 under the ownership of W. Mickle and James Snowball, coal was struck the following year. It was sold to the North Brancepeth Coal Company in the 1880s, under the management of John L. Morland from 1880 until 1884. That same year Martin F. Holliday became agent and manager of the colliery until it closed at some point after 1890.

==== Littleburn Colliery (also known as North Brancepeth Colliery) ====
Littleburn Colliery opened in approximately 1840, it had a handful of owners including North Brancepeth Coal Company, who bought the colliery in the 1880s. In 1925, at its peak, the pit employed 779 people. The colliery mined coal throughout its operational life. Martin F. Holliday became agent of the colliery in 1909 until his retirement in 1922. Littleburn Colliery closed in December 1950.
