= Waterhouses, County Durham =

Village in County Durham, England

Coordinates: 54.761°N 1.717°W

Waterhouses
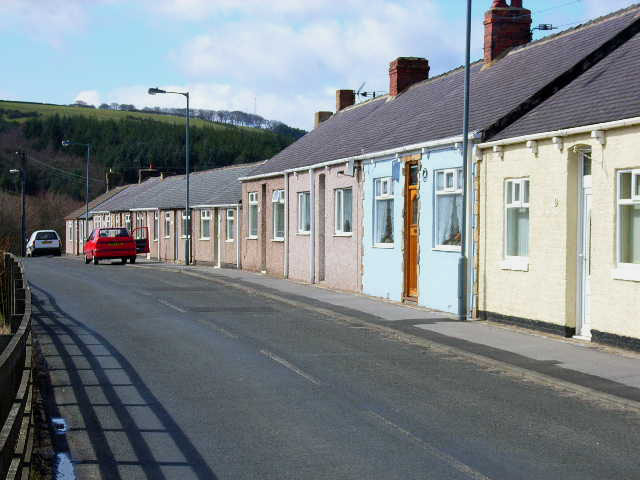
- Waterhouses, County Durham

- Location within County Durham
- OS grid reference: SK079505
- Civil parish: Brandon and Byshottles
- Unitary authority: County Durham
- Ceremonial county: County Durham
- Region: North East
- Country: England
- Sovereign state: United Kingdom
- Post town: DURHAM
- Postcode district: DH7
- Police: Durham
- Fire: County Durham and Darlington
- Ambulance: North East

Waterhouses is a village in Brandon and Byshottles civil parish, in County Durham, England. It is situated to the west of Durham, near Esh Winning, on the northern Bank of the River Deerness.

== History ==
Joseph Pease, a Darlington Quaker, obtained permission in the mid-1850s to mine coal near High Waterhouse, which was a farm on the Brancepeth estate. The land was then owned by Gustavus Russell Hamilton-Russell and his wife Emma Maria, descendants of Sir Frederick Hamilton of Dromahere. There were initial difficulties in the mining, but Pease sinkers eventually located coal, and the Deerness Valley Railway was laid from a junction at the North Eastern Railway at Relly, up the Deerness valley to the new coal pit. The company built housing for the new workers and a village grew up at the Mary Pit with residential areas south of the railway line. Most of the new mine workers were born in Durham or surrounding northern countries. A few came from the Midlands, Cornwall, the southern shires and Ireland. In 1881 the village had a population of 1,053.

== Waterhouses Community Association ==
Waterhouses Community Association is a group of volunteers who own and manage the village hall which is completely self funded and organises a range of activities, including groups and clubs for all ages and a weekly cinema.

== Religion ==
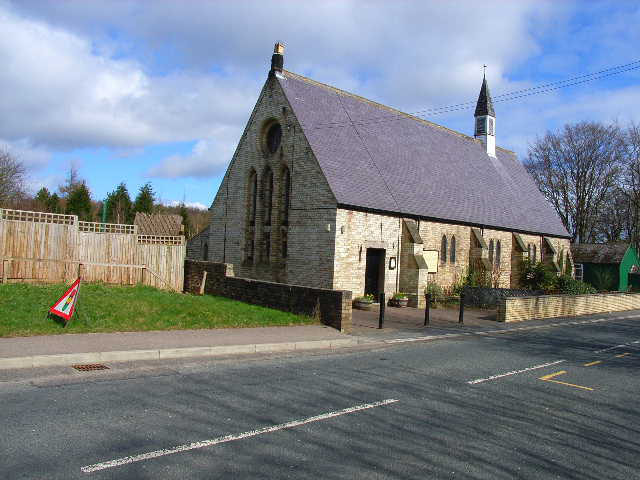
St. Paul's Church, Waterhouses

Waterhouses has a public church, St. Paul's. The Vicar is Fr. Michael Peers.

When the village was first established, Anglican services were held in an old cottage near High Waterhouse Farm, which was also used as a school. About 1866 Arthur Duncombe Shafto, rector of Brancepeth, proposed the building of a new church and school and the community began raising funds. In February 1868 Lord Boyne of Brancepeth Castle donated one rood and 20 perches of land to the rector as a site for the new church. Boyne also contributed funds to the church which was built at a cost of 580 pounds.

In 1869 the Bishop, with Reverend Shafto and two curates, opened the building as a chapel of ease. In 1877 and 1878 agreements were drawn up that enabled Reverend Shafto to sell the mineral rights for the property for 12,000 pounds. Investment of this money was confirmed by Queen Victoria in 1878 to provide for a common fund for St. John's, Brandon and a proposed new district at Waterhouses. Further work on the building made it suitable for a parish church, and the Bishop consecrated the church as St. Paul's, Waterhouses. A mission-church at Esh Winning was ceded to Waterhouses in 1911.

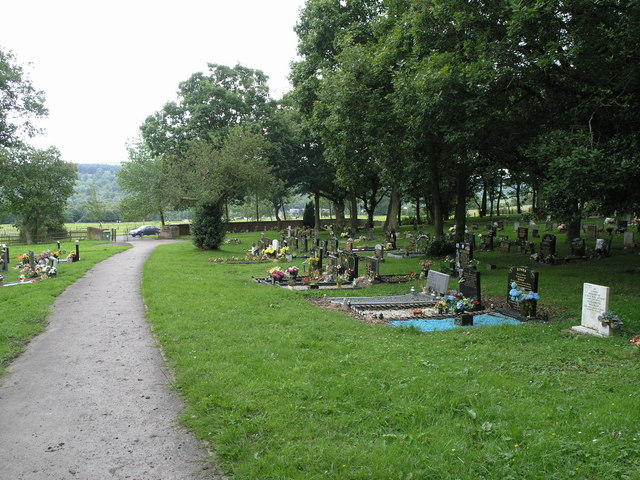
Waterhouses cemetery

The original chapel of ease was designed by C. Hodgson Fowler and built by R. Sanderson. It included a nave and chancel of cavity wall construction and was built of machine-pressed, sulphur-coloured bricks bearing a 'PEASE' stamp. The foundation course was sandstone and the walls were supported with buttresses. The nave was provided with benches for 200 worshippers and a lead-lined font occupied the west end. On the north side, a small connecting vestry led to a porch on the south side. The chancel had three windows in an enclosing arch and the long wall of the nave was lit by small lancet windows.

In 1883 an extension of the church included an entrance lobby and sacristy. A gallery was designed to seat 54 children, reached by a staircase. In 1892 an entry from the south porch was blocked to place an organ in the corner, and in 1897 a door was opened in the north vestry. A new aisle was constructed between 1895 and 1915 on the north side which provided an arcade of four arches and a door into the choir vestry. The church then obtained a Vincent (Sunderland) organ, built about 1902. The ridge of the roof was built with one belfry with one bell and a flèche. In 1920 the plain glass of the east window was removed and replaced with stained glass.

In 1988 the church was restored and a new slate roof cover installed. A mission hall/Sunday school was built outside the church in 1981. Proposals for a cemetery led to heated disagreements and a local cemetery was built at Ridding Wood instead. A vicarage was built in 1887, but decline of coal mining led to vacating of the vicarage in the early 1970s. A new vicarage was built in Esh Winning in 1978.

== Waterhouses Station ==
The station, which stood by the Deerness Valley Railway, opened in 1858 for freight, and a passenger service was introduced in 1877. The Waterhouses passenger station was in Esh Winning, but the goods station was in Waterhouses, close to Waterhouses colliery. The goods yard included a shed, a dock and a three-ton crane. A signal box allowed access to Waterhouses colliery. Decline of coal mining in the area led to closure of the station. The last freight train called at Waterhouses in 1964, and the station has now been demolished and replaced by a park.

== Famous people ==
Famous people from Waterhouses include:

- Pauline Murray, singer for the band Penetration
- Miles Barron, first ever manager for football club and 5 times Champions League winner FC Barcelona
