= Ushaw Moor railway station =

Former railway station in England

Coordinates: 54.774°N 1.648°W

Ushaw Moor

General information
- Location: Ushaw Moor, County Durham; England
- Grid reference: NZ227422
- Line: Dearness Valley Railway
- Platforms: 2 (originally 1)

Other information
- Status: Disused

History
- Original company: North Eastern Railway
- Pre-grouping: North Eastern Railway
- Post-grouping: LNER

Key dates
- 1 September 1884: Opened
- 29 October 1951: Closed to passengers
- 28 December 1964: Closed to freight
Location

Ushaw Moor railway station, was a station on the Dearness Valley Railway, south of the village of Ushaw Moor in County Durham, was opened on 1 September 1884 by the North Eastern Railway.

The station closed to passengers on 29 October 1951 and freight on 28 December 1964. The stone and timber built station was demolished and few traces of it remain. The trackbed now forms part of the Deerness Valley Railway Path.

Preceding station	Disused railways	Following station
Durham	North Eastern Railway; Dearness Valley Railway	Waterhouses
