= New Brancepeth =

Village in County Durham, England

Coordinates: 54°46′N 1°39′W

New Brancepeth is a village in County Durham, in England. It is about 3 miles (5 km) west of the centre of Durham, above the River Deerness. Its population is around 950.

It is about 2.5 miles (4 km) north of Brancepeth village. It was the pit village for New Brancepeth Colliery.

Map showing New Brancepeth and the surrounding area

== Notable places ==
- New Brancepeth Primary School
- New Brancepeth Park
- New Brancepeth Methodist Church
