= Willington railway station (Durham) =

Disused railway station in Willington, England

Willington

General information
- Location: Willington, County Durham; England
- Coordinates: 54.7109°N 1.6934°W
- Grid reference: NZ198352
- Platforms: 2

Other information
- Status: Disused

History
- Original company: North Eastern Railway
- Pre-grouping: North Eastern Railway
- Post-grouping: London and North Eastern Railway; British Railways (North Eastern)

Key dates
- 1 April 1857: Opened
- 4 May 1964: Closed to passengers
- 10 August 1964: Closed completely
Location

Willington railway station served the town of Willington, County Durham, North East England from 1857 to 1964 on the Durham to Bishop Auckland Line.

== History ==
The station opened on 1 April 1857 by the North Eastern Railway. It was situated on the south side of Commercial Road. Along with Hunwick and Brancepeth, this was one of the first stations to open on the line. Nearby were the Willington and Sunnybrow Collieries. The station was closed to passengers on 4 May 1964, although it reopened for Miners Gala in July 1964. The station was closed to goods traffic on 10 August 1964.

Preceding station	Disused railways	Following station
Hunwick; Line and station closed	North Eastern Railway; Durham to Bishop Auckland Line	Brancepeth; Line and station closed
