= Esh, County Durham =

Village in County Durham, England

Coordinates: 54.790537°N 1.706048°W

Esh
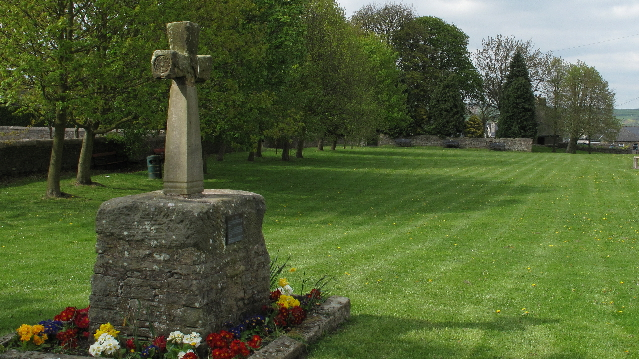
- Esh Cross and village green

- Location within County Durham
- Population: 4,984 (2011 census)
- OS grid reference: NZ 1944
- Civil parish: Esh
- Unitary authority: County Durham
- Ceremonial county: County Durham
- Region: North East
- Country: England
- Sovereign state: United Kingdom
- Post town: DURHAM
- Postcode district: DH7
- Dialling code: 0191
- Police: Durham
- Fire: County Durham and Darlington
- Ambulance: North East
- UK Parliament: North West Durham

Esh is a village and civil parish situated around five miles north-west of Durham in County Durham, England. The central area of the village contains a stone cross, which probably replaced a former market cross. This is locally known as St Cuthberts Cross and bears the inscription I. H. S., and the date 1687. Esh is a rural village, nestled between a number of working farms; it has two primary schools, a pub and two churches, St Michael and All Angels (C of E) and St. Michael's (Roman Catholic).

== Esh parish ==
Esh parish comprises a number of small settlements located near and around Esh village, which include: Ushaw Moor, Esh Winning and Langley Park. Predominantly these are old colliery villages sited on top of the Durham Coalfield, which was exploited in the area from the late 1800s, leading to a need to house workers from newly sunk collieries. The population effect of the coal industry is clearly reflected in a table of population growth through the 1800s, which shows a nine-fold increase in a twenty-year period.

Year	Population
1801	276
1811	383
1821	470
1831	486
1841	518
1851	642
1861	942
1871	2294
1881	6333
1891	6392

== History ==
The tiny village of Esh (which should not be confused with Esh Winning in the Deerness Valley to the south) is situated to the south west of Langley Park on a hill between the valleys of the Browney and Deerness. Sometimes known as Old Esh, its Anglo-Saxon name means 'Ash' as in the tree but 'esh' reflects the traditional Northumbrian dialect historically spoken throughout the North.

Esh later gave its name to a family of medieval times called De Esh who resided here up until the reign of Henry VIII. They included Simon De Esh, a High Sheriff and Bailiff of Durham in the 1300s. Esh village, which dates from 1283, may be on the site of their private family chapel. The walled village green south of the church includes a prominent stone cross inscribed with the letters ‘I.H.S’ and dating to 1687. Nearby, a farmhouse called Esh Hall was built by the Smythe family in the 1600s.

The Smythes who originated from Nunstainton near Sedgefield succeeded the De Esh family and were fiercely Roman Catholic even during the later Tudor era when Catholics were persecuted. They established an illegal place of worship, at nearby Newhouse (near Esh Winning) and this continued in use until 1798. A Catholic church was later built on the site serving Irish Catholics in the newly established colliery village of Esh Winning. Sir Edward Smythe of Esh Hall replaced the Newhouse with a new place of worship which opened in 1800 at a place to the west of Esh village that came to be called Esh Laude. Perhaps wary of past persecution and the tradition of disguising Catholic places of worship, Esh Laude was built to resemble a farmhouse. It is the oldest church in the Roman Catholic Diocese of Hexham and Newcastle that serves the North-East.

== Governance ==
An electoral ward in the same name exists. This ward stretches west to Cornsay and other areas. The total population of the ward taken at the 2011 Census was 6,570.

== Church ==
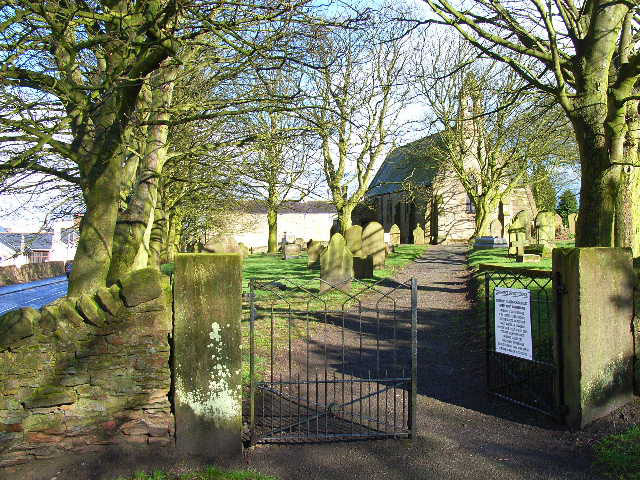
St Michael and All Angels Church, Esh, County Durham

There has been a church on the site of St. Michael and All Angels since at least 1283. Much of the church was rebuilt in the 1770s and restored in the 1850s. King Edward I attended Mass here on 10 September 1306, while on his way from Durham to Hexham and left an offering of seven shillings. There is a medieval effigy of a costumed lady in the church that is thought to be one of the De Eshes

Christian legend proclaims that monks stopped and rested in the village whilst carrying St Cuthbert's body on the way to Durham and gives reasoning for the name of the village cross. Another iconic person linked to St. Michael and All Angels from 1835 until his death was the British astronomer Temple Chevallier, who served as C of E Parson at Esh, and restored the church whilst also lecturing at Durham University.

== Education ==
Two primary schools preside in Esh, both with links to Christian Churches.

St Michael's Esh Laude RC Primary School

Originally a Catholic Convent, thought to have been established in 1795 therefore making it the oldest Roman Catholic primary school in the area. However, the convent closed in the summer of 2010 due to Sister Anna Ryan leaving; ending a 121-year tradition of having a nun heading the school.

Subsequently, a former pupil, Helen McDaid is to become Head of the school and the school continues having achieved an outstanding Ofsted report in 2010.

Esh Church of England Aided Primary School

The school was founded about 1836 by Temple Chevallier, on land which had previously been part of nearby Glebe Farm. Mr Andy Parks is the Head and although not a former convent, this Church of England primary school also assists teachings with Christianity. This is reinforced by a report made by the Statutory Inspection of Anglican Schools; the school holds the motto 'Everyone Smiles Here' and a SIAS inspection found this to be a trend setter in the way pupils behave towards each other and is stated to be highly commendable.

== Demography ==
Esh ward in 2021 had 2093 homes and a population of 5023. The data in the table below shows how a large minority of residents in the area were between 30 and 59. The two schools in the area are both highly rated.

Age	Number	Percentage
Under 16	998	19.9%
16 to 19	231	4.6%
20 to 29	563	11.2%
30 to 59	2202	43.8%
60 to 74	637	12.7%
75 and over	392	7.8%
Total	5023	100

== Esh Parish Walk ==
Starting from Langley Park, accessible from the A691 Durham to Consett road. Around seven miles long the walk will take approximately three hours to complete and is reasonably unchallenging except for a steep climb towards the beginning. The full route may be found on the Esh Parish website posted in the extended links below. Whilst ordnance survey maps covering the area include the Landranger scale 1 :50,000 No.88 and the Pathfinder maps scale 1 :25,000 No's 571 Lanchester and 572 Durham.

== The Cross Keys ==
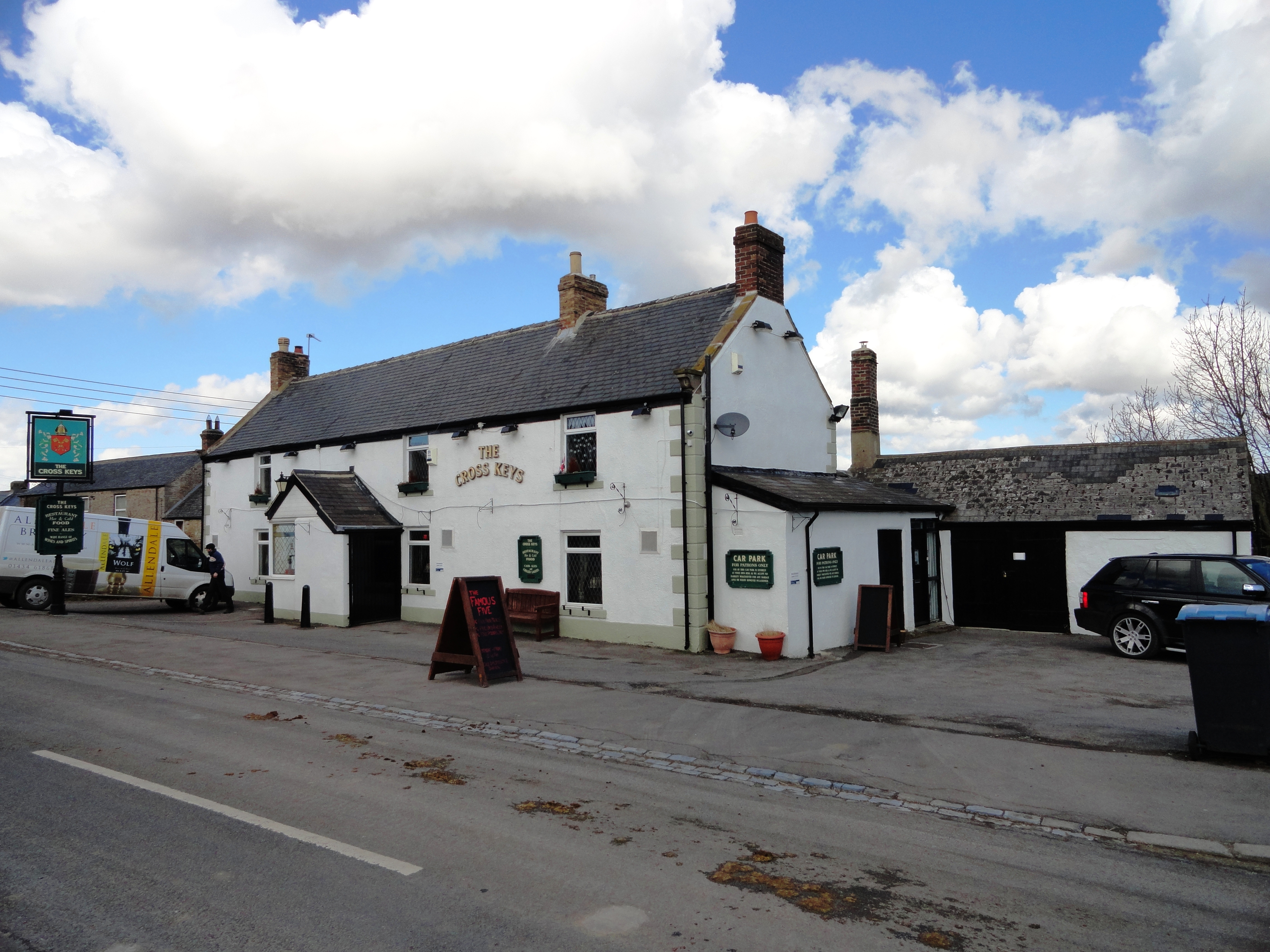
The Cross Keys

Esh's only pub, has been in the village since the fourteenth century and is thought to have been visited by Edward I. The Good Pub Guide states that The Cross keys is a pleasant pub in a "picturesque village, with beautiful views across the valley and a full menu".
