= Waterhouses railway station (Durham) =

Former railway station in England

Coordinates: 54.7688°N 1.7033°W

Waterhouses
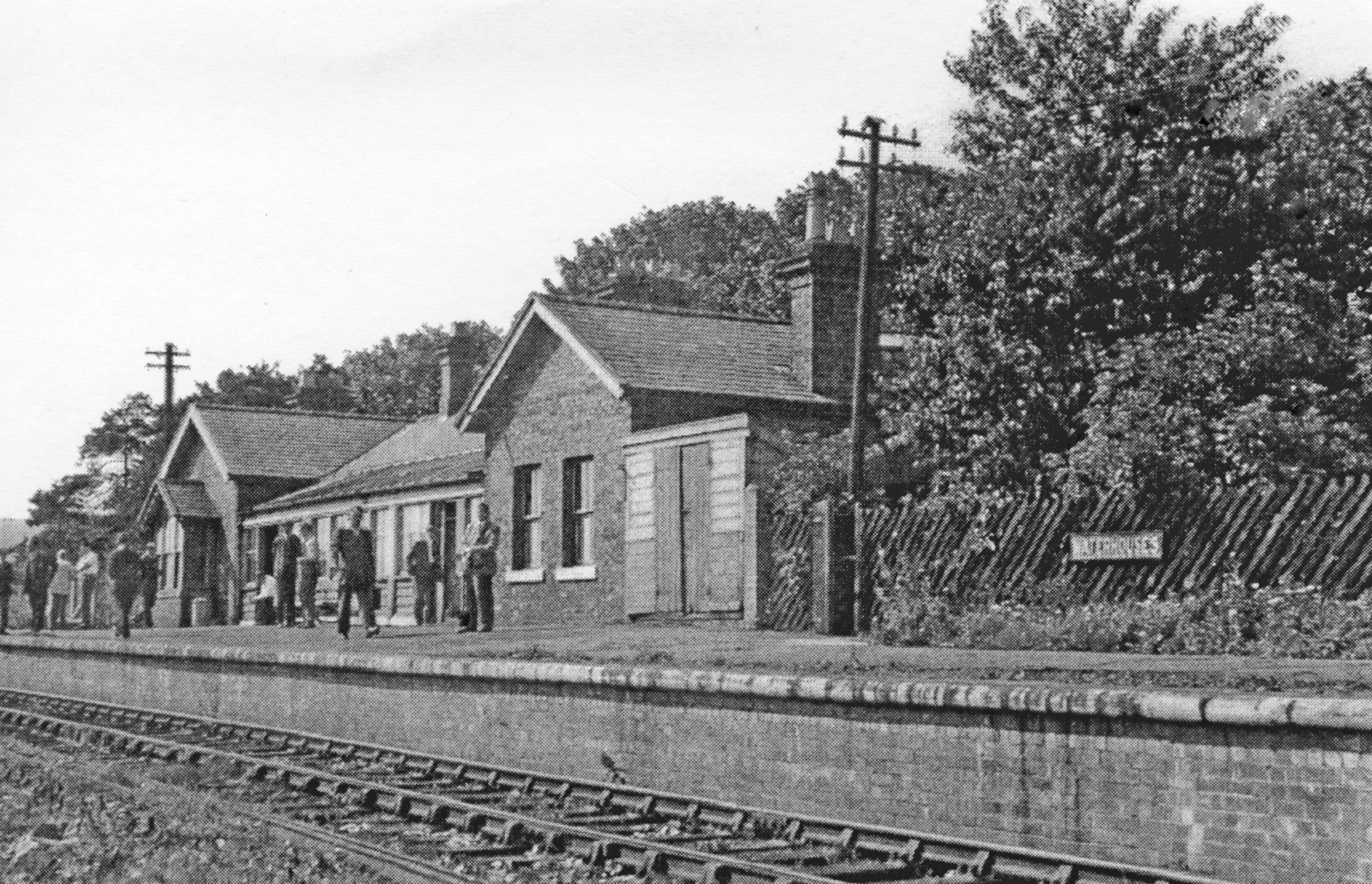
- Waterhouses station, 1958

General information
- Location: Esh Winning, County Durham; England
- Grid reference: NZ192416
- Platforms: 1

Other information
- Status: Disused

History
- Original company: North Eastern Railway
- Pre-grouping: North Eastern Railway
- Post-grouping: LNER

Key dates
- 1 November 1877: Opened
- 29 October 1951: Closed to passengers
- 28 December 1964: Closed to freight
Location

Waterhouses railway station, on the Dearness Valley Railway, south of the village of Esh Winning in County Durham, England, was opened on 1 November 1877 by the North Eastern Railway. The station served as the passenger terminus of the line, although goods wagons continued to East Hedley Hope and Waterhouses collieries.

In 1914 Connie Lewcock, who led the local suffragettes, assisted by miner Joss Craddock, burnt down the railway building at Esh Winning. She describes how she planned the event in an interview with the historian, Brian Harrison, recorded in 1976 as part of his Suffrage Interviews project, titled Oral evidence on the suffragette and suffragist movements: the Brian Harrison interviews. Lewcock had designed a system that gave her an alibi for the time the building was alight. The building burnt down but the Police could not make formal charges as she had witnesses who could testify that she was with them at the time of the fire. Lewcock became a popular politician and she was appointed an OBE in the New Years Honours List in 1966.

The station closed to passengers on 29 October 1951, and freight on 28 December 1964.

The stone and timber built station was demolished and the site is now a park. The trackbed now forms part of the Deerness Valley Railway Path.

Preceding station	Disused railways	Following station
Ushaw Moor; Line and station closed	North Eastern Railway; Dearness Valley Railway	Terminus
