= Cornsay Colliery =

Village in County Durham, England

Coordinates: 54°47′6″N 1°44′9″W

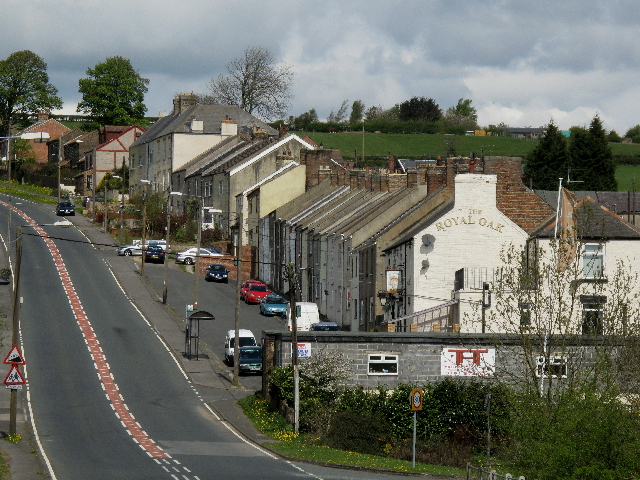
Cornsay Colliery

Cornsay Colliery is a village in County Durham, England. It is situated a few miles to the west of Durham, close to Cornsay, Quebec and Esh Winning.

== History ==
Regarding Cornsay Colliery, the following is taken from History, Topography, and Directory of the County Palatine of Durham published by Francis Whellan & Company in 1894:

The Cornsay Colliery, worked by Messrs. Ferens and Love, was first opened out in 1868, and is situated within the township of Cornsay, but in this parish. There are four seams, the whole of which are worked by drifts into the hillsides. The 'Harvey' is 2 feet 8 inches thick; the 'Ballarat' 1 foot 9 inches; the 'Five Quarter' 2 feet 2 inches to 3 feet 6 inches, and the Main coal is 3 feet. The names of the drifts are Low Drift, High Drift, Colpike Drift, and Ford Drift, which give a daily output amounting to 750 tons, about the half of which is converted into coke on the spot, there being 270 ovens. A great feature of this pit is that it yields a splendid fire-clay, which supplies the rather extensive brick, tile, and sanitary pipe-works in connection with the colliery. It is contemplated by the owners to lay down plant for the manufacture of glazed, sanitary, and other ware, for which the clay is so well adapted. This colliery in its various departments gives employment to an average of 700 men and boys. The royalties worked, besides a large area of freehold owned by themselves, are leased from Ushaw College, the Ecclesiastical Commissioners, and Miss Taylor-Smith. Hamsteels Collieries and Coke Ovens were commenced in 1867 by Messrs. R. S. Johnson and T. M. Reay, and are now carried on under the title of 'The Owners of Hamsteels Collieries.' There are four seams met and worked, 'The Brockwell' having an average thickness of 3 feet 6 inches; the 'Upper Busty' 1 foot 8 inches; the 'Lower Busty' 2 feet 4 inches; and the "Harvey" about 3 feet 8 inches. The latter seam, which was drifted in 1890, is not of equal quality to the others. There are two shafts 35 and 20 fathoms, as well as three drifts, giving a total yearly output of (when fully working) 280,000 tons. Three-fourths of this output is converted into coke on the spot. This colliery gives employment in its various branches to 680 men and boys. At Malton, coal has also been wrought since 1870, the Malton being in that year opened by Mr. G. Love. It is now worked by S. A. Sadler, Esq., of Middlesbrough. The Harvey, Brockwell, and Busty seams are met here, and worked by drifts, the thickness of the seams ranging from two to four feet. Patent ovens and other important improvements are rapidly developing, and ere long this colliery will employ a large number of men.

Cornsay Colliery is a populous village situated on a hillside on the north bank of the Dearness, seven miles and a half west of Durham, and two miles west of Esh. It is partly in the township of Esh, and partly in that of Cornsay, the road which runs through the village being the boundary.

Hamsteels is another colliery village a little to the south of Quebec, and occupied chiefly by the officials of the colliery which, with its coke ovens and shops, lies just below. From the hill above this village, a fine prospect of great extent along the valleys of the Dearness and Browney is obtained.

Quebec, which derives its name from a farmhouse close by, is on the road between Esh and Lanchester, one and a half miles west of the former, and two and a half south by east of the latter. Here dwell most of the employees of the Hamsteels colliery, and here also is the church, the schools, and Wesleyan and Primitive chapels.

Malton is a small colliery village, about a mile and a half from Quebec. Coal has been worked here for some time, but only in a small way up to the present; there is, however, every prospect of this becoming a large and populous colliery village, as preparations are being made to open out what promises to be a large coal royalty.

The Church is a small plain stone building in the Early English style, built in 1875. It was originally built as a school-chapel, but was at the formation of the parish converted into a church. It will seat about 300. The living is a vicarage valued at £300 per year, in the gift of the crown and bishop alternately, and held by the Rev. Francis G. Wesley, M.A. There are about twenty acres of glebe.

The Vicarage, a substantial brick residence, stands a little to the south-west of the church, within two acres of ground, on the Cornsay road, and was built in 1890, at a cost of nearly £2000.

The Wesleyan Methodist Chapel is a neat stone building of Gothic style, erected in 1873 at a cost of £750, to seat 400. The colliery proprietors gave £150 in addition to the site.

The Primitive Chapel, also of stone, was built in 1875, and will accommodate 300. The cost was £600, in addition to site, which with £150 was given by colliery owners.

The Methodist New Connexion have a chapel at Cornsay Colliery, which was originally built for the day school by the colliery owners, but becoming too small, it was given to this body, who fitted it internally to seat 400.

The National School is at Quebec village on the north side of the road, upon the site of the old Roman road. It is a stone building, built about 1875, with mixed and infants' departments, having a total accommodation for 240 children.

St. Charles' Catholic School, at Cornsay Colliery, was built in 1874, and is a brick building with accommodation for about 220. Attached to this school is a house for the master.

The British School, Cornsay Colliery, is a good building of brick, built in 1876 by the colliery proprietors. It is for mixed and infants, with accommodation for 400 in all, and is fully attended.

The Temperance Hall is a building with a seating capacity of about 300, and is well adapted for public entertainments, having a stage and ante-room.
