= Meadowfield =

Village in County Durham, England

Coordinates: 54°45.1′N 1°37.1′W

Meadowfield is a small village in County Durham, England, situated approximately two miles south-west of Durham on the A690. It is situated within the civil parish of Brandon and Byshottles.

The village consists mainly of one road of terraced housing that runs from Langley Moor in the north-east, to Willington and Crook in the south-west. Directly to the north, is the large village of Brandon. This was the site of a pit and also a brick works. The village has a small industrial estate, which was the scene of a relatively large fire in a nappy factory in 1991.

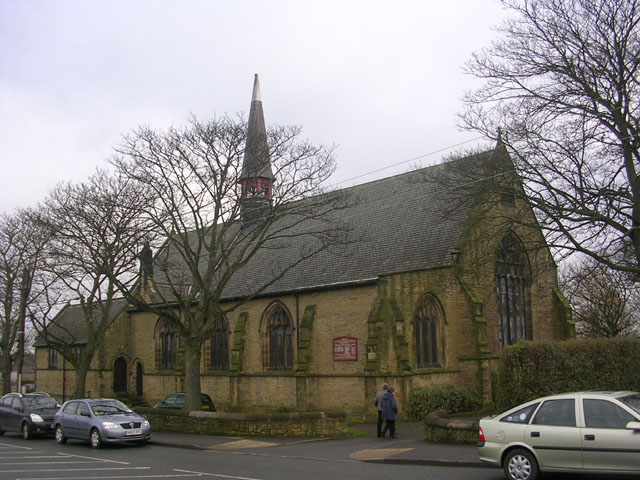
St John the Evangelist Church, Meadowfield

One of the buildings of note in Meadowfield is the Anglican church of St John the Evangelist, one of the larger parish churches in County Durham. There is also a Royal British Legion social club, which occupies a wooden cabin, which was brought over from Canada. The centre of the street houses the large structure of council offices, which once was the village co-op. The building has recently been demolished and the site developed as a housing project.

The village also has a sports centre and adjacent playing field. The field is home to many activities, such as being training pitch to the Durham Tigers rugby league side, and is also home to an annual sporting events and steam rallies. The steam rally consists of various tractors, traction engines, organs and other steam-propelled or operated machines. It occurs at the beginning of the summer, along with a small fair.

From late 2004, building began on part of the sports ground to house the new council and police offices, and a tarmacadammed floodlight sportsground. The summer of 2005 saw the final touches being added to the new council offices.

== Famous residents ==
- Peter Willis, football referee
