= Durham to Bishop Auckland Line =

Railway line in County Durham, England

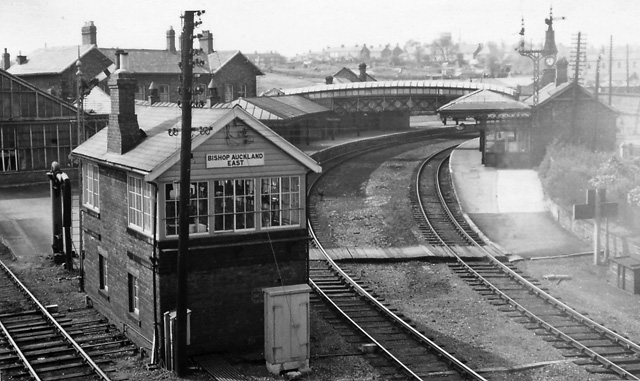
View along the curved platforms of Bishop Auckland in 1965, which served the former NER line to Durham, and Clarence Railway via Byers Green

The Durham to Bishop Auckland Line was a railway line originally built by the North Eastern Railway (NER) to provide rail transport access to coal mines in West County Durham. It closed under the Beeching Axe to passenger traffic in May 1964, and freight in 1968. Today it forms the major part of the 9 miles (14 km) Brandon to Bishop Auckland rail trail.

== Background ==
After the opening of the Stockton and Darlington Railway (S&DR) in 1825 to transport coal from the Witton Park Colliery to Newport on the River Tees, railways had been expanding across County Durham to provide coal mine owners with access to cheap economic transport.

Bishop Auckland gained its first rail link in 1842, when the S&DR backed Bishop Auckland and Weardale Railway (BA&WR) built the railway line authorised by the Bishop Auckland and Weardale Railway Act 1837 (7 Will. 4 & 1 Vict. c. cxxii) from the S&DR's station at Shildon via Bishop Auckland and Witton-le-Wear into Crook, County Durham. After the completion of Shildon Tunnel, the BA&WR erected a permanent station in the town which opened to freight on 8 November 1843, and passengers on 30 January 1843. All operations were sub-leased as agreed to the S&DR.

The opening of Bishop Auckland created a new railway junction, with lines eventually progressing north to Crook and Weardale (accessing limestone reserves along the River Wear valley); and south to Tebay via Barnard Castle. However, there were still coal mines to the east of Bishop Auckland, and the substantial passenger traffic from Durham.

== History ==
Developed by North Eastern Railway (NER), they built a new terminus in Tenter Street, Bishop Auckland. The line to Durham opened to freight on 19 August 1856 and passengers on 1 April 1857. There were intermediate stations at Hunwick, Willington and Brancepeth, while a fourth station serving Brandon Colliery opened in 1861.

However, the S&DR and NER quickly came to the agreement of development of a joint station at Bishop Auckland, and so rebuilt the existing former BA&WR station, with NER trains using it from December 1857.

=== Durham and ECML junction ===
Although there were three existing stations within Durham, the NER choose to develop a new fourth station site on the current location, requiring a viaduct over North Road and a further viaduct over the River Browney immediately to the south. As Durham gained connections to along both the Deerness Valley Railway and the Lanchester Railway, the three lines connected at Deerness Valley Junction. In 1871 the NER developed a new line from Tursdale through Durham, and onwards north to Newcastle Central via Chester-le-Street. This soon became the main line between London and Newcastle, the current East Coast Main Line. The existing lines connected with the new mainline via Rellymill Junction.

=== Closure ===
Hunwick lost its freight service in 1958. Scheduled passenger services between Sunderland, Durham and Bishop Auckland ceased in May 1964, although in July 1964 a Durham Miners' Gala train used the line to pick up passengers. Freight services were ceased from Brancepeth, Willington and Brandon Collieries from 10 August 1964. The line remained in place until 1968, when contractors removed the residual track.

Since closure of all three branchlines, the mainline between Rellymill Junction to Deerness Valley Junction has been incorporated into a realigned East Coast Main Line curve, eased to increase line speed.

== Present ==
After lying derelict for over 25 years, 9 miles (14 km) of the former trackbed has been redeveloped by Durham County Council as the Brandon to Bishop Auckland rail trail.

In January 2019, Campaign for Better Transport released a report identifying the line which was listed as Priority 2 for reopening. Priority 2 is for those lines which require further development or a change in circumstances (such as housing developments).

== Collieries served ==
The line served a number of collieries:

- Hunwick Colliery
- Newfield Colliery and Brickworks
- West Hunwick Colliery
- Rough Lea Colliery
- Willington/Sunnybrow Colliery
- Via the West Durham Railway
  - Brancepeth Colliery
  - Oakenshaw Colliery
  - Brandon Colliery
  - Brandon Pit House Colliery).
