= East Hedleyhope =

Village in County Durham, England

Coordinates: 54.757°N 1.759°W

- Location within County Durham
- OS grid reference: NZ155402
- Unitary authority: County Durham
- Ceremonial county: County Durham
- Region: North East
- Country: England
- Sovereign state: United Kingdom
- Post town: DARLINGTON
- Postcode district: DL13
- Police: Durham
- Fire: County Durham and Darlington
- Ambulance: North East

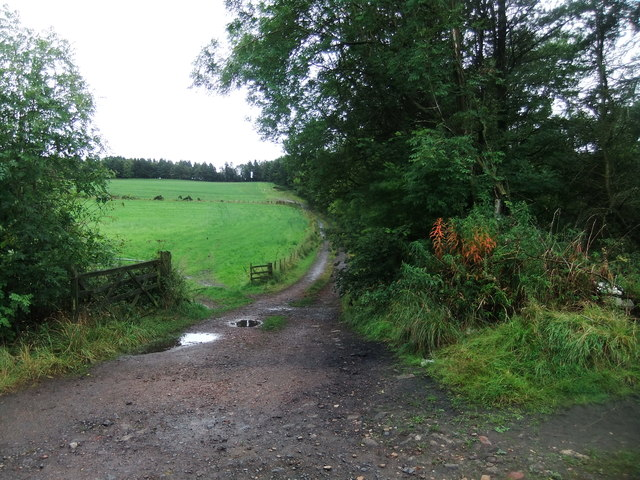
A pathway leading to fields near East Hedleyhope

East Hedleyhope is a village in County Durham, in England. It is situated about 8 miles (13 km) west of Durham, up the Deerness valley. The main village comprises two streets, West View and Deerness View; there are also a few houses on the other side of the football pitch. In total there are approximately forty homes.

== Economy ==
Historically, East Hedleyhope was a mining village and had a larger population. The mine closed in the early years of the twentieth century, but was re-opened for the war efforts and closed completely on 31 January 1959.

== Transport ==
The village is the terminus of the 52 bus service with a frequent service to Durham.

== Public services ==
There is a thriving community with many social events which occur in the modern village hut. The young residents have good facilities such as the playground and the football pitch.
