= Broompark =

Coordinates: 54.7698°N 1.6228°W

- Location within County Durham
- OS grid reference: NZ2426441729
  - London: 261 mi (420 km)
- Civil parish: Brandon and Byshottles
- Unitary authority: County Durham
- Ceremonial county: County Durham
- Region: North East
- Country: England
- Sovereign state: United Kingdom
- Post town: DURHAM
- Postcode district: DH7
- Police: Durham
- Fire: County Durham and Darlington
- Ambulance: North East
- UK Parliament: City of Durham

Broompark is a village in County Durham, England. It is situated some 3 miles (4.8 km) west of Durham city. It was once the site of the Broompark colliery, operated by North Brancepeth Coal company. The oldest remaining buildings in the village are Broom Farm guesthouse, built in 1711, and Broom Farm West, also built in the early 18th century. It was also the site of The Loves pub, which is now closed.
