= Cornsay =

Hamlet and civil parish in County Durham, England

Coordinates: 54°47′N 1°46′W

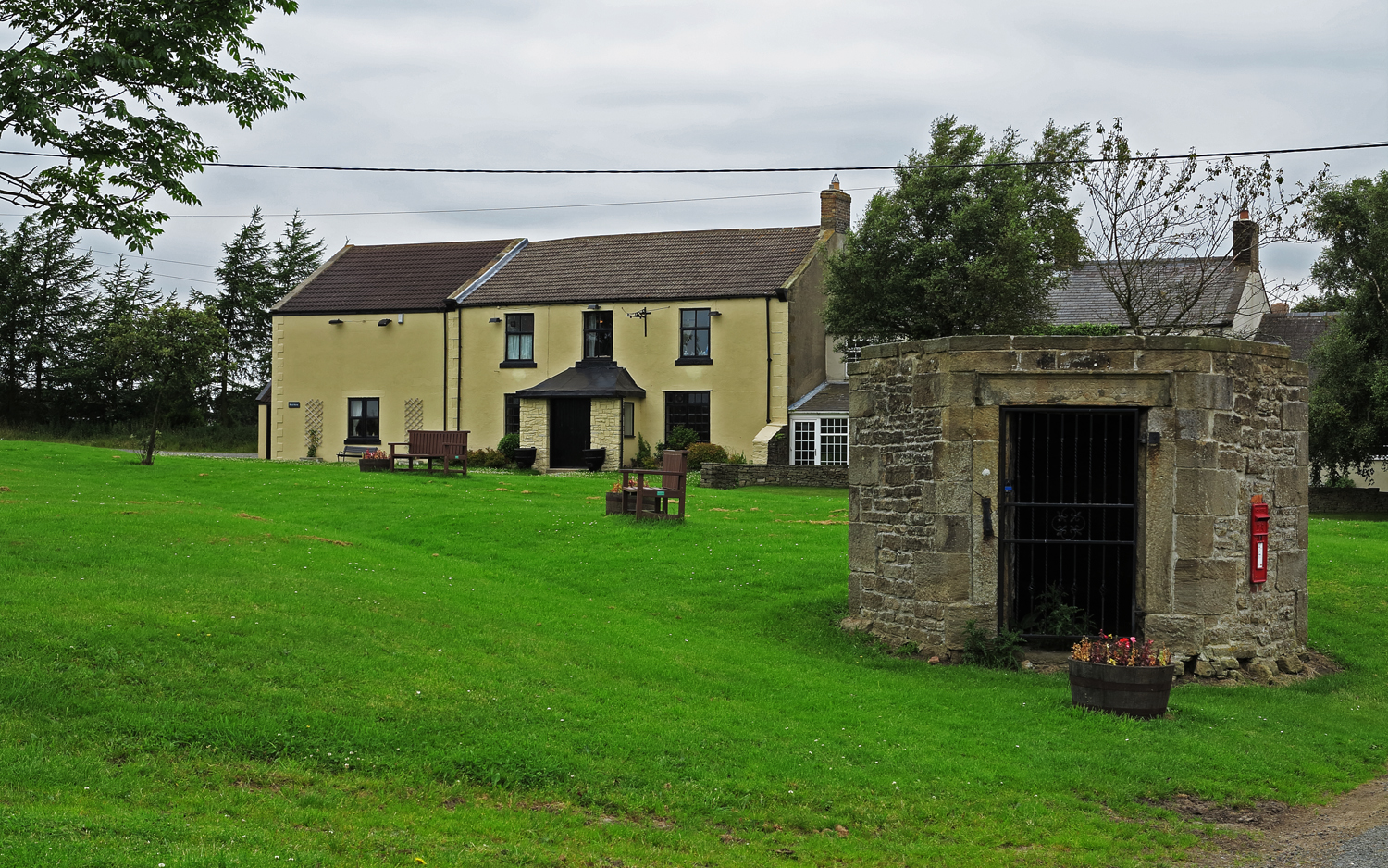
- The draw well at Cornsay

- Location within County Durham
- Population: 1,128 (2011 census)
- Civil parish: Cornsay
- Unitary authority: County Durham
- Ceremonial county: Durham
- Region: North East
- Country: England
- Sovereign state: United Kingdom
- Police: Durham
- Fire: County Durham and Darlington
- Ambulance: North East

Cornsay is a hamlet and civil parish in County Durham, England. The population of the civil parish taken at the 2011 census was 1,128. It is 6 miles (9.7 km) southeast of Consett and 7 miles (11 km) southwest of Durham. It consists of nineteen dwellings, including four farms & is the home of Greenacres nudist club. All formerly belonged to Ushaw College for the training of Catholic priests, hence the organised nomenclature. East and West Farms are now in private hands as homes but the other two are still active, South Farm run by the Suddes family and North Farm by the Tweddle family.

On the village green is the enigmatic ‘draw well’: at first look a bus shelter but on closer inspection a building with a 17th-century dedication. It was once the main source of water for the village and later a site for the sale of paraffin at a time when the village was larger. It was restored in 2007 by the removal of a breeze-block infill blocking the doorway and now has a new wrought-iron gate allowing inspection of the interior of the building.

== See also ==
- Cornsay Colliery
