= Hunwick railway station =

Disused railway station in County Durham, England

Hunwick
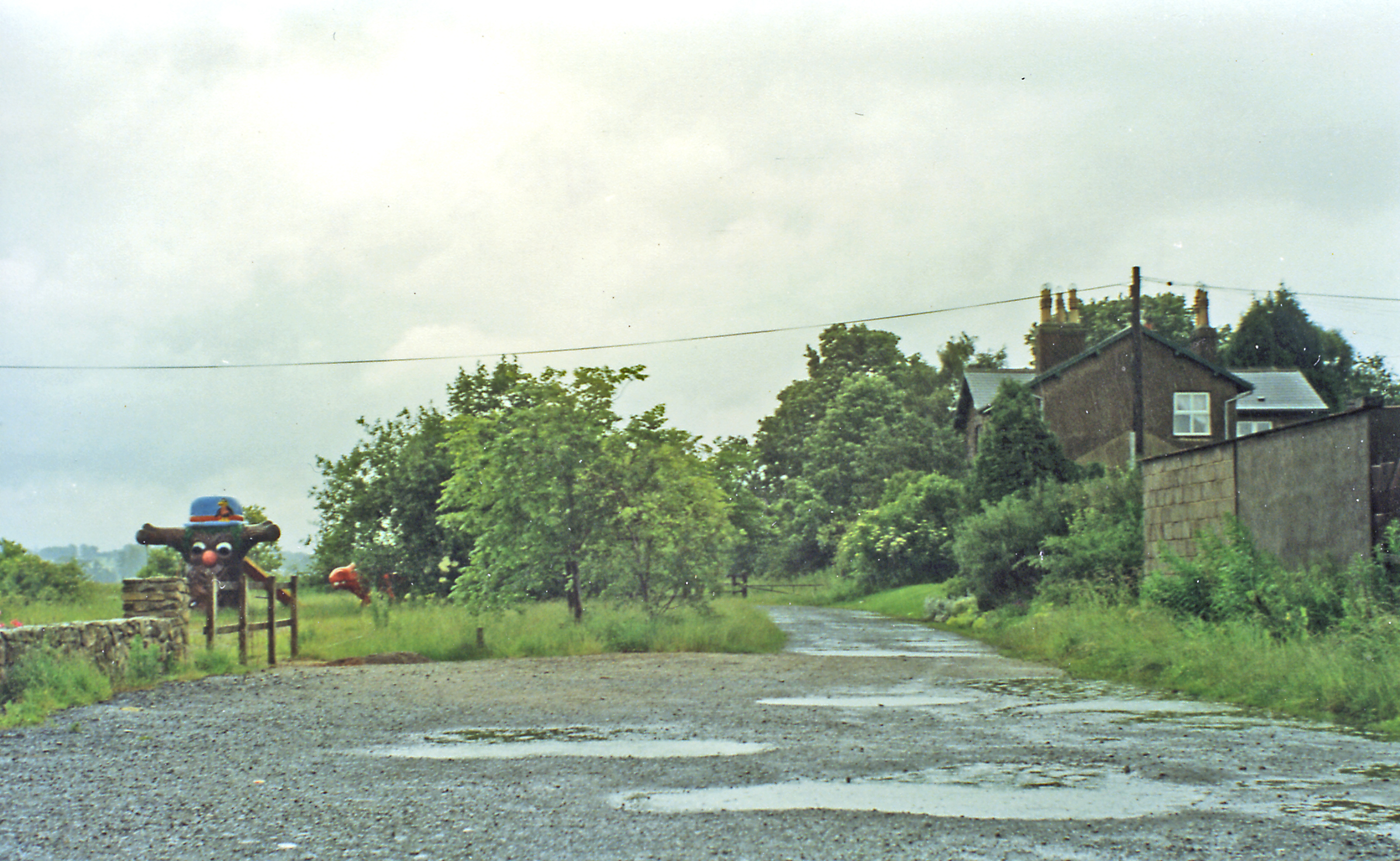
- The site of Hunwick station in June 1997

General information
- Location: Hunwick, County Durham; England
- Coordinates: 54.6884°N 1.6931°W
- Grid reference: NZ198326
- Platforms: 2

Other information
- Status: Disused

History
- Original company: North Eastern Railway
- Pre-grouping: North Eastern Railway
- Post-grouping: LNER British Rail (North Eastern)

Key dates
- 1 April 1857: Opened
- 4 May 1964: Closed
Location

Hunwick railway station served the village of Hunwick, County Durham, England from 1857 to 1964 on the Durham to Bishop Auckland Line.

== History ==
The station opened on 1 April 1857 by the North Eastern Railway. It was situated on the south side of Station Road. The goods yard consisted of a single siding behind the up platform. The goods facilities at the station were basic, handling general goods and parcels but not livestock. On the north side of the level crossing were Hunwick Colliery, Tillery and Brickworks. The goods facilities were withdrawn from the station on 15 September 1958 and it was closed to passengers on 4 May 1964.

Preceding station	Disused railways	Following station
Bishop Auckland; Line closed, station open	North Eastern Railway; Durham to Bishop Auckland Line	Willington; Line and station closed
