= Brandon, County Durham =

Village in County Durham, England

Coordinates: 54.75°N 1.628°W

Brandon
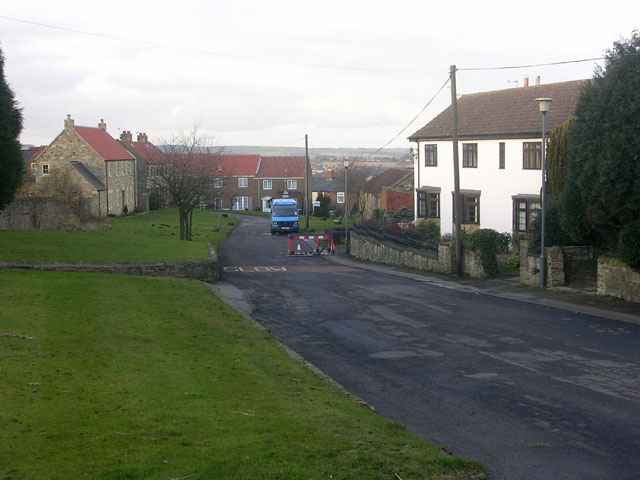
- North End, Brandon

- Location within County Durham
- OS grid reference: NZ240396
- Civil parish: Brandon and Byshottles
- Unitary authority: County Durham
- Ceremonial county: County Durham
- Region: North East
- Country: England
- Sovereign state: United Kingdom
- Post town: DURHAM
- Postcode district: DH7
- Dialling code: 0191
- Police: Durham
- Fire: County Durham and Darlington
- Ambulance: North East
- UK Parliament: City of Durham

Brandon is a village in County Durham, England. It is situated a short distance to the southwest of Durham. Brandon was originally one of the seven townships within the ancient parish of Brancepeth. It grew from a sparsely populated agricultural area into a populous mining district after the establishment of collieries and later coke and fireclay works. Until the 19th century Brandon village, formerly known as East Brandon, was one of the larger settlements in Brancepeth Parish.

== History ==
Brandon was also a manor of the medieval lordship of Brancepeth and as such was possessed by the Neville family, the Earls of Westmoreland, while Holywell, Langley, Littleburn and other such localities were the sites of large freehold gentry houses.

=== The Northern Rising ===
After the Northern Rising of 1569, Elizabeth I confiscated Brancepeth Castle and its territories. These were administered as Crown Lands until the 1620s and plundered by a series of courtiers and Royal lessees. In 1628-29 these lands were conveyed to the City of London when Charles I was forced to redeem his debts to the city. The Brancepeth lands were broken up in a series of sales to London merchants and financiers who in turn resold to local buyers at high profits. The one exception to this fate was Brandon manor, which remained in the hands of its London buyer. A silk merchant, Edward Cropley, bought the whole estate of Brandon manor for £1,700 in 1630, and his family held onto the property till 1710. It was then conveyed to the Earl of Shaftesbury and remained in his family until the 1800s.

=== William Russell ===
In 1796 William Russell, a coal owner, retired from mining the Durham Coalfield and spent part of his fortune on buying and restructuring Brancepeth Castle. He set about repurchasing as much as possible of the old lordship broken up in the sales of the 1630s.

In 1806 he purchased the Brandon estate from the then Earl of Shaftesbury for £105,000. Russell's granddaughter married into the Irish peerage, and the name Hamilton-Russell and title Viscount Boyne became connected with the district.

== Population ==
In 1801 the Brandon and Byshottles population was 522; in 1811, 435; in 1851, 525; by 1881 it had risen to 10,850; and in 1891, it was 14,240. There had been a decline in population during the 1830s owing to the removal of workmen who had been engaged in the rebuilding and enlargement of Brancepeth Castle, with the population falling to 427. The stone for this building work had been quarried in Brandon village, and Sawmills Lane is thought to have been constructed as a more direct route for the carting of stone to Brancepeth.

== Industry ==
=== Agriculture ===
The great majority of the local workforce was engaged in agriculture, when the lessee of Brandon's coal seams was as much a farmer as he was a collier. It is recorded that John Shaw was operating a landsale pit in 1836 using a whim-gin, usually employing horses or a bull, to raise the coal to the surface.

=== Coal mining ===
The area experienced a dramatic change in the 1850s, as the growing iron and manufacturing industries required coal and coke in ever-increasing quantities and entrepreneurs moved into the area to develop coal mines.

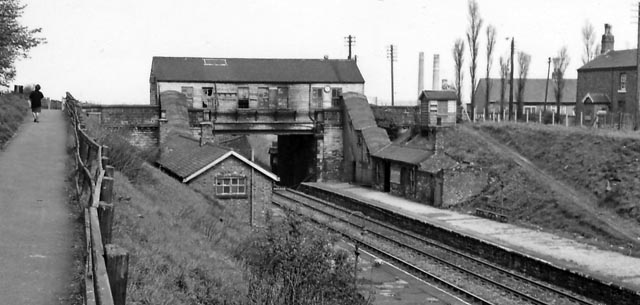
Brandon Colliery railway station in May 1965, the year after it closed.

Brandon colliery

The Newcastle firm of Straker and Love obtained the site that was to become Brandon colliery, sinking the 'A' shaft in 1856 and the 'C' pit in 1860. In 1894, 1150 men and boys were employed working the Hutton, Busty, and Brockwell seams of coal at this colliery. Brandon Pit house was sunk in 1924. Coal mining finally came to an end at Brandon on 15 March 1968.

Browney colliery

Other firms arrived to take leases. Bell Brothers of Newcastle and Middlesbrough commenced sinking at Browney colliery in 1871, with coal being drawn in 1873 from three shafts working the Brockwell, Busty, and Hutton seams. The firm was taken over by Dorman Long & Co. in 1923. In 1930, 625 were employed at the colliery. In July 1938 the pit closed due to flooding.

Littleburn colliery

In North Brancepeth the coal company secured the lease to Littleburn colliery, in 1870 sinking the engineer shaft to the Busty seam, followed by the merchant shaft to the Brockwell in 1871. In 1931 the company went into liquidation, and the pit was re-opened by Bearpark Coal and Coke Co. on a smaller scale to work the Busty seam, until flooding from the River Browney forced its closure in December 1950.

== Local government changes ==
Map of Brandon and surrounding area

In May 1877, under a newly confirmed provisional order, the Parish of Brandon and Byshottles was formed into a local government district governed by a local board, finally breaking away from the Parish of Brancepeth. After the Local Government Act 1894 came into force, the local board was superseded by the Brandon and Byshottles Urban District Council (UDC), which existed until 1974, when it was amalgamated with Durham City and Rural Councils to form the City of Durham District Council. This in turn was abolished as part of the 2009 structural changes to local government in England and has been replaced by a unitary Durham County Council. At the local level, the Brandon and Byshottles Parish, which is co-terminous with the pre-1974 UDC, is represented by a Parish Council, to which Brandon ward elects four members.
