= Durham railway station =

Railway station in County Durham, England

Durham
- The original station building, which is now the ticket hall

General information
- Location: Durham, County Durham, England
- Coordinates: 54°46′47″N 1°34′53″W
- Grid reference: NZ269428
- Owner: Network Rail
- Manager: London North Eastern Railway
- Platforms: 2
- Tracks: 3

Other information
- Station code: DHM
- Classification: DfT category C1

History
- Original company: North Eastern Railway
- Pre-grouping: North Eastern Railway
- Post-grouping: London and North Eastern Railway, British Rail (Eastern Region)

Key dates
- 1 April 1857: Opened

Passengers
- 2020/21: ▼0.473 million
- 2021/22: ▲2.092 million
- 2022/23: ▲2.447 million
- 2023/24: ▲2.604 million
- 2024/25: ▲2.810 million
Location
- Location within County Durham
Notes
- Passenger statistics from the Office of Rail and Road

Durham is a railway station on the East Coast Main Line, which runs between London King's Cross and Edinburgh Waverley; it is situated 14 miles 3 chains (14.0 miles; 22.6 kilometres) south of Newcastle. The station serves the cathedral city of Durham, in County Durham, England. It is owned by Network Rail and managed by London North Eastern Railway.

Durham is a through station with two platforms, located north of the city centre on a hill. To the south, the railway line approaches the station via the eleven arched Durham Viaduct, a major local landmark. After a renovation between 2006 and 2008, the original stone station building is now the ticket hall and main concourse.

== History ==
The city of Durham has been served by four stations, only one of which survives today:

- Shincliffe (called Shincliffe Town from 1861): located in nearby Shincliffe, this station was built in 1839 and was served by the Durham and Sunderland Railway, using rope haulage until 1856. It closed when Elvet station opened in the city centre. A second station, Shincliffe, on the Leamside to Ferryhill line, was opened in 1844; it closed to passengers in 1941.
- Durham (Gilesgate): opened in 1844 and within the city boundaries, it was served by a branch from Belmont on the Leamside Line, then the main line from London to Newcastle. Passenger services finished in 1857 with the opening of the current station on the branch from Leamside to Bishop Auckland, but it continued in use as a goods shed until final closure in 1966. Today, it has been redeveloped as a Travelodge hotel, while the serving track was used in the realignment of the A690 Gilesgate by-pass road.
- Durham: in 1857, a station at the current location and viaducts over North Road and the River Browney immediately to the south were built by the North Eastern Railway, on their Leamside to Bishop Auckland line to Bishop Auckland. The station was redeveloped in 1871, when the North Eastern Railway developed a new line from Tursdale through Relly Mill Junction to Durham, and onwards from Newton Hall Junction through Chester-le-Street to Newcastle Central, via the Team Valley. This became the current East Coast Main Line on 15 January 1872.
- Durham (Elvet): in 1893, the Durham-Sunderland branch was diverted from Shincliffe Town to a new station at Elvet, within the city's boundaries. It was closed to regular passenger services in 1931 and fully closed in 1953.

On grouping in 1923, the stations came under the control of the London and North Eastern Railway. Passenger services to Bishop Auckland and Sunderland via Penshaw were withdrawn by British Railways, under the Beeching cuts, on 4 May 1964.

The East Coast Main Line through Durham was electrified in 1991.

== Facilities ==
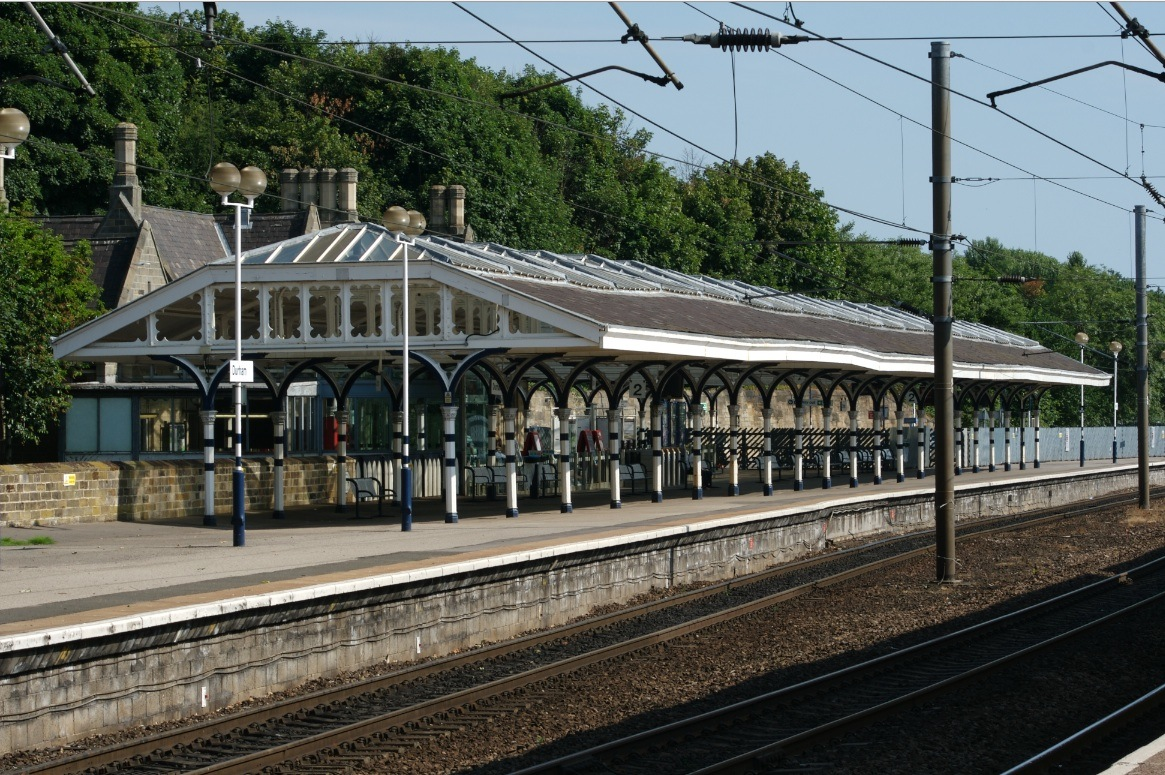
A view of the northbound platform

The northbound platform

It was refurbished between 2006 and 2008 by the operator Great North Eastern Railway and later National Express East Coast, which included a new passenger lounge, toilets, travel centre, glazed waiting area, lifts and shops. The entrance and ticket hall were moved from the "temporary" 1960s building into the original stone building following renovation and repairs. The works were completed in early 2008 and the newly renovated station won Best Medium Station and Overall Station of the Year at the 2008 National Rail Awards. Ticket barriers were installed in 2009.

After winning the InterCity East Coast rail franchise, former operator Virgin Trains East Coast (VTEC) opened an information office on platform 2, added new benches and perch seating, and installed wi-fi connections. In 2017, all ticket barriers were removed as part of VTEC's franchise commitment.

Durham County Council, working with the North East Local Enterprise Partnership, have completed a project to improve cycle routes and pedestrian access to the station from the north of the city. This involved the construction of a new cycle path as well as upgrades to road crossings on Framwellgate Peth.

In order to accommodate the new Classes 800 and 801 Azuma trains that entered service in mid-2019, platform 1 was extended north to a total length of 230 metres (750 ft).

== Services ==
As of December 2025 services are provided by four train operating companies, with the following general service pattern in trains per hour/day:

London North Eastern Railway:

- 1tph to London King's Cross, via Darlington, Northallerton, York, Grantham, Stevenage and Peterborough
- 1tph to Newcastle.
- Additional early morning and late evening services operate to/from Edinburgh Waverley via Newcastle

CrossCountry:

- 1tph to Edinburgh Waverley
  - 1tpd extends to Aberdeen and Glasgow Central
- 1tph to Plymouth, via York, Leeds, Sheffield, Derby, Birmingham New Street, Cheltenham Spa, Bristol Temple Meads, Taunton and Exeter St Davids
  - 1tpd extends to Cardiff Central and Penznace
- 1tp2h to Newcastle
- 1tp2h to Reading, via Doncaster, Birmingham New Street and Oxford.
  - 1tpd extends to Southampton Central

TransPennine Express:

- 1tph to Newcastle, via Chester-le-Street
- 1tph to Liverpool Lime Street, via York, Leeds, Huddersfield and Manchester Victoria and Newton-le-Willows.

Northern Trains:

- 3tpd to Newcastle; of which:
  - 1tpd extends to Carlisle, via Hexham
- 1tpd to Darlington.

Preceding station	National Rail	Following station
Darlington	London North Eastern Railway East Coast Main Line	Newcastle
Darlington	CrossCountry Cross Country Route	Newcastle
Darlington	TransPennine Express North TransPennine	Chester-le-Street
Darlington	Northern Trains Tees Valley line	Chester-le-Street
	Historical railways	
Croxdale; Line open, station closed	London and North Eastern Railway; East Coast Main Line	Plawsworth; Line open, station closed
Croxdale; Line open, station closed	London and North Eastern Railway; Leamside line	Leamside; Line and station closed
Brandon Colliery; Line and station closed	London and North Eastern Railway; Durham to Bishop Auckland Line	Terminus
Ushaw Moor; Line and station closed	London and North Eastern Railway; Dearness Valley Railway	Terminus
Aldin Grange for Bearpark; Line and station closed	London and North Eastern Railway; Lanchester Valley Railway	Terminus

== See also ==
- Durham Viaduct
