= Dearness Valley Railway =

UK railway company

The Dearness Valley Railway was an eight-mile-long single-track branch railway line that ran along the valley of the River Deerness in County Durham, England. Originated by the Dearness Valley Railway Company, it became part of the North Eastern Railway in 1857

It ran from Deerness Valley Junction, on the Durham to Bishop Auckland line, to the coal mines along the valley via two intermediate stations, Waterhouses, and Ushaw Moor.

== History ==
The line was primarily built to serve the collieries at Ushaw Moor, Waterhouses, Hamsteels, Esh, Cornsay, New Brancepeth and East Hedley Hope, and was opened to passengers only as an afterthought.

=== Opening ===
Dearness Valley Railway Act 1855
- Act of Parliament
- Parliament of the United Kingdom
- Long title: An Act to incorporate a Company for making a Railway from the Bishop Auckland Branch of the North-eastern Railway in the Township of Elvet to the Township of Brandon and Byshottles all in the County of Durham, to be called "The Dearness Valley Railway;" and for other Purposes.
- Citation: 18 & 19 Vict. c. clxxx

Dates
- Royal assent: 30 July 1855

Text of statute as originally enacted

Authorised by the Dearness Valley Railway Act 1855 (18 & 19 Vict. c. clxxx), the line opened to goods on New Year's Day 1858, but it was not until 1 November 1877 that the first passenger station, Waterhouses near Esh Winning, was opened. A second station was opened on 1 September 1884 at Ushaw Moor.

- A Railway commencing by a Junction with the Bishop Auckland Branch of the North-eastern Railway in a Field numbered 23 on the Plans of such Branch deposited with the Clerk of the Peace for the County of Durham in the Year One thousand eight hundred and fifty-one, in the Parish of Saint Oswald and Township of Elvet in the County of Durham, in the Occupation of Peter Robson, and thence passing from, in, through, or into the several Parishes, Townships, and Extra-parochial or other Places following, or some of them, (that is to say,) Saint Oswald, Elvet, Esh, Lanchester, Broom, Brandon and Byshottles, and Brancepeth, and terminating in a Field in the Township of Brandon and Byshottles, belonging to the Right Honourable Viscount Boyne, and in the Occupation of Thomas Button and William Button, or One of them, situate about One Quarter of a Mile Westwards of a Farmhouse called High Water Houses.
— Section 17, Dearness Valley Railway Act 1855 (18 & 19 Vict. c. clxxx)

=== Industries served ===
Beyond the East Hedley Hope junction, the line was known as Deerness Valley Branch of the Stockton and Darlington Railway, with the rope worked Stanley Inclines giving access to Stanley Drifts and Wooley Colliery.

The Dearness Valley Branch was authorised by the Stockton and Darlington Railway Act 1855 (18 & 19 Vict. c. cxlix).

- Fourthly, a Branch Railway to commence by a Junction with that Part of the Wear Valley Railway which was formerly called the Weardale Extension Railway near the Village of Crook in the Township of Crook and Billy Row in the Parish of Brancepeth in the County of Durham, and to terminate near a certain Farmhouse called High-water Houses in the Township of Brandon and Byeshottles in the Parish of Brancepeth, in the said County of Durham, together with Two Branch Railways from and out of the said last-mentioned intended Branch Railway aforesaid, one of such Branch Railways to terminate near to the North Roddymoor Colliery in the Township of Crook and Billy Row and Parish of Brancepeth, and the other of such Branch Railways to terminate at a Point near to a certain Farmhouse called Stanley in the Township of Crook and Billy Row and Parish of Brancepeth aforesaid
— Section 4, Stockton and Darlington Railway Act 1855 (18 & 19 Vict. c. cxlix)

The line then accessed Bank Foot Coke Works and Chemical Plant at Crook, where it junctioned with both the Weardale Extension Railway and the Stanhope and Tyne Railway. This section was built for Joseph Pease and Partners, the owners of Waterhouses Colliery who also owned the industrial complex at Bank Foot.

=== Closure ===
The entire line closed to passengers on 29 October 1951, and to freight on 28 December 1964.

== The site today ==
The trackbed became part of the Durham Railway Paths network in 1975.
