= Esh Winning =

Village in County Durham, England

Coordinates: 54.76977°N 1.70366°W

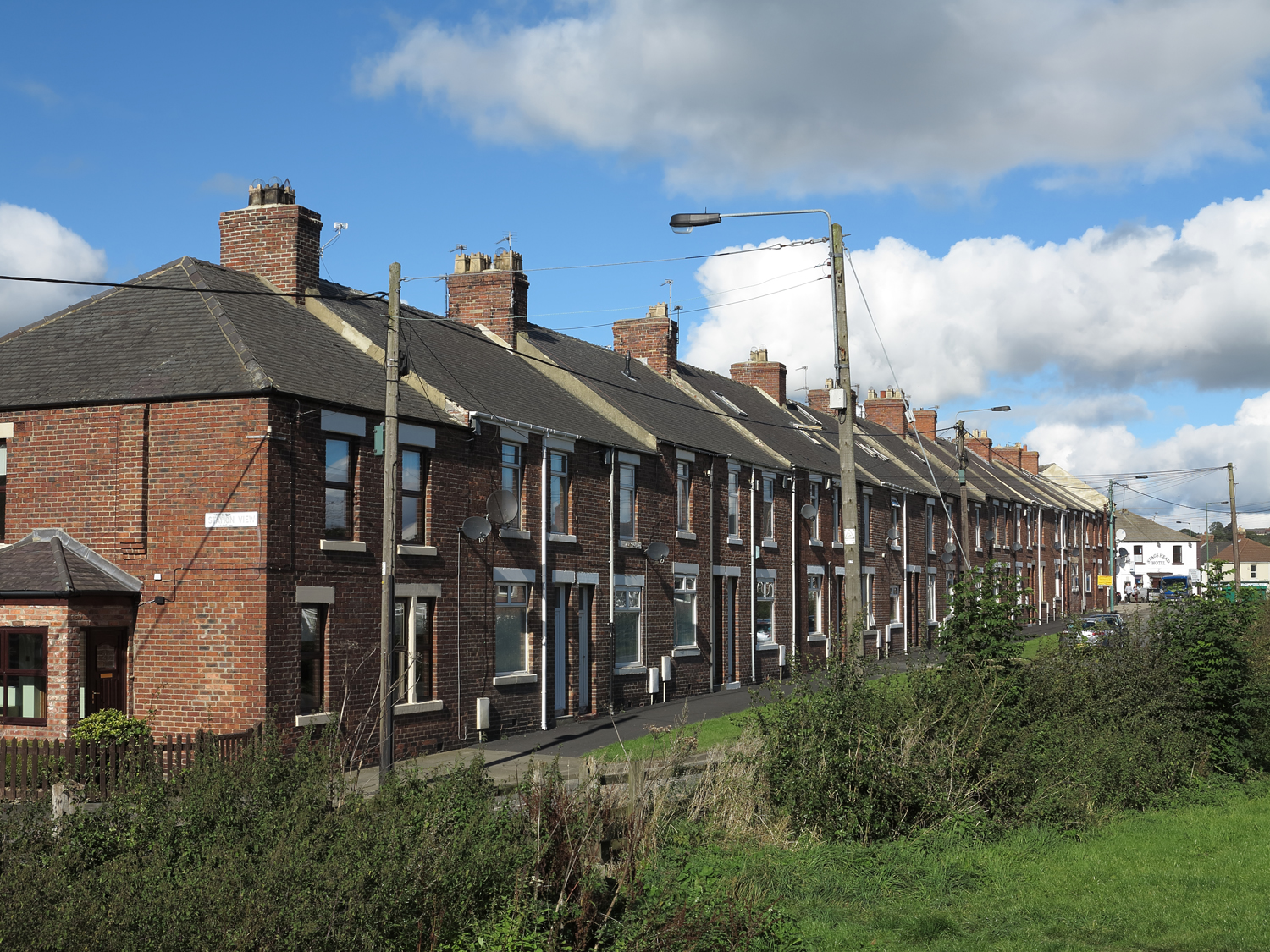
- Station View

- Location within County Durham
- Population: 3,666
- OS grid reference: NZ263443
- Civil parish: Brandon and Byshottles
- Unitary authority: County Durham
- Ceremonial county: County Durham
- Region: North East
- Country: England
- Sovereign state: United Kingdom
- Post town: DURHAM
- Postcode district: DH7
- Dialling code: 0191
- Police: Durham
- Fire: County Durham and Darlington
- Ambulance: North East
- UK Parliament: City of Durham

Esh Winning is a village, and location of a former colliery, in County Durham, England. It is situated in the Deerness Valley 5 miles (8 km) to the west of Durham.

== History ==
The village was founded by the Pease family in the 1850s to service a new mine on the Esh Estate. The name of the village comes from two elements, first the older nearby village of Esh, a Northumbrian term for Ash, and second Winning, which was a Victorian term used when coal was found.

Opencast mining was performed in the hills around the village from the late 1970s to 1990s, after which the land was reclaimed and restored.

In March 2006 the National Lottery granted £25,200 towards the restoration of the Esh Winning Colliery banner. The banner group planned to use the money to restore the banner, which was on display at Beamish Museum, and to produce a replica for display at the Durham Miners' Gala.

=== Railway history ===
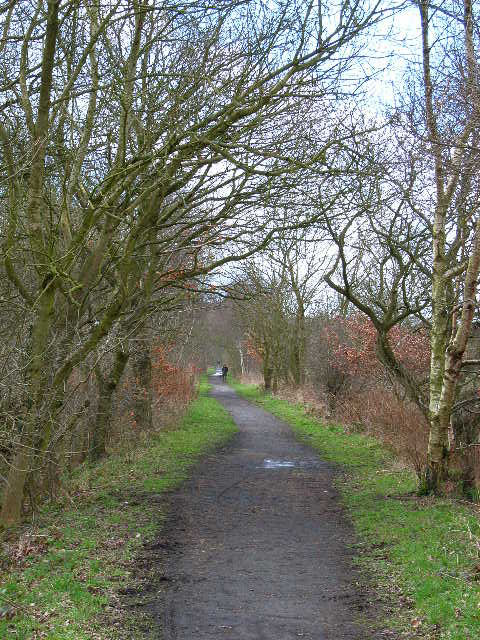
Deerness Valley Path near Esh Winning

The village was served by the stone-and timber-built Waterhouses railway station on the Deerness Valley Railway. Although the goods yard was located in the village of Waterhouses, passenger service was handled through Esh Winning. The station opened on 1 November 1877, and closed to passengers on 29 October 1951 and to freight on 28 December 1964. The route of the line is now part of the eight-mile Deerness Valley Railway Path.

=== Memorial Hall ===
The Grade II-listed Memorial Hall is one of the village's largest buildings; it was built in 1923 as a memorial to the miners killed in World War I. Initially it was used as a meeting hall and community centre, before being converted in the 1920s to a cinema and ballroom and renamed The Majestic by the locals.

The hall was designed by architect local J. A. Robson and built in Edwardian Baroque style with a number of rooms. It was perhaps a little too grand for a small community and experienced financial difficulties in the late 1920s, but continued to operate a cinema and ballroom for many decades afterwards. The hall became a makeshift barracks during World War II, and then a bingo hall and disco in the 1960s before being abandoned in the 1970s.

The building was disused since the 1970s, despite several attempts to restore and redevelop the building, none of which got beyond the planning stage. In 2009 the building was badly deteriorated with the roof collapsing and the facade in disrepair. The hall was saved from demolition by developer Michael Brett who planned to renovate the building as residences for vulnerable people. The project stalled, but recommenced in October 2011 with completion in 2012. Durham City MP Roberta Blackman-Woods officially opened the renamed Eshwin Hall on Friday, October 19.

The development was honoured in October 2012 at the County Durham Environment Awards. In 2013 the renovation of the Memorial Hall into Eshwin Hall was chosen for the City of Durham Trust Architectural Award of the Year.

== Environment ==
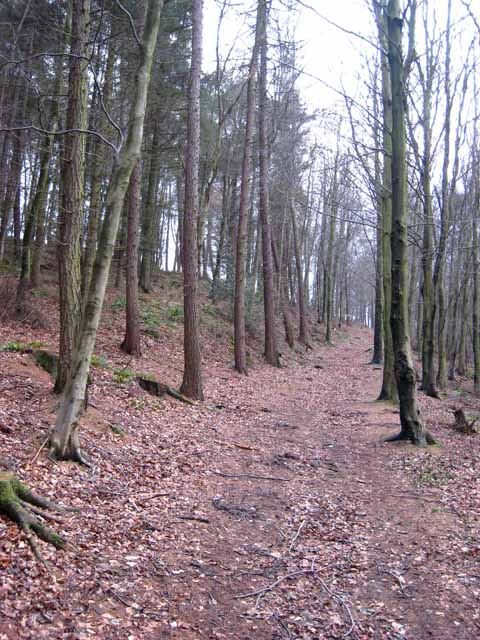
Footpath through Ragpath Wood

There are two environmental projects ongoing in the village.

In 1996 the 31-hectare Ragpath Wood was purchased by the Woodland Trust; the wood is to the south-east of the village bordering the Deerness Valley Walkway. The wood is on the site of an Ancient Woodland site, although it was felled during World War II and replanted in 1967.

The Esh Winning Eco-Learning Centre (EWE), based in the local primary school, is a training centre for the north-east area. It specialises in the provision of training around sustainable development and outdoor learning. It is funded by a number of key partners including Durham County Council, Surestart and is part of North East Strategic Partnership for Sustainable Schools. A number of environmental courses and initiatives are being run from the centre.

== Amenities ==
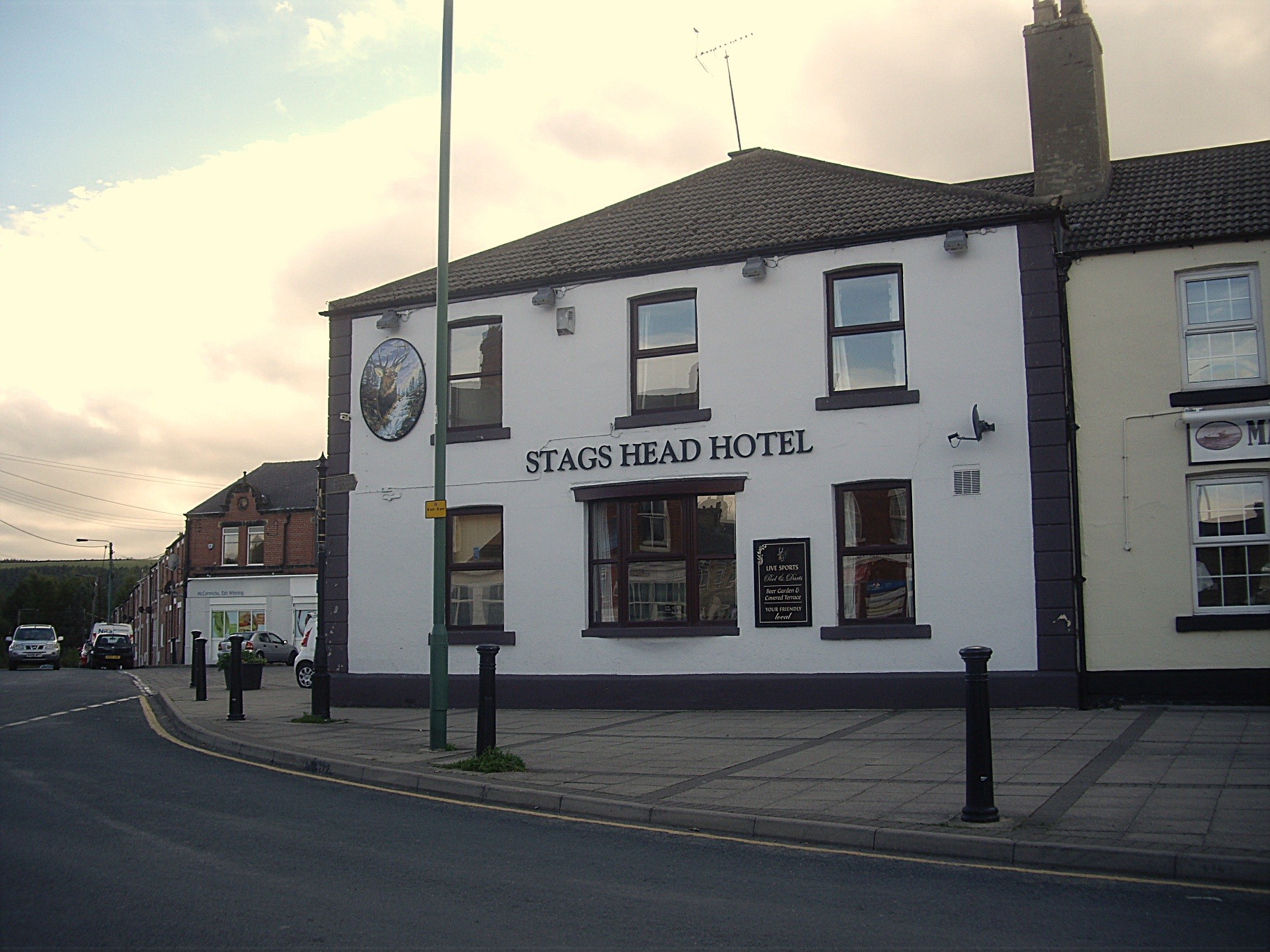
Stags Head Hotel

The village centre has a number of shops as well as the Stags Head Hotel.

Religious sites in the village include Our Lady Queen of Martyrs Roman Catholic Church.

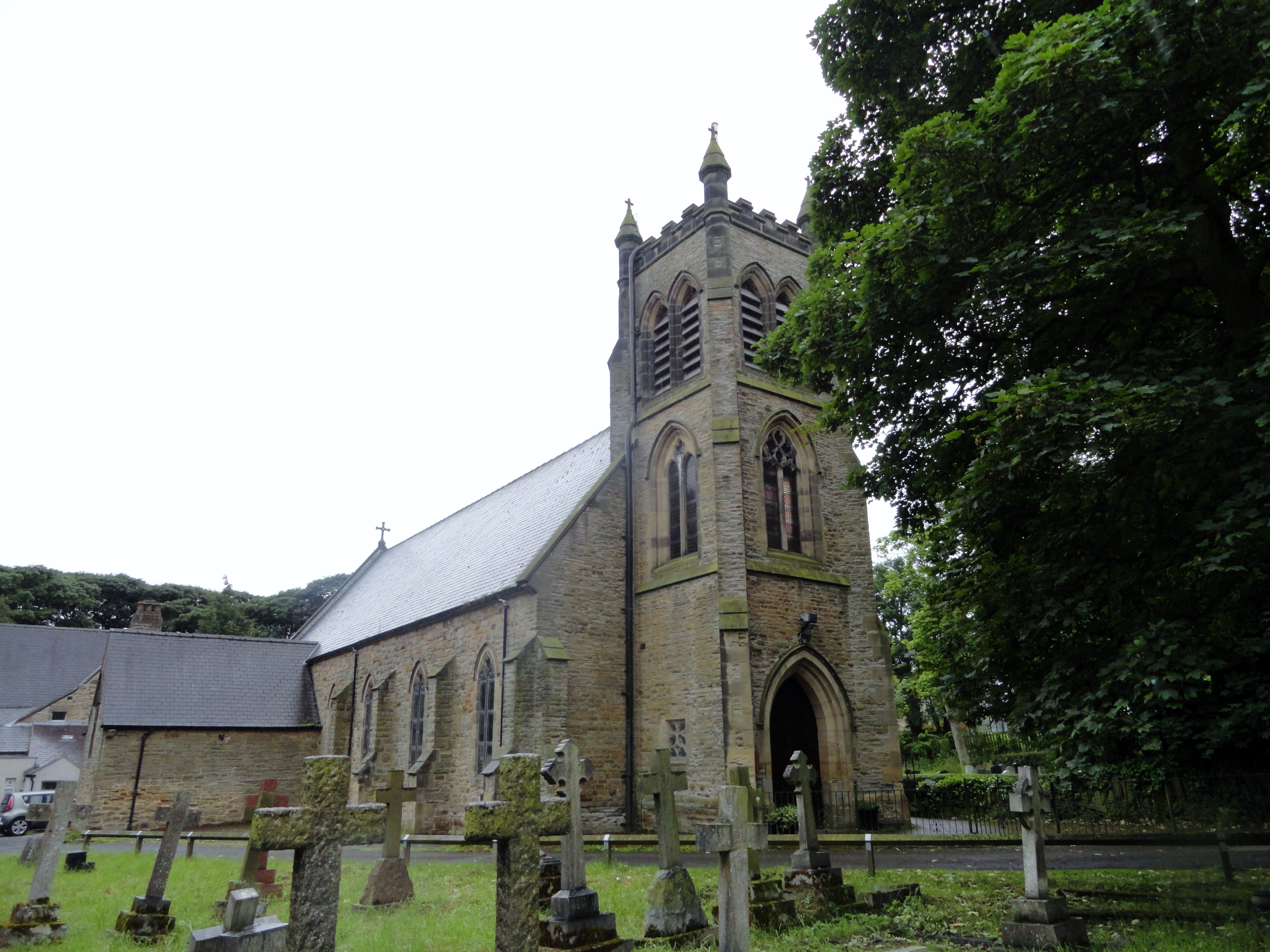
Our Lady Queen of Martyrs RC Church

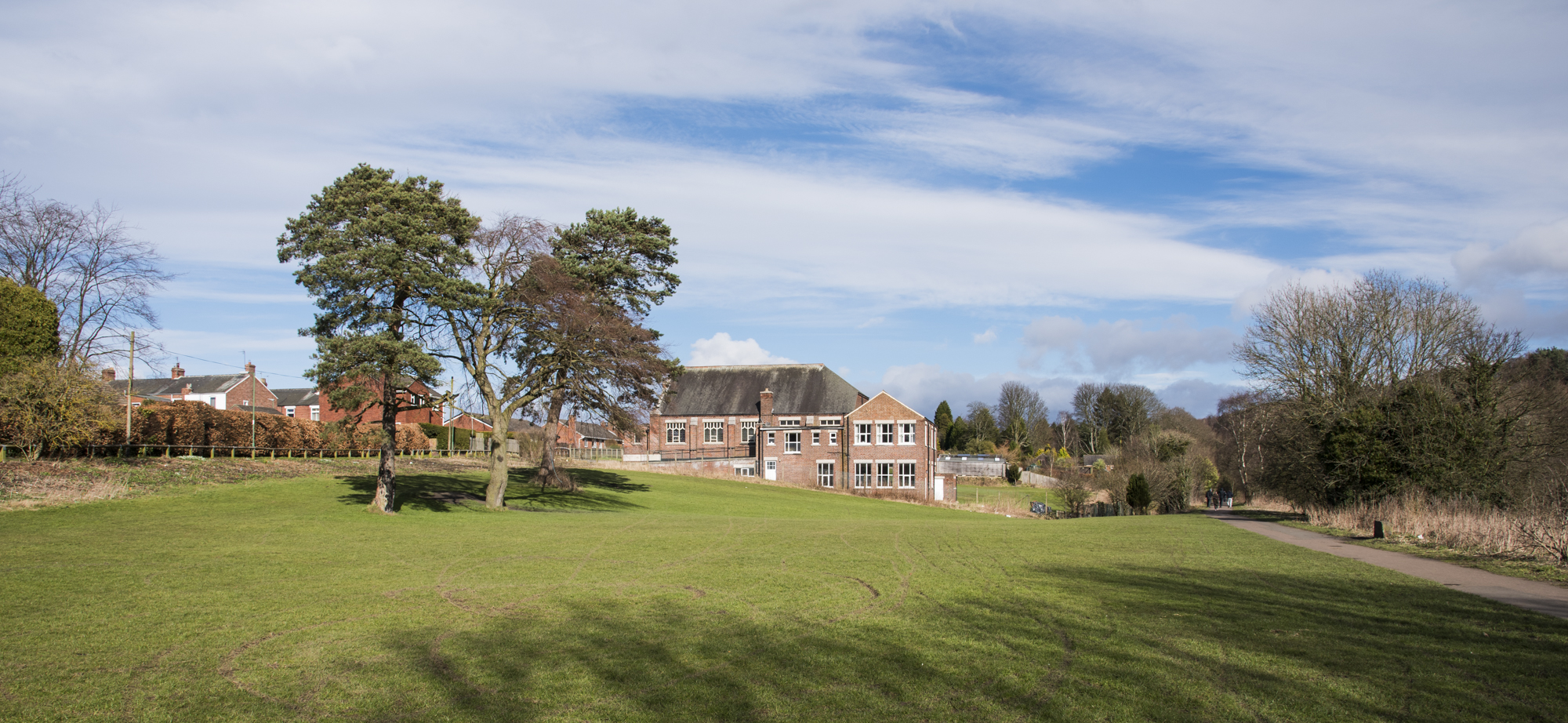
Former Methodist church

Esh Winning is home to Esh Winning Primary School.

== Sport ==
The village has a football team, Esh Winning F.C., who currently play in the Northern League Division Two, although their ground is in West Terrace in nearby Waterhouses.

Sir Bobby Robson, former manager of the England national football team, grew up in the neighbouring village of Langley Park and was educated for a time in Esh Winning. A local park has been named in his honour.

The village has a cricket team playing within the Durham County League.

== In media ==
The second episode of the 1975 series Days of Hope was set amongst the miners in Esh Winning during the 1921 lock-out.
