= Brancepeth, County Durham =

Village in County Durham, England

Coordinates: 54°44′N 1°39′W

Brancepeth
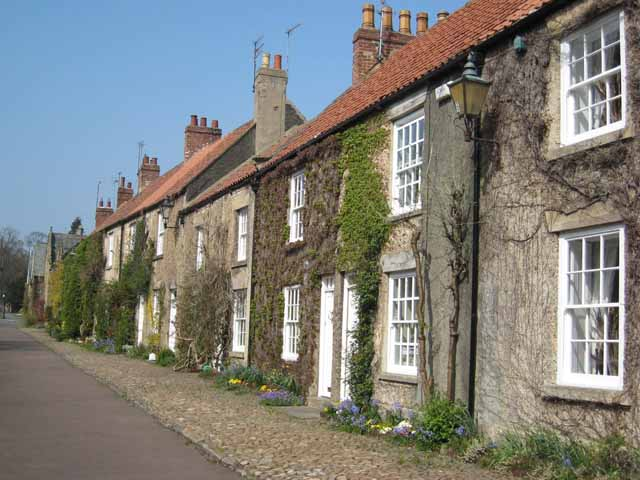
- The Village

- Location within County Durham
- Population: 414 (2011 census)
- Civil parish: Brancepeth
- Unitary authority: County Durham
- Ceremonial county: County Durham
- Region: North East
- Country: England
- Sovereign state: United Kingdom
- Post town: DURHAM
- Postcode district: DH7
- Dialling code: 0191
- Police: Durham
- Fire: County Durham and Darlington
- Ambulance: North East

Brancepeth is a village and civil parish in County Durham, in England. It is situated about 8 km (5 mi) from Durham on the A690 road between Durham and Weardale. The population of the civil parish taken at the 2011 census was 414.

== Name origin ==
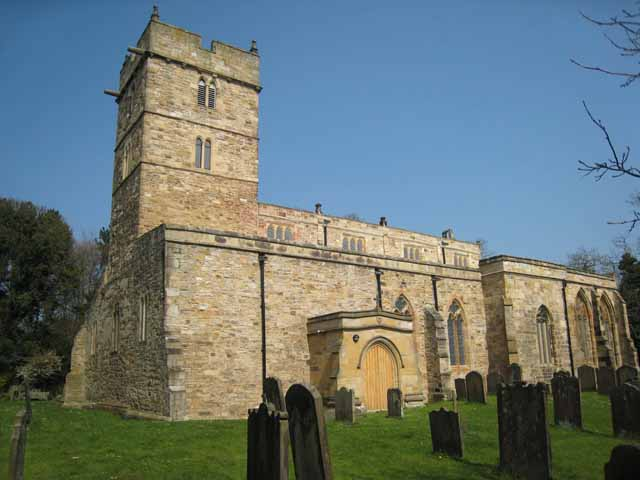
St Brandon's Church, Brancepeth

The name likely derives from "Bran's Path", after Saint Brandon, the parish church's patron saint. According to another story, the village's name is said to derive from "Brawn's Path". There is a legend that Brancepeth was once terrorised by an enormous brawn (boar), which was eventually killed by a knight named Sir Roger de Ferie in 1208. A commemorative stone marks the traditional location of the brawn's death.

== History ==
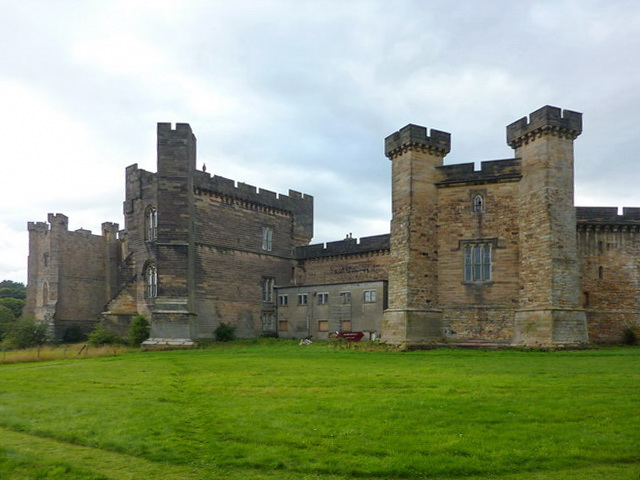
Brancepeth Castle

Brancepeth Castle was until 1570 the fortress of the Neville Earls of Westmorland. The castle was extensively modified and rebuilt in the 19th century by Viscount Boyne (later Baron Brancepeth). It was later a military hospital.

St Brandon's Church was famed for its exceptional 17th-century woodwork, until it was destroyed in a major fire in 1998; the church has since been restored and reroofed.

In 1924, Harry Colt laid out a golf course on the deer park which formed part of the estate surrounding the castle. A club house was created from the old coach house and stables and remains in use by Brancepeth Castle Golf Club.

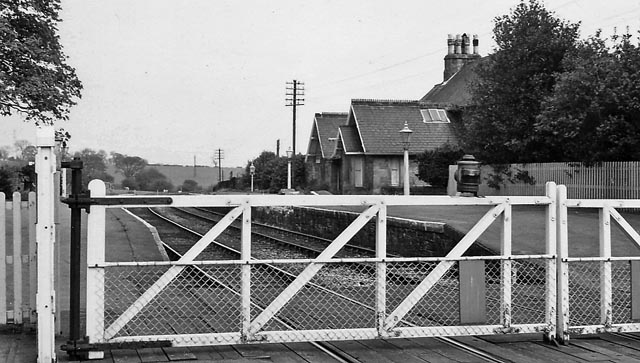
What remained of the local railway station in 1965.

== Notable residents ==
- Arthur Prowse (1907–1981)
- Frederick William Sanderson (1857–1922)
