= Five Capitals System =

Ancient government system in East Asia

Five Capitals System (Chinese: 五京制) refers to a management system involving multiple capital cities in several countries in ancient East Asia. The origins of the Five Capitals System are debated, with the earliest mention found in the Old Book of Tang, which was written in 945, referring to the five capitals set up by the Tang dynasty in 757. The Five Capitals System in the Bohai Kingdom was first recorded in the New Book of Tang (1044), but the exact date of its establishment is not mentioned. The Five Capitals System had a profound influence on the establishment of capitals in subsequent dynasties, including the Tang, Liao, and Jin dynasties, spanning over 400 years from the mid-8th century to the 13th century.

== Evolution ==
China has implemented a multi-capital system since the Western Zhou period. After the Zhou dynasty destroyed the Shang dynasty, King Wu of Zhou established Luoyi to control the eastern region. The setting up of five capitals originated in the mid-Tang dynasty. In 618, the Tang dynasty established Chang'an as the capital, and in 657, Henan Prefecture was made the Eastern Capital, a system of secondary capitals. In 690, Taiyuan Prefecture was established as the Northern Capital, and by 742, Chang'an became the Western Capital, with the Eastern Capital changed to Luoyang and the Northern Capital changed to Beijing. In December 757, Fengxiang Prefecture was established as the Western Capital, making it one of the Five Capitals along with Nanjing, Chengdu Prefecture, Zhongjing Jingzhao Prefecture, Dongjing Henan Prefecture, and Beijing Taiyuan Prefecture. This officially established the Five Capitals system of the Tang dynasty, which was abolished after 762. In the Bohai Kingdom in the northeast, a similar system was established, but the Bohai Kingdom did not leave a detailed record of its administrative system. The Bohai records are first found in the official Chinese historical works Old Book of Tang and New Book of Tang, and later scattered in various historical records, including those from Japan and Korea. The fall of the Bohai Kingdom is recorded in the "History of Liao."

At the beginning of the Liao dynasty, the capital was set at Longmei Palace, which became the Shangjing Linhuang Prefecture, established in 918. By 928, Dongping County became Nanjing, and by 938, the Liao had obtained the Sixteen Prefectures of Yanyun, changing Youzhou to Nanjing Xijin Prefecture. In 1009, a new capital was established on the banks of the Seven Gold Mountains in the former Khitan territory, modeled after the Song dynasty's capital, Bianliang, and named Zhongjing Dading Prefecture. In 1044, Yunzhou became the Western Capital, with Daming Prefecture in Datong, marking the official establishment of the Five Capitals System in the Liao dynasty, which lasted until its fall in 1125.

The Jin dynasty initially adopted the Liao's Five Capitals system, retaining the same names. In 1138, the capital was established at Shangjing Huining Prefecture, and the original Liao Shangjing Linhuang Prefecture was renamed Beijing. Along with the Song dynasty's capital Bianjing Kaifeng Prefecture, the Jin dynasty now had seven capitals. In 1150, during the early years of the Tian De reign, the capital designation of Linhuang Prefecture was abolished; three years later, the capital moved to Yanjing, and the title of Shangjing Huining Prefecture was also abolished. The Daming Prefecture in Zhongjing was renamed Beijing, and the Kaifeng Prefecture in Song was renamed Nanjing. The Five Capitals system was restored, and it remained in place until 1173, when Huining Prefecture was re-established as Shangjing. The Jin dynasty's six capitals system continued until its fall.

== The Five Capitals in various dynasties ==
=== Tang dynasty ===
- Beijing Taiyuan Prefecture (now Shanxi Taiyuan)
- Dongjing Henan Prefecture (now Henan Luoyang)
- Zhongjing Jingzhao Prefecture (now Shaanxi Xi'an)
- Nanjing Chengdu Prefecture (now Sichuan Chengdu)
- Xijing Fengxiang Prefecture (now Shaanxi Fengxiang)

=== Bohai Kingdom ===
- Shangjing Longquan Prefecture (now near Mudanjiang, Heilongjiang)
- Dongjing Longyuan Prefecture (now near Hunchun, Jilin)
- Zhongjing Xiande Prefecture (now near Helong, Jilin)
- Nanjing Nanhai Prefecture (now near Chongjin, North Korea)
- Xijing Yalu Prefecture (now near Baishan, Jilin)

=== Liao dynasty ===
- Liao Shangjing Linhuang Prefecture (now Chifeng, Inner Mongolia)
- Dongjing Liaoyang Prefecture (now Liaoning Liaoyang)
- Zhongjing Dading Prefecture (now Ningcheng, Inner Mongolia)
- Nanjing Xijin Prefecture (now Beijing)
- Xijing Datong Prefecture (now Shanxi Datong)

=== Song dynasty ===
- Dongjing Kaifeng Prefecture (now Henan Kaifeng)
- Xijing Luoyang Prefecture (now Henan Luoyang)
- Beijing Daming Prefecture (now Hebei Handan)
- Nanjing Yingtian Prefecture (now Henan Shangqiu)
- Lin'an Prefecture (now Zhejiang Hangzhou)

=== Jin dynasty ===
- Dongjing Liaoyang Prefecture (now Liaoning Liaoyang)
- Xijing Daming Prefecture (now Shanxi Datong)
- Beijing Dading Prefecture (now Inner Mongolia Ningcheng)
- Shangjing Huining Prefecture (now Harbin, Heilongjiang)
- Zhongjing Daxing Prefecture (now Beijing)
- Nanjing Kaifeng Prefecture (now Henan Kaifeng)

== Debates on the Origin of the Bohai Five Capitals ==
=== Tang Origin Theory ===
Those who support the idea that the Five Capitals System originated from the Tang dynasty argue that the Bohai Kingdom first set up its five capitals between the reigns of Mun of Balhae (737-793) and Seon of Balhae (818-830), citing evidence from historical records such as the New Book of Tang.

=== Bohai Origin Theory ===
Some scholars argue that the Bohai Five Capitals System was established earlier than the Tang dynasty's Five Capitals, with records from the "New Book of Tang" and "Liao History" indicating the system's development under various rulers of Bohai.

=== Goguryeo Origin Theory ===
Some suggest that the Bohai Kingdom's five capitals system inherited from the Goguryeo Five Provinces system, while others believe it was based on the Central Plains' Five Regional System.

=== Silla Origin Theory ===
This theory is based on records from the "Three Kingdoms Chronicles" (1145), which document five small capitals established between 557 and 685.

== See also ==
- Beijing (disambiguation)
- Dongjing (disambiguation)
- Nanjing (disambiguation)
- Xijing (disambiguation)
- Zhongjing
- Shangjing (disambiguation)
