= 京 =

京 is the Han character meaning "capital (city)," and the simplified form of the older way of writing the character, 亰. The character is predominantly used in the names of current and former capital cities within the East Asian cultural sphere.

== Current city names ==
- Beijing, People's Republic of China (北京, "northern capital")
- Nanjing, People's Republic of China (南京, "southern capital")
- Tokyo, Japan (東京, "eastern capital")
- Kyoto, Japan (京都, "capital city")

== Former city names ==
- Gyeongseong (京城, "capital city") one of the former names of Seoul during Japan's occupation of Korea
- Shèngjīng (盛京, "rising capital") one of the former names of Shenyang as the Manchu capital
- Xinjing (新京, "new capital") former name of Changchun as the capital of Japanese puppet state Manchukuo
- Gaegyeong (開京, "open capital") or Kaesong (開城, "capital castle"), two of the former names of Kaesong
- Đông Kinh (東京, "eastern capital"), one of the former names of Hanoi; see Tonkin

== Other uses ==
- 京 (Kyo (musician)), a Japanese musician known as the vocalist of Dir En Grey
- The Chinese number 京 jīng and the Japanese number 京 kei, both meaning ten quadrillion (10,000,000,000,000,000)

== See also ==
- Kyo (disambiguation)
- Symbols of Tokyo § Metropolitan crest, for the relation of the character 京 to the crest design
- 東京 (disambiguation)
- Nanjing (disambiguation)
- Beijing (disambiguation)
- 西京 (disambiguation)
- Shangjing (disambiguation)
