= Battle of Nanjing (disambiguation) =

There have been several battles set in and around the city of Nanjing, China. Nanjing was previously named Jianye (before 313 CE) and Jiankang (313-1368 CE). During the 19th and 20th centuries, Nanking was a popular romanization of the name in European sources. The Battle of Nanjing may refer to:

Jianye:

- The 280 CE fall of Jianye to the Jin dynasty

Jiankang:

- The 549 CE Sack of Jiankang by the Liang dynasty

Nanjing (Nanking):

- The 1402 Sack of Nanjing during the Ming dynasty succession war that brought the Yongle Emperor to power
- The 1659 Battle of Nanjing, an attack by Koxinga on Qing-controlled Nanjing during the Transition from Ming to Qing
- The First Battle of Nanjing (1853), during the Taiping Rebellion
- The Second Battle of Jiangnan (1856), during the Taiping Rebellion
- The Third Battle of Nanjing (1864), during the Taiping Rebellion
- The Nanking Uprising during the 1911 Xinhai Revolution
- The 1927 capture of Nanjing by the Nationalist Army during the Northern Expedition, which was followed by the Nanking incident
- The 1937 Battle of Nanking, when the Japanese captured Nanjing during the Second Sino-Japanese War
  - The subsequent Nanjing Massacre by the Japanese Army against Chinese civilians

== See also ==
- Nanjing Incident (disambiguation)
- Nanjing (disambiguation)
- Jiankang (disambiguation)
- Jianye (disambiguation)
