= Nanjing Incident =

Nanjing Incident may refer to:

- Nanjing incident of 1616, trial of Jesuit missionaries during the Ming dynasty
- Nanking incident of 1927, anti-foreigner riots during the Northern Expedition
- Nankin Jiken used in some Japanese sources for the 1937 Nanjing Massacre
- Nanjing Incident (1976), movement opposed to the Cultural Revolution

== See also ==
- Nanjing (disambiguation)
- Battle of Nanjing (disambiguation)
