= Oi Yoi Yoi =

Painting by Roger Hilton

Oi Yoi Yoi, 1963, Tate Gallery.

Oi Yoi Yoi is a 1963 oil painting by British painter Roger Hilton. Perhaps Hilton's best-known work, it is a free composition depicting a naked woman. The central figure is abstracted and unpainted canvas, with simple black outlines drawn in charcoal of a featureless face, breasts and pubic triangle, and upraised arms. All four limbs are cut off at the edges of the frame. The white body contrasts with bold segments of background colour in yellow and red, blue and black. The work is inscribed on the back "Oi, yoi, yoi/Hilton/Dec 63".

According to Hilton, the painting was inspired by a drunken argument with his second wife, Rose Hilton, who was dancing on a verandah, nude, shouting "oi yoi yoi", a Yiddish expression of frustration or exasperation. According to his wife, the argument took place in France in the summer of 1962, before they were married. Hilton has rejected the suggestion that he took conscious inspiration from paintings of dancers and bathers by Cézanne or Matisse, but admitted they were "probably subconsciously" important.

The painting was exhibited in the British Pavilion at the Venice Biennale in 1964. It was also exhibited in a retrospective exhibition of Hilton's work at the Serpentine Gallery in 1974, along with a second version of the same subject, Dancing Woman, which has as similar central figure but more muted background colours limited to blue, black and yellow. Oi Yoi Yoi was purchased from the artist by the Tate Gallery in 1974 through Waddington Galleries, and may be displayed at Tate Britain in London; from 2016 it was displayed at Tate St Ives. Dancing Woman was purchased by the Scottish National Gallery of Modern Art in Edinburgh in 1981. Both works measure 60 inches (150 cm) by 50 inches (130 cm).

The paintings have similarities with the Dancing Beijing logo for the 2008 Beijing Olympic Games, designed by Guo Chunning, which was inspired by the Chinese character 京 (jīng, meaning "capital"), and also resembles a dancing figure with arms raised, or a runner crossing a finishing line.
