= Bairin =

Bairin may refer to:

- Bairin Left Banner, subdivision of Inner Mongolia, China
- Bairin Right Banner, subdivision of Inner Mongolia, China
- Bairin Park, in Gifu, Gifu Prefecture, Japan

== See also ==
- Bairin Station, in Yagi, Hiroshima Prefecture, Japan
