= Kyo =

Kyo or KYO may refer to:

== People ==
- Kyo (musician), Japanese singer-songwriter
- Machiko Kyō (京 マチ子; 1924–2019), Japanese actress
- Nobuo Kyo (姜 暢雄; born 1979), Japanese actor
- Kyō Noguchi (野口 恭; 1939–2009), Japanese former professional boxer
- Kyo Kawakami (川上 叶; born 1995), Japanese kickboxer
- Kiuchi Kyō (木内 キヤウ; 1884–1964), Japanese educator and politician
- Kyo Koike (小池 恭; 1878-1947), Japanese-American poet
- Kyo Yoshida (吉田 杏; born 1995), Japanese rugby union player
- Kyo Maclear (born 1970), Canadian novelist and children's author
- Kyo Sato (佐藤 響; born 2000), Japanese footballer
- Kyo Kaneko, VTuber affiliated with Nijisanji
- Kyo, Japanese singer of the rock band D'erlanger

== Arts and entertainment ==
- Kyo Kusanagi, fictional character in video game series The King of Fighters
- Kyo Sohma, fictional characters in manga series Fruits Basket
- Demon Eyes Kyo, fictional character in the manga series Samurai Deeper Kyo
- Kyo, a 1996 Japanese manga series by Ryōji Minagawa
- Kyo (band), a French rock band, and the title of their first album

== Other uses ==
- Kyo Burn, part the River Team, in County Durham, England
- Khandikar railway station, in Assam, India, station code KYO
- Klon language, in Indonesia, ISO 639-3 language code kyo

== See also ==
- Kyoto, a city in Japan
- East Kyo, West Kyo and New Kyo, villages in County Durham, England
