= Oy vey =

Yiddish phrase expressing dismay or exasperation

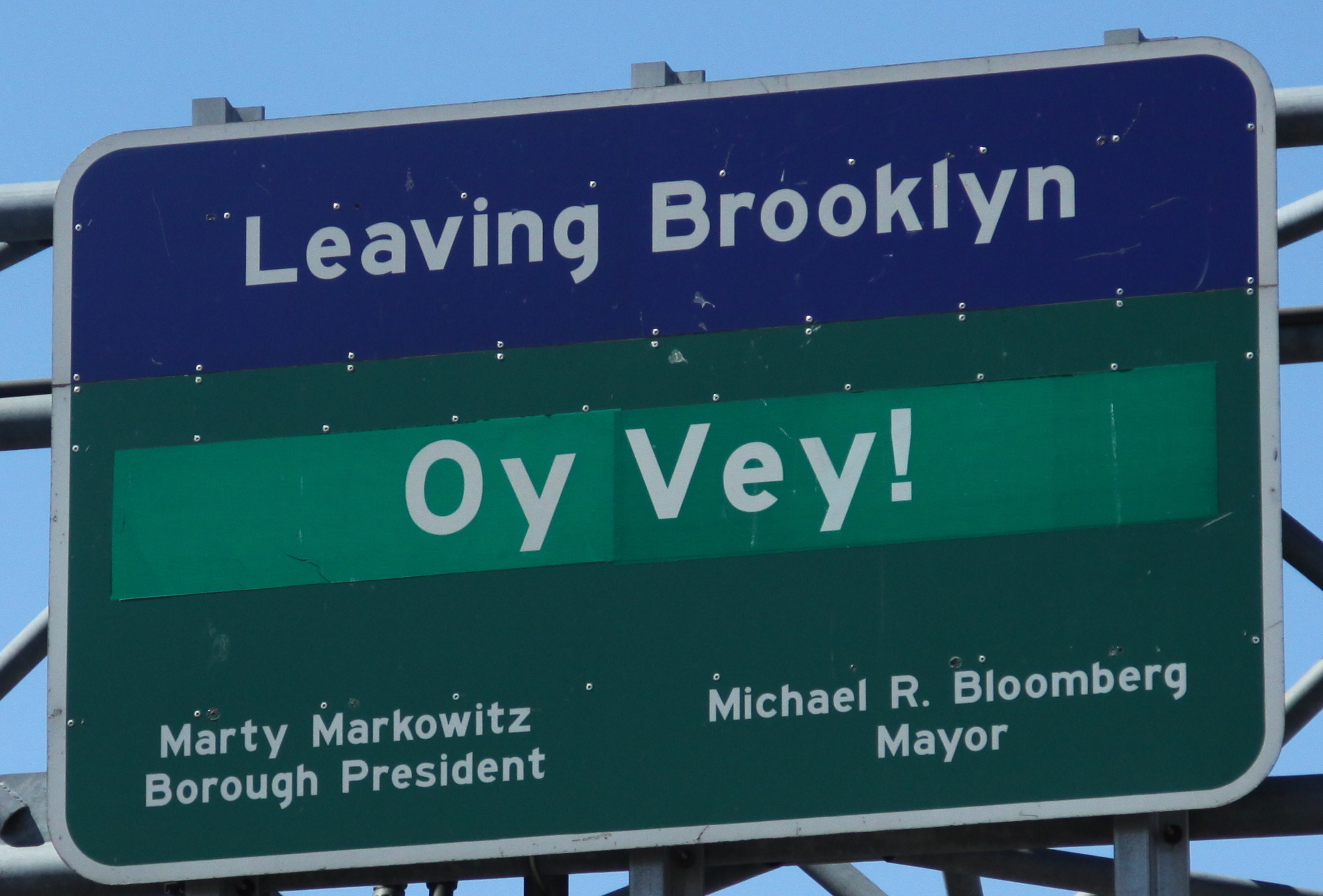
Sign on the Williamsburg Bridge leaving Brooklyn

Oy vey (Yiddish: אױ װײ) is a Yiddish phrase expressing dismay or exasperation. Also spelled oy vay, oy veh, or oi vey, and often abbreviated to oy, the expression may be translated as "oh, woe!" or "woe is me!" Its Hebrew equivalent is oy vavoy (אוֹי וַאֲבוֹי, óy va'avóy). Sometimes the phrase is elongated to oi yoi yoi (with the yoi being repeated as many times as desired).

== Derivation ==
According to etymologist Douglas Harper, the phrase is derived from Yiddish and is of Germanic origin. It is cognate with the German expression o weh, or auweh, combining the German and Dutch exclamation au! meaning "ouch/oh" and the German word Weh, a cognate of the English word woe (as well as the Dutch wee meaning pain). The expression is also related to oh ve, an older expression in Danish and Swedish, and oy wah, an expression used with a similar meaning in the Montbéliard region in France. The Latin equivalent is heu, vae!; a more standard expression would be o, me miserum, or heu, me miserum.

According to Chabad.org, an alternative theory for the origin of the Yiddish expression is that "oy" stems from Biblical Hebrew, and that "vey" is its Aramaic equivalent. It is alternatively spelled אוי, הוי, or הו in Biblical Hebrew and ווי, וי, ואי, and ויא in Aramaic. The term is occasionally doubled, as הוֹ־הוֹ in Amos 5:16 and וי וי in Targum Pseudo-Jonathan on that verse, but two versions were never combined classically.

== Significance ==
The expression is often abbreviated to simply oy, or elongated to oy vey iz mir ("Oh, woe is me"). The fuller lament is sometimes found as the more Germanic oy vey ist mir. The main purpose or effect of elongating it is often dramatic, something like a "cosmic ouch". An Oy is not merely an ordinary word, but rather expresses an entire world view, according to visual anthropologist Penny Wolin. Its meaning is approximately opposite that of mazel tov. A related expression is oy gevalt, which can have a similar meaning, or also express shock or amazement.

== Antisemitic usage ==
"Oy vey" has been used as an antisemitic dog whistle to imply that the person referred to is Jewish or of Jewish origin, commonly posted under videos or other media. It is similar to, and often used in the same context as, the triple parentheses also known as "an echo". In March 2019 the phrase "Oy vey! This is MAGA country" was one of many used to vandalize Jewish headstones. The phrase was also used with the antisemitic catchphrase "The Goyim Know" seen with "Oy vey, the Goyim Know". "Oy vey, it's anuddah shoah!" a mocking way of saying "Oh woe, it's another Holocaust" used to belittle those who are against antisemitism.

== Similar phrases ==
There exist similar phrases in other languages, such as German: Au weia, German: Oh weh Dutch: ach en wee, Swedish: ack och ve, Polish: Ojojoj etc. Also compare Yiddish: אוי געוואַלד (oy gevald), meaning “oh woe”.

== See also ==
- List of English words of Yiddish origin
- Antisemitism
- Istighfar
- Oi (interjection), a similar-sounding English exclamation, said to also have older European origins
- Oi Yoi Yoi, 1963 painting by painter Roger Hilton
