= David Cornell (artist) =

British sculptor, coin designer and painter

David Cornell is an English sculptor, coin designer and painter.

Born in London in 1935, Cornell studied at the Central School of Arts and Crafts between 1950 and 1956 studying under Roger Hilton; the Harrow School of Art from 1965 to 1966; and the Pennsylvania Academy of the Fine Arts in 1968, studying anatomy under Robert Beverley Hale.

Between 1953 and 1967, he was awarded six Arts Council Awards, and was elected a fellow of the Royal Society of Art in 1970, a fellow of the Royal Society of British Sculptors in 1971, and vice-president of the Society of Portrait Sculptors in 1977.

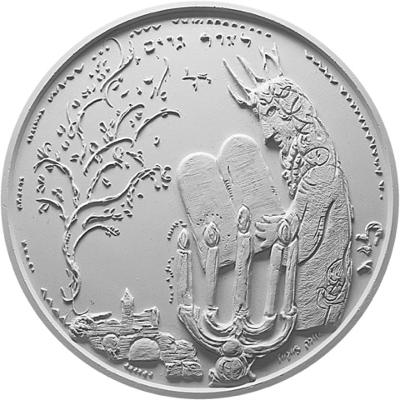
Plaster model of a medal sculpted by Cornell based on a drawing by Chagall

In July 1978 and February 1979, Cornell collaborated with Marc Chagall in France on a medal for Le Médaillier Franklin based on a drawing by Chagall that was commissioned for the project.

Among over 2000 official coins for the UK and various Commonwealth countries around the world, Cornell is known for designing the portrait of Diana, Princess of Wales £5 coin issued by the Royal Mint in 1999.

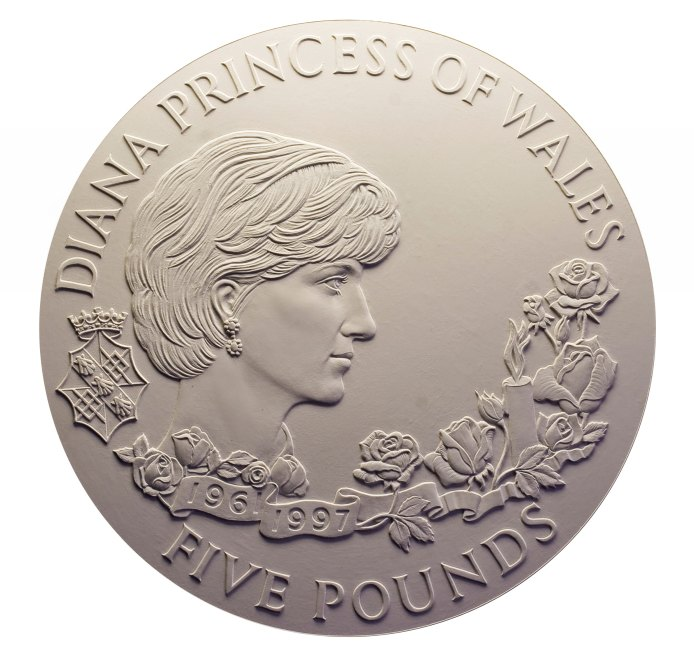
Plaster model of Cornell's original design for the Princess Diana coin. The final version omits the decorative elements such as the candle and roses.

His other works include a 50p coin commemorating the 50th anniversary of the creation of the National Health Service issued by the Royal Mint in 1998 and the 50p Olympic judo coin issued by the Royal Mint in celebration of the 2012 Summer Olympics.

His public works include a life-size bronze sculpture of Sir Arthur Conan Doyle, the author of the Sherlock Holmes stories, which is situated at Cloke's Corner in Crowborough in the UK. The sculpture was commissioned in 1998 by Crowborough Town Council to commemorate the author's residence in the town.

To commemorate the 250th anniversary of the birth of Robert Burns, the renowned Scottish poet, Cornell was commissioned to design and sculpt a white marble bust, which is on public display in St. Michael's & South Parish Church in Dumfries, Scotland.

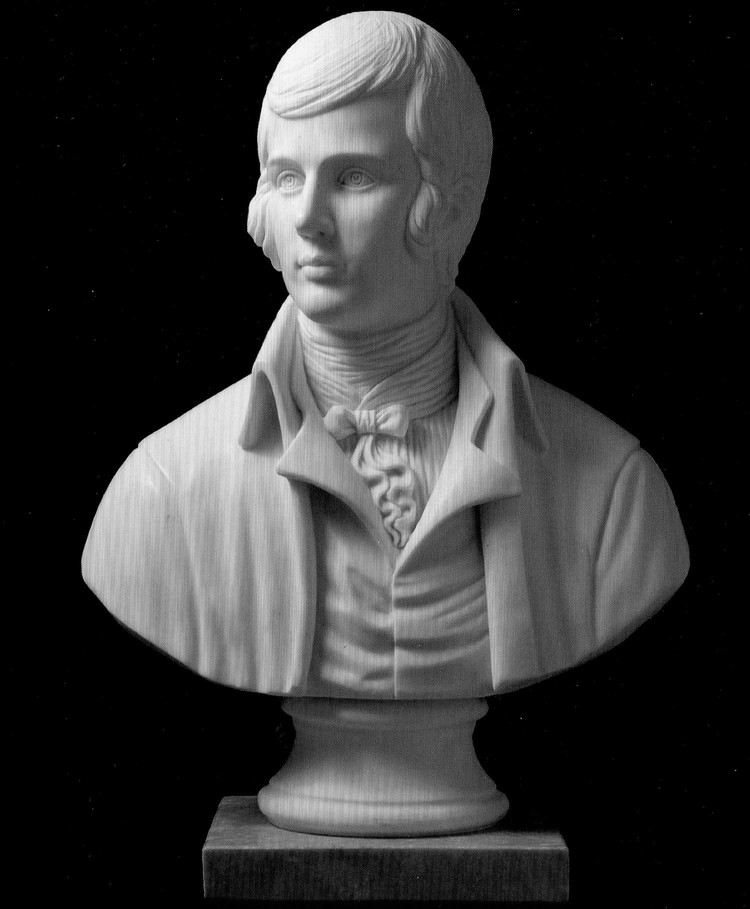
Marble bust of Robert Burns
