= Oxhill =

Oxhill or Ox Hill may refer to the following places:

- Oxhill, County Durham, a village in England
- Oxhill, Warwickshire, a village in England
- Ox Hill, a subordinate peak of Mount Toby, in Massachusetts
- Ox Hill, on the list of summits of the San Francisco Bay Area
- Ox Hill, one of the neighborhoods of Norwich, Connecticut

== See also ==
- Oxon Hill
