= Saikyo =

Saikyo may refer to:

- Saikyō Line, a Japanese railway line in the Tokyo metropolitan area
- Saikyō Maru, a Japanese ship involved in the Battle of the Yalu River (1894)
- Western Capital (disambiguation) (Japanese: 西京, romanized: Saikyō), several topics
- Psikyo (Japanese: 彩京, romanized: Saikyō), a Japanese game developer

People with the surname Saikyo include:

- Haruma Saikyo (born 1998), Japanese kickboxer
- Yuma Saikyo (born 2000), Japanese kickboxer
