= Third Man Theatre =

Theatre company based in London and Cornwall

Third Man Theatre is a theatre company based in London and Cornwall founded in 2007 by Dan Frost, Mark Knightley and Eddie Elks. Third Man Theatre have toured extensively throughout the UK to various theatres and festivals.

== Productions ==
=== Previous ===
- The Line Between by Dan Frost and Mark Knightley (Edinburgh Festival, August 2007)
- Stalag Happy by Eddie Elks and Dan Frost (Edinburgh Festival/ National Tour, 2009–2011)
- The One That Got Away (September 2011, St.Ives September Festival)
- Botallack O'Clock by Eddie Elks (August 2011 – present)

=== Current ===
- Botallack O'Clock will be performed at various venues throughout 2012 including Edinburgh Festival and Aldeburgh Art Festival.
