= Nanjingese =

Nanjingese or Nanjingnese may refer to:

- The people or culture of Nanjing, China
- The dialects spoken in Nanjing
  - Nanjing dialect
  - Nanjingese Wu dialects

== See also ==
- Nanjing (disambiguation)
