= Oxhill, County Durham =

Village in County Durham, England

Coordinates: 54.867°N 1.707°W

Oxhill
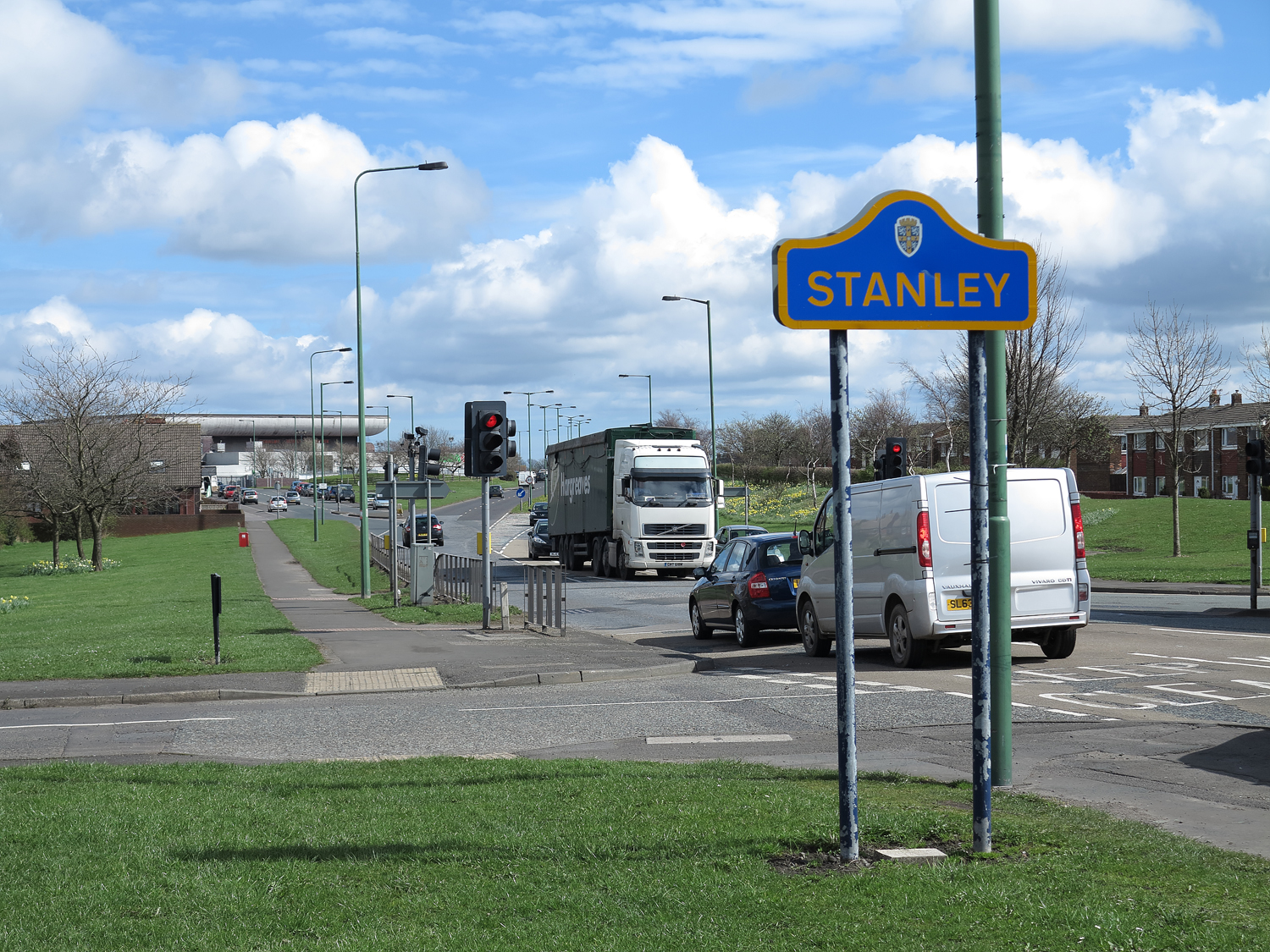
- A693 entering Stanley

- Location within County Durham
- OS grid reference: NZ189524
- Civil parish: Stanley
- Unitary authority: County Durham
- Ceremonial county: Durham
- Region: North East
- Country: England
- Sovereign state: United Kingdom
- Post town: DURHAM
- Postcode district: DH9
- Police: Durham
- Fire: County Durham and Darlington
- Ambulance: North East

Oxhill is a small village in the civil parish of Stanley, in County Durham, England. It is located to the west of Stanley, on the bottom of the hill which leads up to New Kyo and Annfield Plain to its east. Down the hill to the north are the C2C cycle path, East Kyo and Harperley. Oxhill contains very little: a few households, a pub called The Ox (frequented by locals and occasional cyclists from the nearby C2C cycle path taking lunch - the pub used to be known for weekend live music as well as food) and the main nursery school for the Stanley area.

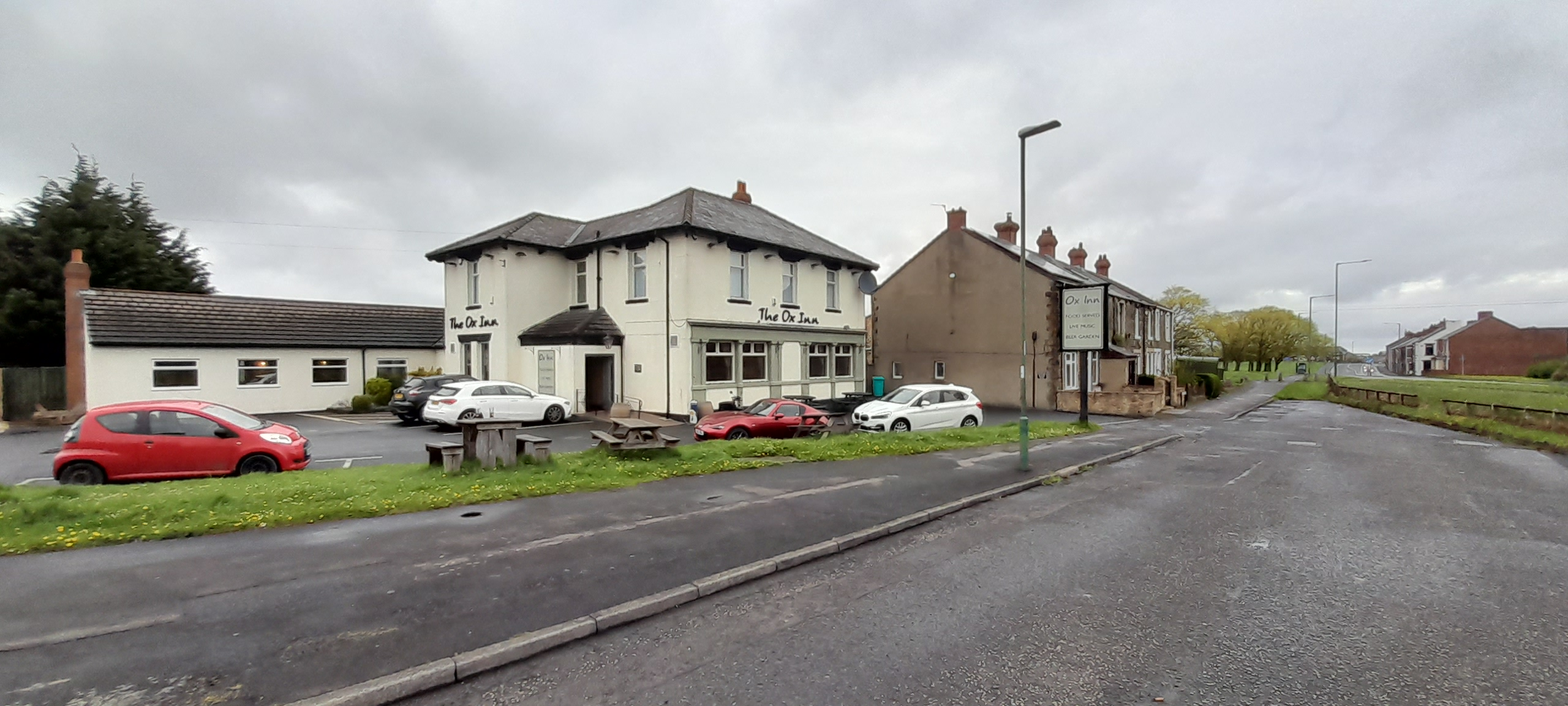
Ox Inn, Oxhill, County Durham. Local pub catering for food and not as commonly as before COVID, live music.

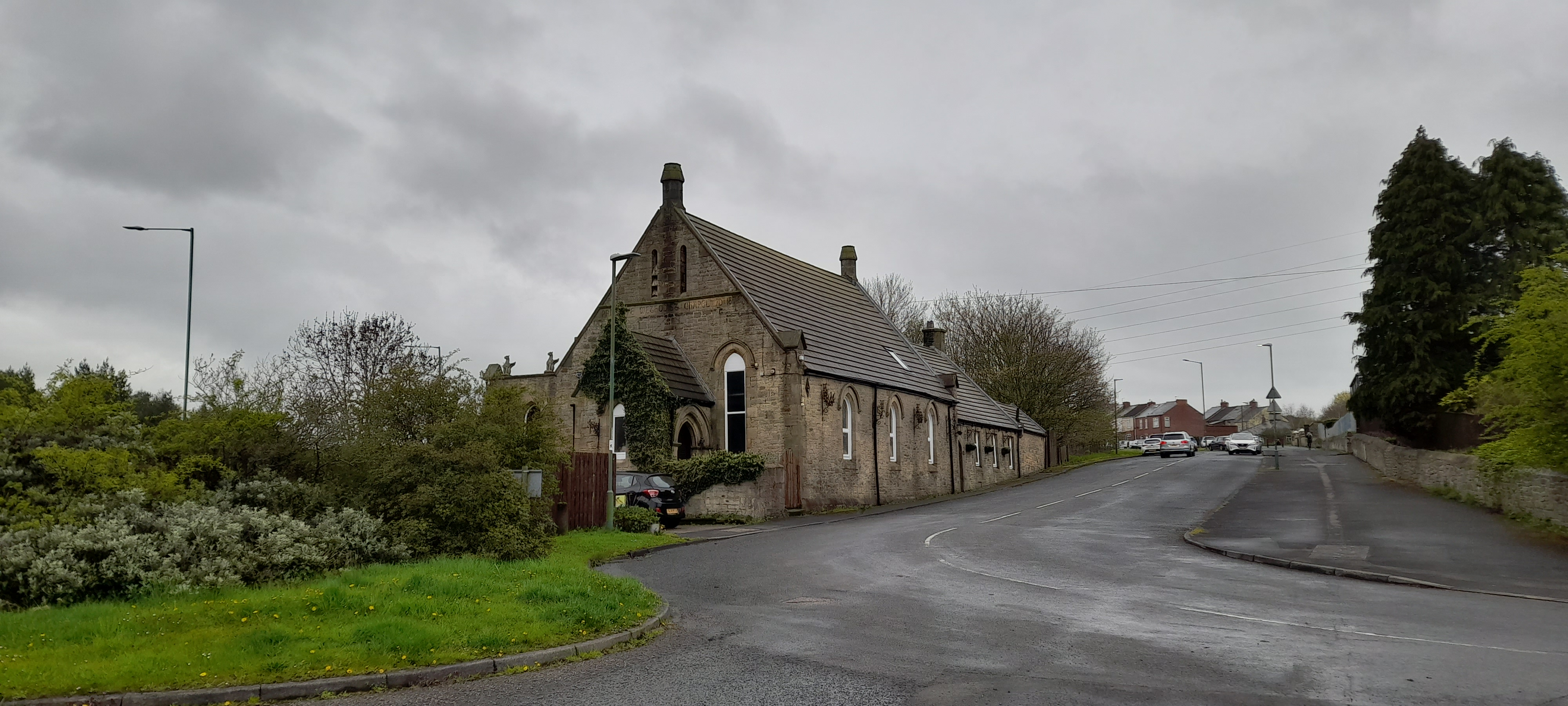
The former Oxhill Chapel, now a private house, opposite the Ox Inn.

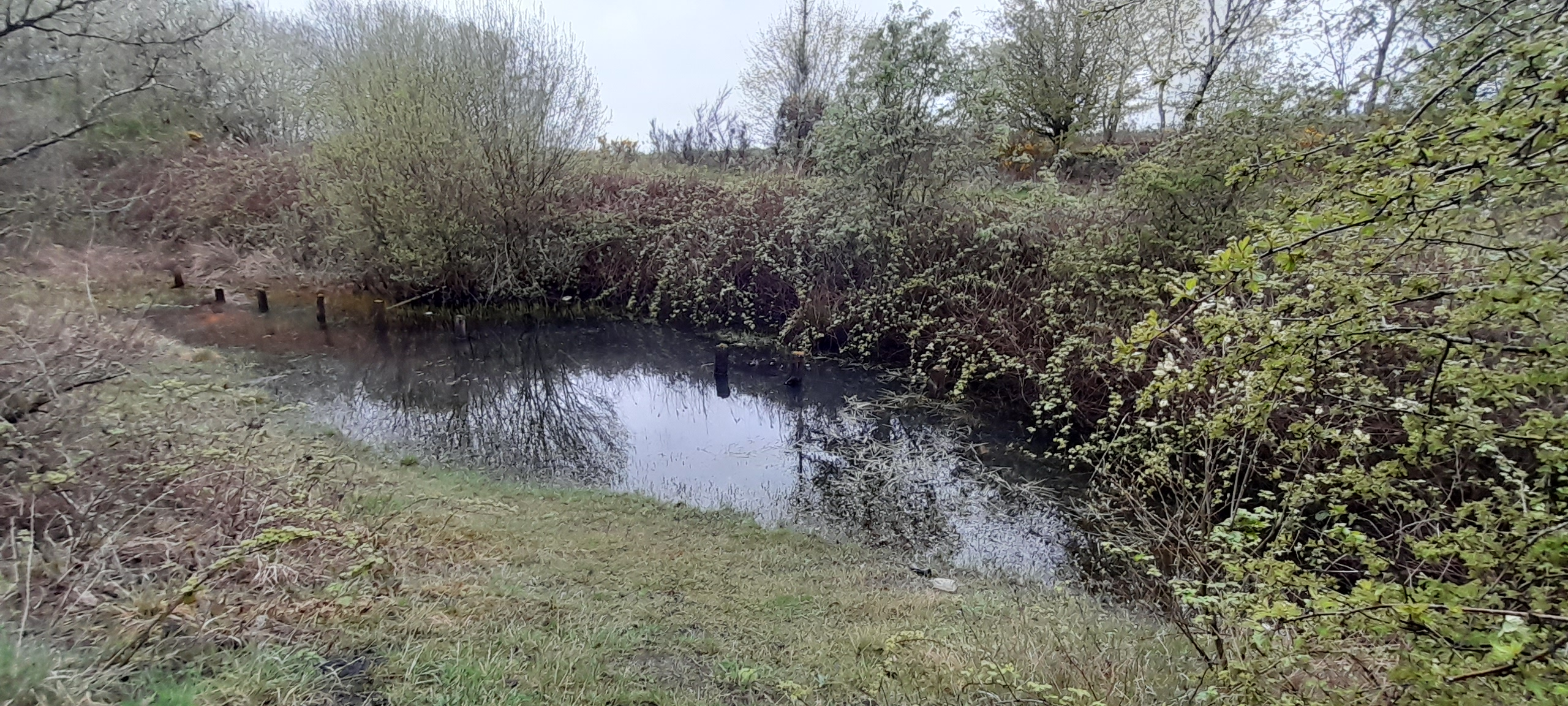
Kyo Ox Pond or Kyo Tarn, Oxhill, 400 m north of the Ox Inn.

Opposite the Ox Inn to the south west is the former Oxhill Chapel. This has now been converted to a private house.

Oxhill used to be the site of a major level crossing, allowing access from the former nearby Stanhope and Tyne Railway line (this is now the basis of the eastern section of the C2C cycle path) to a shunting yard adjacent to nearby South Moor, where coal was loaded for transport to the River Tyne for export.

A small pond called Kyo Ox Pond or Kyo Tarn, 400 metres to the north of The Ox pub on the road to East Kyo and Harperley, was artificially created between the embankment of the Stanhope and Tyne Railway and adjoining hillside when it was converted to the C2C cycle path in the late 1980s (there is an old railway bridge just to the east). The origins of this Cumbrian-sounding name are unknown, though it may have been named as such due to the nearby (and possibly older) Greencroft Tarn and Quarzi Tarn ponds (also known locally as Greencroft Fishing Pond and Quarzi Pond) in Greencroft.

== Notable people ==
Hillary Clinton's grandfather, Hugh Rodham, was born at Oxhill in 1879, the son of Jonathan Rodham, a coal miner living in the village. The family emigrated from here to the United States in the 1880s.

== Governance ==
On 30 September 1894 Oxhill became a civil parish, being formed from the part of Kyo in Stanley urban district, on 1 October 1916 the parish was abolished and merged with Stanley. In 1911 the parish had a population of 4436.
