= New Kyo =

Village in County Durham, England

Coordinates: 54.861°N 1.721°W

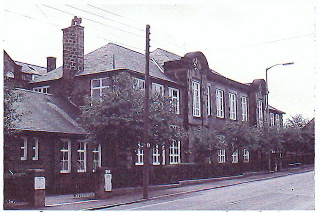
1994: Annfield Plain Intermediate School in New Kyo, later the lower school for Greencroft Comprehensive

New Kyo is a village in County Durham, in England. It is situated close to the A693 road between Annfield Plain and Stanley, and is slightly larger than nearby East Kyo to the north east and West Kyo, 15 minutes walk via public footpath to the north at the other side of the C2C cycle path. Oxhill is situated to the east on the way to Stanley.

Annfield Intermediate School was situated to the east end of New Kyo until the late 1990s, this being Greencroft Comprehensive Lower School from 1965 onwards (the first and second years were accommodated here before being transferred to Greencroft Comprehensive Upper School for the third year onwards to school leaving age) up to the late 1990s. After this, the lower and upper schools were merged and pupils were moved to Greencroft, now named just Greencroft School.

The current main landmark is the Monkey working men's club, hidden behind the fish and chip shop, at the far western end of New Kyo. This is on the boundary with Annfield Plain.

Kyo Pond is situated next to the C2C cycle path, almost halfway to West Kyo. It continues to exist despite a number of attempts to fill it in. Local landmark, The Bogs, exists beyond the C2C.

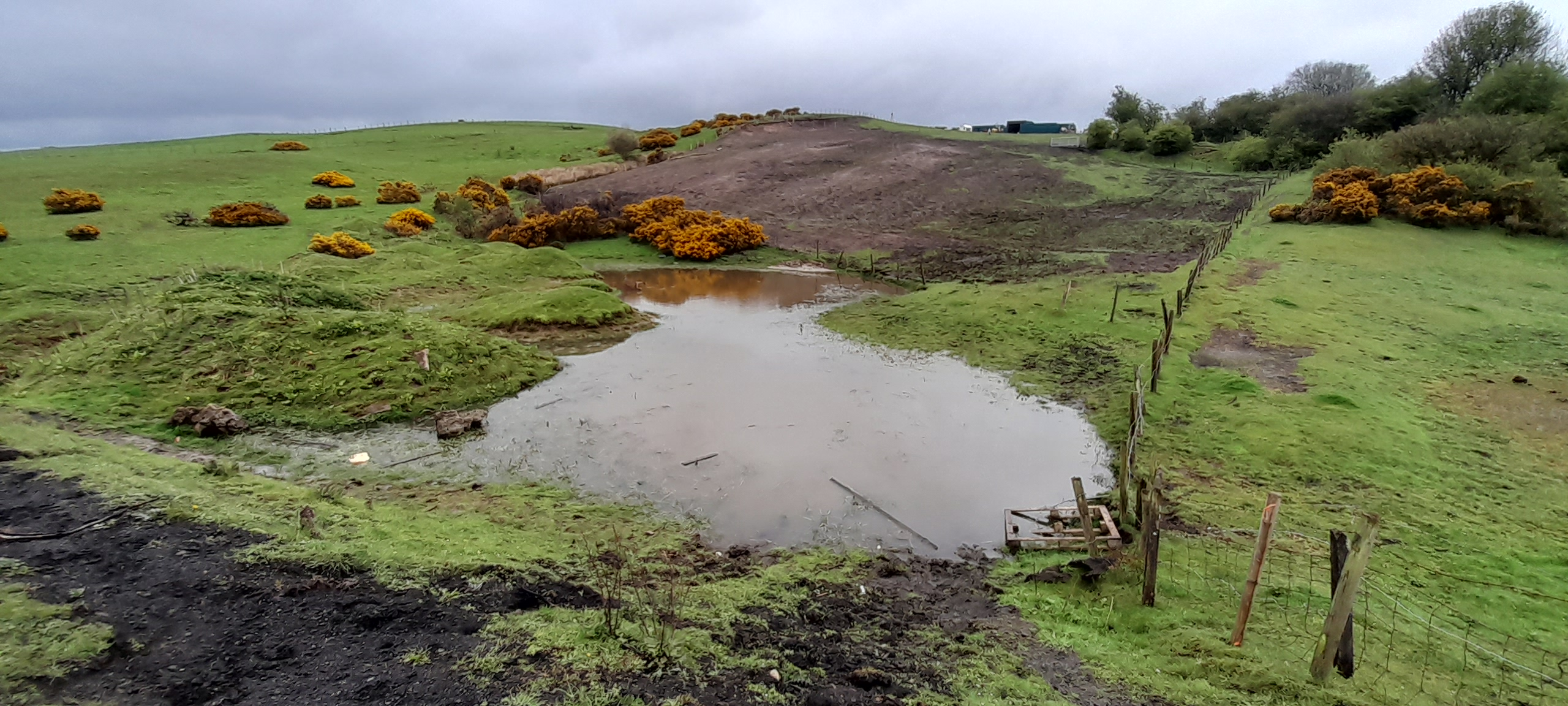
Kyo Pond adjacent to the C2C, not to be confused with Kyo Ox Pond or Kyo Tarn, 800 m to the east. The pond still exists despite several attempts to fill it in.
