= Lindong =

Lindong 林东镇 • ᠯᠢᠨᠳᠦ᠋ᠩ ᠪᠠᠯᠭᠠᠰᠤ
- Town
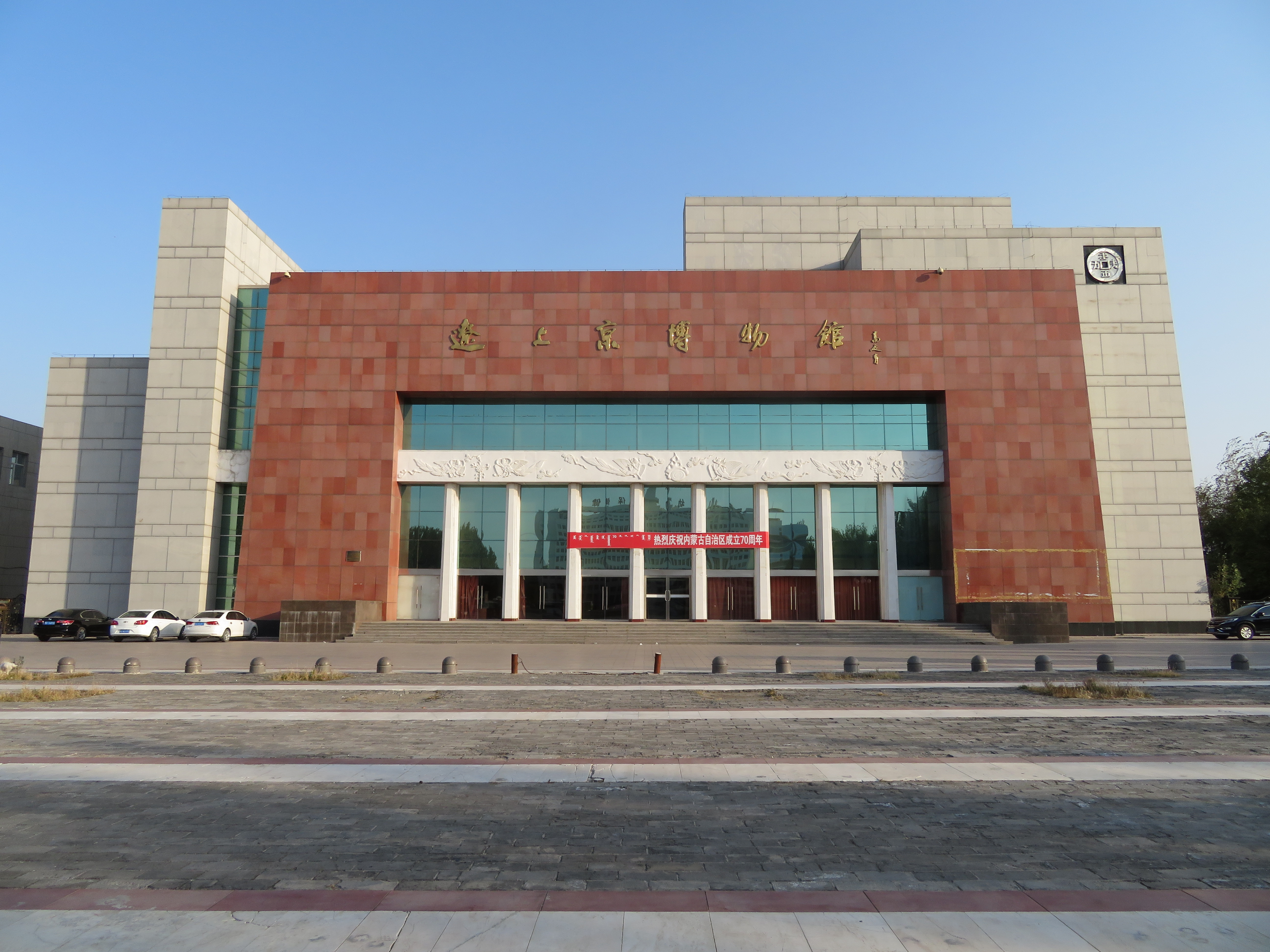
- Liao Shangjing Museum

- Location in Inner Mongolia
- Coordinates (Lindong town government): 43°58′05″N 119°22′32″E
- Country: People's Republic of China
- Autonomous region: Inner Mongolia
- Prefecture-level city: Chifeng
- Banner: Bairin Left Banner

Population (2018)
  - Total: 68,000
- Time zone: UTC+8 (China Standard)

Lindong (simplified Chinese: 林东镇; traditional Chinese: 林東鎮; pinyin: Líndōng Zhèn, Mongolian:ᠯᠢᠨᠳᠦ᠋ᠩ ᠪᠠᠯᠭᠠᠰᠤ) is a town in the Balin Left Banner, Chifeng, within the Inner Mongolia Autonomous Region of the People's Republic of China. The town has an area of 881 square kilometres (340 mi^{2}), and a population of 68,000, according to a 2020 publication by the Balin Left Banner government. The town serves as the administrative seat of the Balin Left Banner.

== Geography ==
Lindong lies adjacent to Balin Left Banner's urban core. Large swathes of the town are forests and grasslands.

=== Climate ===
The town has a continental climate, experiencing an average of 3,000 hours of sunshine annually, 166.4 millimetres (6.55 in) to 366.4 millimetres (14.43 in) of precipitation annually, and 120 to 130 frost-free days annually.

== Administrative divisions ==
Lindong is divided into 33 administrative villages (Chinese: 行政村; pinyin: xíngzhèng cūn). The town also hosts 125 natural villages (Chinese: 自然村; pinyin: zìrán cūn), which lack jurisdictional authority, and belong to the town's administrative villages. The towns administrative villages are as follows:

- Suobuliga Village (Chinese: 索布力嘎村)
- Fushandi Village (Chinese: 福山地村)
- Daxinzhuang Village (Chinese: 大新庄村)
- Xinglongdi Village (Chinese: 兴隆地村)
- Chaoyangyingzi Village (Chinese: 朝阳营子村)
- Chaidamu Village (Chinese: 柴达木村)
- Hantubai Village (Chinese: 罕吐柏村)
- Taiping Village (Chinese: 太平村)
- Panlonggang Village (Chinese: 蟠龙岗村)
- Shanwan Village (Chinese: 山湾村)
- Baolihantu Village (Chinese: 宝力罕吐村)
- Bayi Village (Chinese: 八一村)
- Xianfeng Village (Chinese: 先锋村)
- Hongweizhuang Village (Chinese: 红卫庄村)
- Jingzigou Village (Chinese: 井子沟村)
- Tulonggang Village (Chinese: 土龙岗村)
- Houxinglongdi Village (Chinese: 后兴隆地村)
- Longfenggou Village (Chinese: 龙凤沟村)
- Xinfangshen Village (Chinese: 新房身村)
- Gushanzi Village (Chinese: 孤山子村)
- Dongxinjing Village (Chinese: 东新井村)
- Yamenmiao Village (Chinese: 衙门庙村)
- Suobeishan Village (Chinese: 索贝山村)
- Shuiquangou Village (Chinese: 水泉沟村)
- Shisanhao Village (Chinese: 十三号村)
- Beijing Village (Chinese: 北井村)
- Mantou'aobao Village (Chinese: 馒头敖包村)
- Fushan Village (Chinese: 福山村)
- Baiyingou Village (Chinese: 白音沟村)
- Xinglongzhuang Village (Chinese: 兴隆庄村)
- Baiyingaoluo Village (Chinese: 白音高洛村)
- Taipingzhuang Village (Chinese: 太平庄村)
- Daolaomaodao Village (Chinese: 道劳毛道村)

== Demographics ==
Lindong has approximately 18,000 households, hosting a population of about 68,000 people, giving the town an average household size of 3.78 people. The town's population represents 19% of Balin Left Banner's total.

== Economy ==
According to the government of the Balin Left Banner, Lindong is a largely agricultural town. The largest industries in the town are vegetable farming, donkey husbandry, and broom production. The town has about 100 private enterprises, of which, 53 are identified by the banner government as small and medium enterprises.

=== Agriculture ===
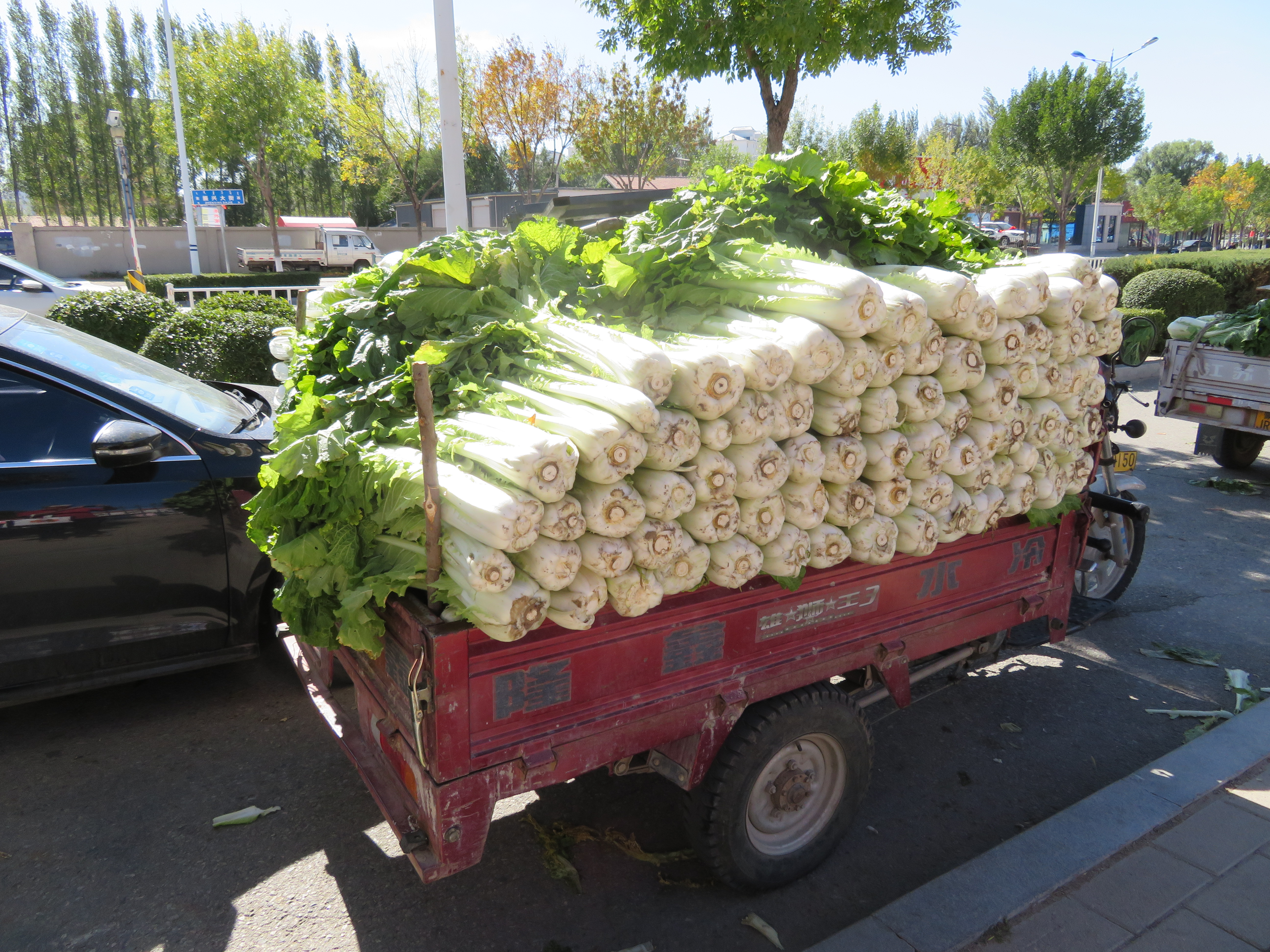
A vehicle carrying napa cabbage (Chinese: 大白菜; pinyin: dàbáicài) in Lindong

The per capita annual disposable income of the town's farmers and herders in 2019 totaled 12,521 renminbi.

As of 2019, the town raised approximately 190,000 heads of livestock, and grew 3,000 mu of vegetables.

There are six wholesale markets in Lindong.

=== Electricity generation ===
In order to promote economic growth, the banner government has launched a plan to expand agricultural facilities, construct a dam, and build a photovoltaic power plant within Lindong.

=== Tourism ===
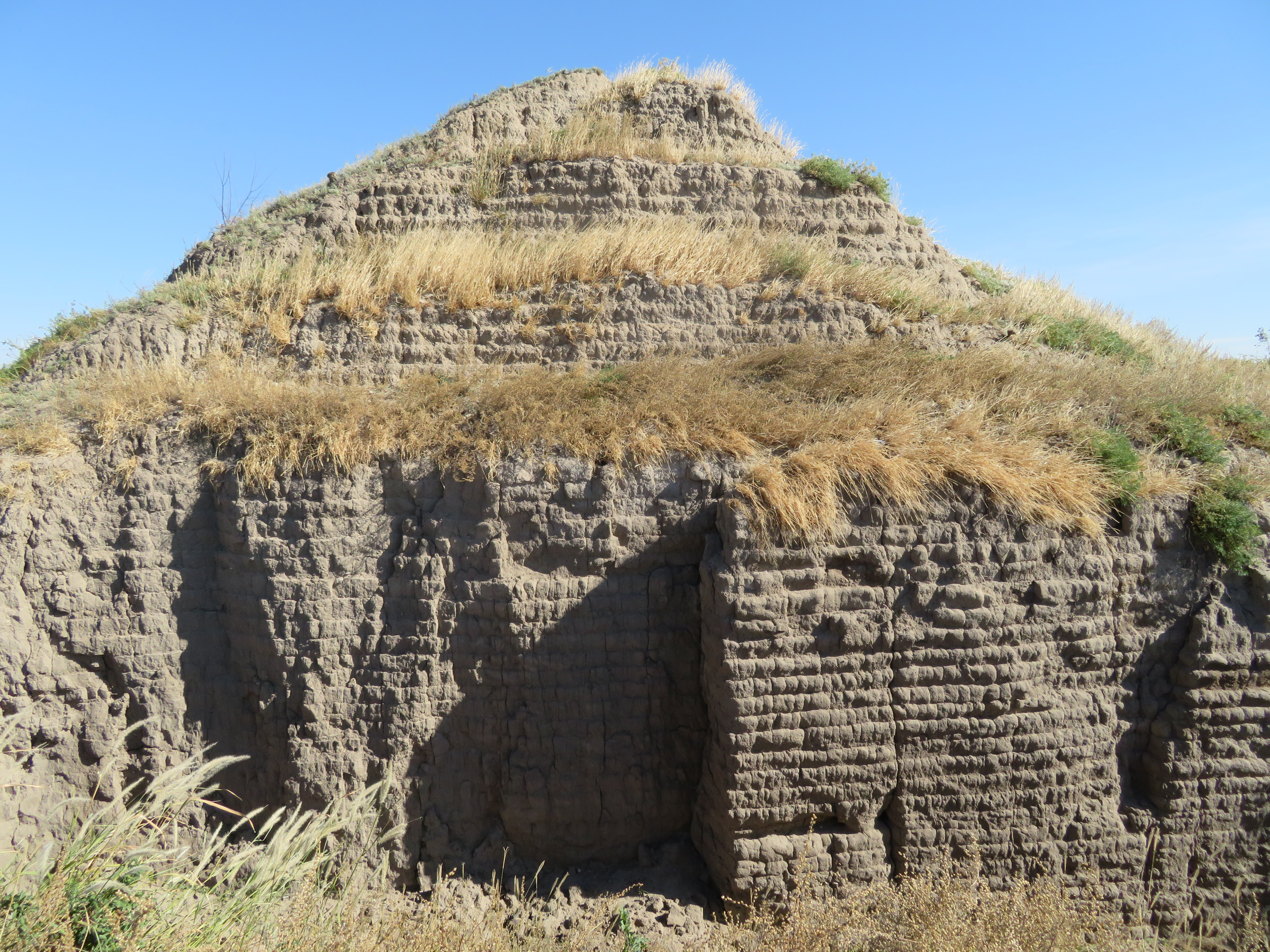
Rammed earth walls at the ruins of Shangjing

The town has a large tourism sector, as it is home to the ruins of Shangjing, an ancient city which served as the capital of the Liao dynasty. The Liao Shangjing Museum in the town, just west of the ruins of Shangjing, showcase 113,885 cultural relics, including many representative of the Khitan culture, the ethnic group the Liao dynasty was run by. The banner government also recognizes rural tourism as an important economic sector for Lindong.

== Transportation ==
National Highway 305 currently ends in the town, however, as of March 2020, the Banner government is working on a plan to extend it to the township of Xiahuofang. Multiple commercial bus providers service a route from Lindong to Beijing, which is approximately 780 kilometers in length.
