= Rose Hilton =

English painter (1931–2019)

- Hilton in her Penzance studio in 2006.
- Born: 15 August 1931
- Died: 19 March 2019 (aged 87)
- Known for: Painting
- Spouse: Roger Hilton

Rose Hilton, née Phipps (15 August 1931 – 19 March 2019) was a British painter living in Cornwall. Her husband said that he would be the only artist in their relationship, but she achieved recognition after he died.

== Life ==
Hilton was born in Kent, in 1931 into a very religious family. There was not much art in her house but she cherished the religious illustrations that she saw. Her parents did not want her to be an artist but training in art to be a teacher was allowed. She attended the Royal College of Art in London but her parents insisted that she travel home each night to avoid the life in London. She and Bridget Riley were two of the leading students, both gaining first class degrees. She won the Life Drawing and Painting prize as well as the Abbey Minor Scholarship to Rome.

Upon her return to London, she began teaching art, and, in the late 1950s met her future husband, the leading abstract artist Roger Hilton. Roger actively discouraged his wife’s artistic endeavours, but following his death in 1975 she took up her brushes again. In 1977 she had her first solo show at Newlyn Art Gallery, and her Post-Impressionist, figurative paintings have achieved wide popularity. Her work is often compared to that of the French Nabi painter, Pierre Bonnard and is noticeably influenced by that of Henri Matisse.

In 2008, a retrospective of Rose Hilton's work was held at Tate St Ives.
