= Bairin Left Banner =

Bairin Left Banner 巴林左旗 • ᠪᠠᠭᠠᠷᠢᠨ ᠵᠡᠭᠦᠨ ᠬᠣᠰᠢᠭᠤ
- Banner
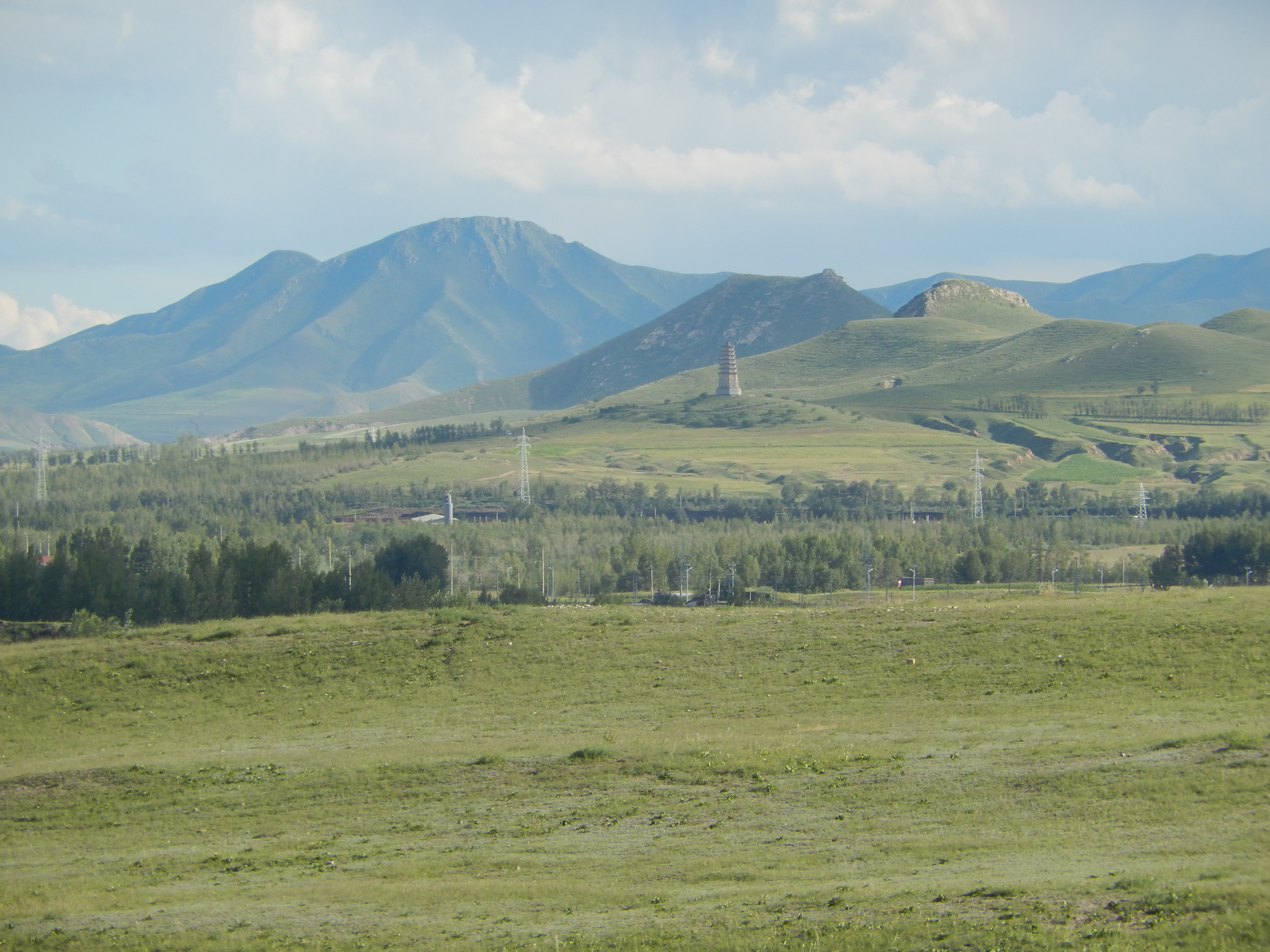
- Lindong South Pagoda from the ruins of Shangjing

- Location in Inner Mongolia Bairin Left (China)
- Coordinates (Bairin Left Banner government): 43°57′39″N 119°21′48″E
- Country: China
- Autonomous region: Inner Mongolia
- Prefecture-level city: Chifeng
- Banner seat: Lindong

Area
  - Total: 6,644 km^{2} (2,565 sq mi)
- Elevation: 484 m (1,588 ft)

Population (2020)
  - Total: 277,522
  - Density: 41.77/km^{2} (108.2/sq mi)
- Time zone: UTC+8 (China Standard)
- Postal code: 025450
- Area code: 0476
- Website: www.blzq.gov.cn

Bairin Left Banner

Chinese name
- Chinese: 巴林左旗
Transcriptions
Standard Mandarin
- Hanyu Pinyin: Bālín Zuǒ Qí

Mongolian name
- Mongolian Cyrillic: Бааарин зүүн хошуу
- Mongolian script: ᠪᠠᠭᠠᠷᠢᠨ ᠵᠡᠭᠦᠨ ᠬᠣᠰᠢᠭᠤ
Transcriptions
- SASM/GNC: Baɣarin Jegün qosiɣu

Baarin Left Banner (Mongolian: ᠪᠠᠭᠠᠷᠢᠨ ᠵᠡᠭᠦᠨ ᠬᠣᠰᠢᠭᠤ; Chinese: 巴林左旗), or Bairin, is a banner of eastern Inner Mongolia, China, under the administration of the prefecture-level city of Chifeng. The banner spans an area of 6,644 square kilometers, and as of 2018, has a population of 340,020. Baarin Mongols live here. The distinct Mongolian dialect of this region is called Baarin. It is located at the intersection of two national highways: China National Highway 303 and 305.

== History ==
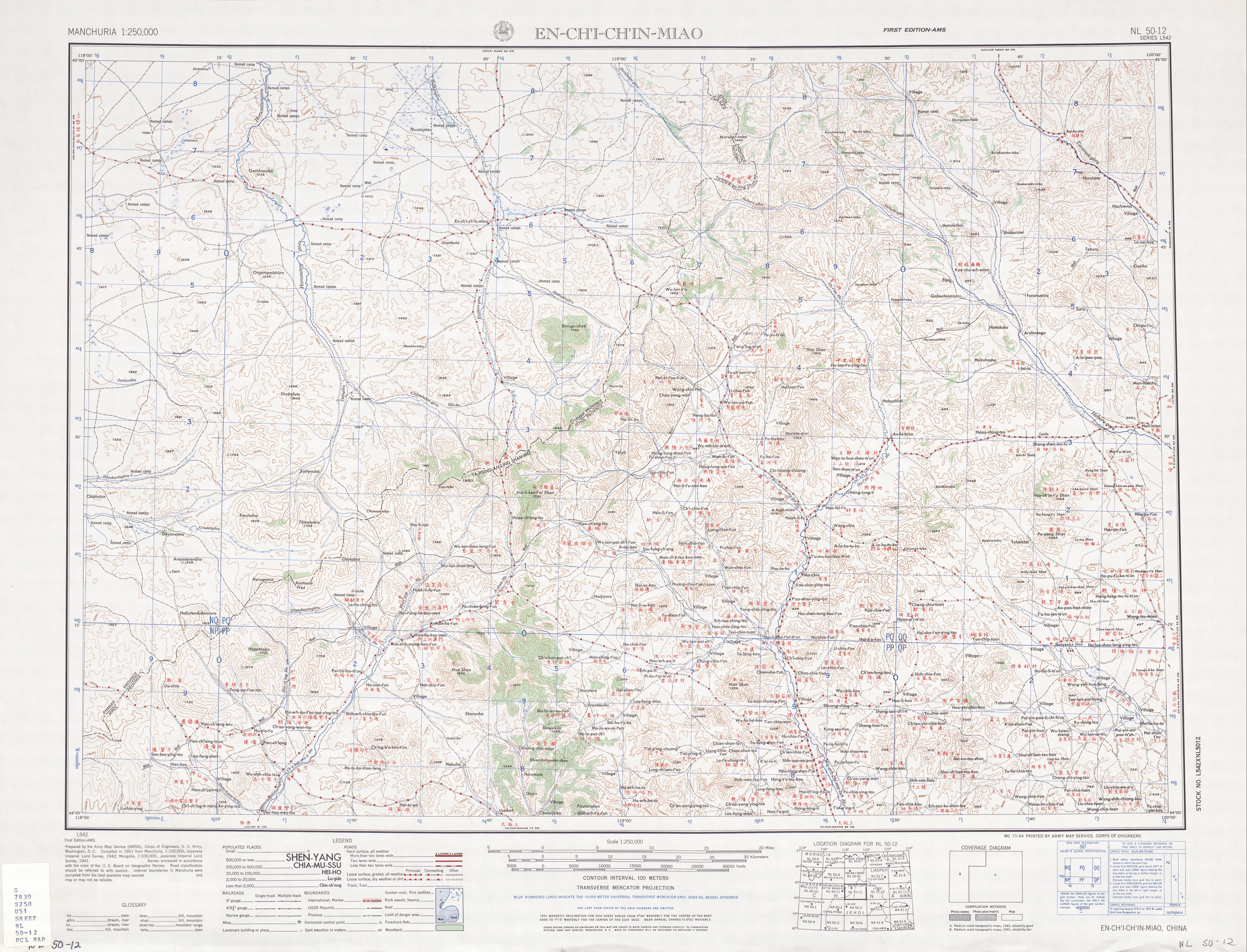
Map including part of modern-day Bairin Left Banner area (AMS, 1951)

Balin Left Banner has a long history, with archaeological digs dating to the 40th Century BC. Archaeological relics uncovered in the banner are believed to include those of the Hongshan culture and the Fuhe culture.

Around the time China was undergoing the Warring States period, the area of Bairin Left Banner was home to the Shanrong and Donghu people. Later, the area would be home to the Wuhuan and the Xianbei.

During the first few centuries of the Common Era, the area was home to the Khitan people and the Kumo Xi.

In 918 CE, the capital of the Khitan-led Liao dynasty, Shangjing (Chinese: 上京), was built in present-day Bairin Left Banner. From 918 CE to 938 it was known as Huangdu (皇都).

During the time of the Republic of China, many Han Chinese began moving to the area.

On March 1, 1933, the banner, then known as Lindong County (林东县; 林東縣), was invaded by Japanese forces, who occupied the county until August 10, 1945.

On June 1, 1946, the Chinese Communist Party established its local government in the area, the Lindong Administrative Committee (林东行政委员会; 林東行政委員會).

From the establishment of the People's Republic of China throughout the early 1980s, the area underwent numerous administrative reorganizations, culminating in October 1983, with the placement of the Bairin Left Banner under the prefecture-level city of Chifeng.

== Climate ==
Baarin Left Banner has a continental, semi-arid climate (Köppen BSk), with very cold and dry winters, hot, somewhat humid summers, and strong winds, especially in spring. The monthly 24-hour average temperature ranges from −13.1 °C (8.4 °F) in January to 22.8 °C (73.0 °F) in July, with the annual mean at 5.89 °C (42.6 °F). The annual precipitation is approximately 370 millimetres (14.6 in), with more than half of it falling in July and August alone. Due to the aridity and elevation, diurnal temperature variation often exceeds 15 °C (27 °F) in spring, averaging 13.7 °C (24.7 °F) annually. There are 2,934 hours of bright sunshine annually, with each of the winter months having over 70% of the possible total, and this percentage falling to 52 in July.

Climate data for Bairin Left Banner, elevation 486 m (1,594 ft), (1991–2020 normals, extremes 1951–2010)
Month	Jan	Feb	Mar	Apr	May	Jun	Jul	Aug	Sep	Oct	Nov	Dec	Year
Record high °C (°F)	9.5 (49.1)	18.7 (65.7)	28.7 (83.7)	33.4 (92.1)	39.1 (102.4)	39.9 (103.8)	38.0 (100.4)	38.8 (101.8)	36.0 (96.8)	30.7 (87.3)	22.5 (72.5)	12.0 (53.6)	39.9 (103.8)
Mean daily maximum °C (°F)	−6.0 (21.2)	−1.2 (29.8)	6.0 (42.8)	15.9 (60.6)	23.4 (74.1)	27.4 (81.3)	29.2 (84.6)	28.1 (82.6)	23.0 (73.4)	14.5 (58.1)	3.1 (37.6)	−4.4 (24.1)	13.3 (55.9)
Daily mean °C (°F)	−12.7 (9.1)	−8.6 (16.5)	−1.1 (30.0)	8.6 (47.5)	16.4 (61.5)	21.1 (70.0)	23.5 (74.3)	21.6 (70.9)	15.3 (59.5)	7.0 (44.6)	−3.7 (25.3)	−10.9 (12.4)	6.4 (43.5)
Mean daily minimum °C (°F)	−18.4 (−1.1)	−15.2 (4.6)	−8.2 (17.2)	1.0 (33.8)	8.7 (47.7)	14.4 (57.9)	17.8 (64.0)	15.3 (59.5)	7.9 (46.2)	0.2 (32.4)	−9.4 (15.1)	−16.3 (2.7)	−0.2 (31.7)
Record low °C (°F)	−32.2 (−26.0)	−31.2 (−24.2)	−30.9 (−23.6)	−14.9 (5.2)	−4.8 (23.4)	2.4 (36.3)	6.2 (43.2)	5.4 (41.7)	−6.1 (21.0)	−12.7 (9.1)	−30.9 (−23.6)	−28.8 (−19.8)	−32.2 (−26.0)
Average precipitation mm (inches)	1.0 (0.04)	1.4 (0.06)	4.0 (0.16)	10.9 (0.43)	26.0 (1.02)	81.5 (3.21)	122.5 (4.82)	71.4 (2.81)	29.7 (1.17)	13.0 (0.51)	3.8 (0.15)	1.1 (0.04)	366.3 (14.42)
Average precipitation days (≥ 0.1 mm)	1.6	1.4	2.5	3.9	6.8	12.3	12.4	9.7	6.9	3.7	2.1	1.8	65.1
Average snowy days	2.2	2.3	3.5	1.9	0.1	0	0	0	0	1.2	3.1	2.6	16.9
Average relative humidity (%)	48	42	38	34	38	55	66	66	58	48	50	50	49
Mean monthly sunshine hours	222.6	237.7	282.0	282.1	300.6	269.4	267.3	281.2	268.8	255.2	212.4	205.1	3,084.4
Percentage possible sunshine	77	80	76	70	66	58	58	66	73	76	74	75	71
Source: China Meteorological Administration

Climate data for Fuhe Town, Bairin Left Banner, elevation 710 m (2,330 ft), (1991–2020 normals)
Month	Jan	Feb	Mar	Apr	May	Jun	Jul	Aug	Sep	Oct	Nov	Dec	Year
Mean daily maximum °C (°F)	−8.5 (16.7)	−3.9 (25.0)	3.7 (38.7)	13.8 (56.8)	21.5 (70.7)	25.8 (78.4)	27.7 (81.9)	26.4 (79.5)	21.5 (70.7)	12.7 (54.9)	1.2 (34.2)	−6.9 (19.6)	11.2 (52.3)
Daily mean °C (°F)	−14.1 (6.6)	−10.5 (13.1)	−3.2 (26.2)	6.4 (43.5)	14.3 (57.7)	19.3 (66.7)	21.6 (70.9)	19.5 (67.1)	13.5 (56.3)	5.1 (41.2)	−5.2 (22.6)	−12.4 (9.7)	4.5 (40.1)
Mean daily minimum °C (°F)	−18.5 (−1.3)	−15.9 (3.4)	−9.6 (14.7)	−1.0 (30.2)	6.6 (43.9)	12.5 (54.5)	15.7 (60.3)	13.3 (55.9)	6.4 (43.5)	−1.2 (29.8)	−10.3 (13.5)	−16.8 (1.8)	−1.6 (29.2)
Average precipitation mm (inches)	0.6 (0.02)	1.7 (0.07)	3.3 (0.13)	9.7 (0.38)	34.2 (1.35)	80.8 (3.18)	113.9 (4.48)	74.9 (2.95)	33.0 (1.30)	12.9 (0.51)	4.4 (0.17)	1.4 (0.06)	370.8 (14.6)
Average precipitation days (≥ 0.1 mm)	1.3	1.6	3.0	4.4	7.7	13.3	14.7	11.0	7.3	4.0	2.7	2.0	73
Average snowy days	3.3	3.7	5.5	3.8	0.2	0	0	0	0.2	2.9	4.7	4.8	29.1
Average relative humidity (%)	54	50	45	38	41	57	69	70	59	50	54	57	54
Mean monthly sunshine hours	213.7	227.1	274.3	275.7	292.9	270.9	265.3	280.0	256.7	246.9	203.6	190.9	2,998
Percentage possible sunshine	74	76	74	68	64	59	57	65	69	74	72	70	69
Source: China Meteorological Administration

== Administrative divisions ==
Bairin Left Banner is divided into 2 subdistricts, 7 towns, 2 townships and 2 sums. The banner's seat of government is the town of Lindong.

Name	Simplified Chinese	Hanyu Pinyin	Mongolian (Hudum Script)	Mongolian (Cyrillic)	Administrative division code
Subdistricts
Lindong Xicheng Subdistrict	林东西城街道	Líndōng Xīchéng Jiēdào	ᠯᠢᠨᠳ᠋ᠦ᠋ᠩ ᠦᠨ ᠪᠠᠷᠠᠭᠤᠨ ᠬᠣᠲᠠ ᠶᠢᠨ ᠵᠡᠭᠡᠯᠢ ᠭᠤᠳᠤᠮᠵᠢ	Линдонгийн баруун хотын зээл гудамж	150422403
Lindong Dongcheng Subdistrict	林东东城街道	Líndōng Dōngchéng Jiēdào	ᠯᠢᠨᠳ᠋ᠦ᠋ᠩ ᠤᠨ ᠵᠡᠭᠦᠨ ᠬᠣᠲᠠ ᠶᠢᠨ ᠵᠡᠭᠡᠯᠢ ᠭᠤᠳᠤᠮᠵᠢ	Линдонгийн зүүн хотын зээл гудамж	150422404
Towns
Lindong	林东镇	Líndōng Zhèn	ᠯᠢᠨᠳᠦ᠋ᠩ ᠪᠠᠯᠭᠠᠰᠤ	Линдон балгас	150422100
Longchang	隆昌镇	Lóngchāng Zhèn	ᠯᠦᠩᠴᠠᠩ ᠪᠠᠯᠭᠠᠰᠤ	Лүнцан балгас	150422101
Shisan Obo	十三敖包镇	Shísān'áobāo Zhèn	ᠠᠷᠪᠠᠨ ᠭᠤᠷᠪᠠᠨ ᠣᠪᠣᠭ᠎ᠠ ᠪᠠᠯᠭᠠᠰᠤ	Арван гурван овоо балгас	150422102
Biliutai	碧流台镇	Bìliútái Zhèn	ᠪᠢᠯᠡᠭᠦᠲᠠᠢ ᠪᠠᠯᠭᠠᠰᠤ	Билүүтэй балгас	150422103
Fuhe	富河镇	Fùhé Zhèn	ᠹᠦ᠋ ᠾᠧ ᠪᠠᠯᠭᠠᠰᠤ	Фү ге балгас	150422104
Bayan Ul	白音勿拉镇	Báiyīnwùlā Zhèn	ᠪᠠᠶᠠᠨ ᠠᠭᠤᠯᠠ ᠪᠠᠯᠭᠠᠰᠤ	Баянуул балгас	150422105
Har Had	哈拉哈达镇	Hālāhādá Zhèn	ᠬᠠᠷᠠᠬᠠᠳᠠ ᠪᠠᠯᠭᠠᠰᠤ	Хархад балгас	150422106
Townships
Sanshan Township	三山乡	Sānshān Xiāng	ᠰᠠᠨ ᠱᠠᠨ ᠰᠢᠶᠠᠩ	Сан шин шиян	150422202
Hua Jalag Township	花加拉嘎乡	Huājiālāgā Xiāng	ᠬᠤᠸᠠᠵᠢᠯᠠᠭ᠎ᠠ ᠰᠢᠶᠠᠩ	Хуажлаа шиян	150422203
Sums
Qagan Had Sum	查干哈达苏木	Chágànhādá Sūmù	ᠴᠠᠭᠠᠨᠬᠠᠳᠠ ᠰᠤᠮᠤ	Цагаанхад сум	150422200
Ulan Daba Sum	乌兰达坝苏木	Wūlándábà Sūmù	ᠤᠯᠠᠭᠠᠨᠳᠠᠪᠠᠭ᠎ᠠ ᠰᠤᠮᠤ	Улаандаваа сум	150422201
Other Township-level Divisions
Lindong Industrial Park	林东产业园	Líndōng Chǎnyè Yuán			150422405

== Demographics ==
Bairin Left Banner ethnic composition (2020)
Nationality	Percentage
Han	61.4%
Mongols	35.3%
Manchus	2.9%
Hui people	0.2%
Others	0.2%
