= Nanjing incident of 1616 =

The Nanjing incident of 1616, or the Nanjing Church incident (Chinese: 南京教案), was a set-back for Christianity in China after the initial success of Matteo Ricci and other members of the Jesuit China mission to use western science and technology to integrate themselves into the Ming Dynasty bureaucracy and scholarly culture.

The incident was instigated by the vice-minister and the acting Minister of Rites, with the support of others throughout the bureaucracy. Members of the Jesuit mission, who had become less accommodating towards traditional Chinese rituals since the death of Ricci in 1610, were put on trial for their actions in the dual capitals Beijing and Nanjing. Of the twelve missionaries in China at the time (all Jesuit), four were banished to Macao, and the remaining eight retired from public life and ceased publication of religious and scientific works until 1622.

== See also ==
- Jesuit China missions
- Chinese Rites controversy
