= Henan Prefecture =

Historical administrative division of China

- Simplified Chinese: 河南府
- Hanyu Pinyin: Hénán Fǔ
- Location of Henan Prefecture in Henan Province (1820)
- Population
  - 740s or 750s: 1,183,092
  - 1100s: 233,280
- History
  - Preceded by: Henan Commandery a.k.a. Luo Zhou
  - Created: 713 (Tang dynasty)
  - Abolished: 1913 (Republic of China)
  - Succeeded by: Heluo Circuit

Henanfu or Henan Prefecture, also known as Luoyang, was a fu (superior prefecture) in imperial China in modern Henan, China, centering on modern Luoyang. It existed (intermittently) from 713 to 1913. During the Later Tang dynasty (923–937) it was the national capital. For most of the Tang dynasty (before 907) it was known as the "Eastern Capital" (東都), and during the Northern Song dynasty (960–1127) it was known as the "Western Capital" (西京). From 1127 to 1234 the Jurchen conquerors named it Jinchang Prefecture (金昌府), also known as "Central Capital" (中京). For these reasons, Henan Prefecture was also colloquially called Luojing (洛京, "Luo Capital").

The modern province Henan retains its name.
