= Bairin Park =

Park in Gifu, Gifu Prefecture, Japan

Coordinates: 35°25′6.1″N 136°46′14.1″E

- Interactive map of Bairin Park
- Location: Gifu, Gifu Prefecture, Japan

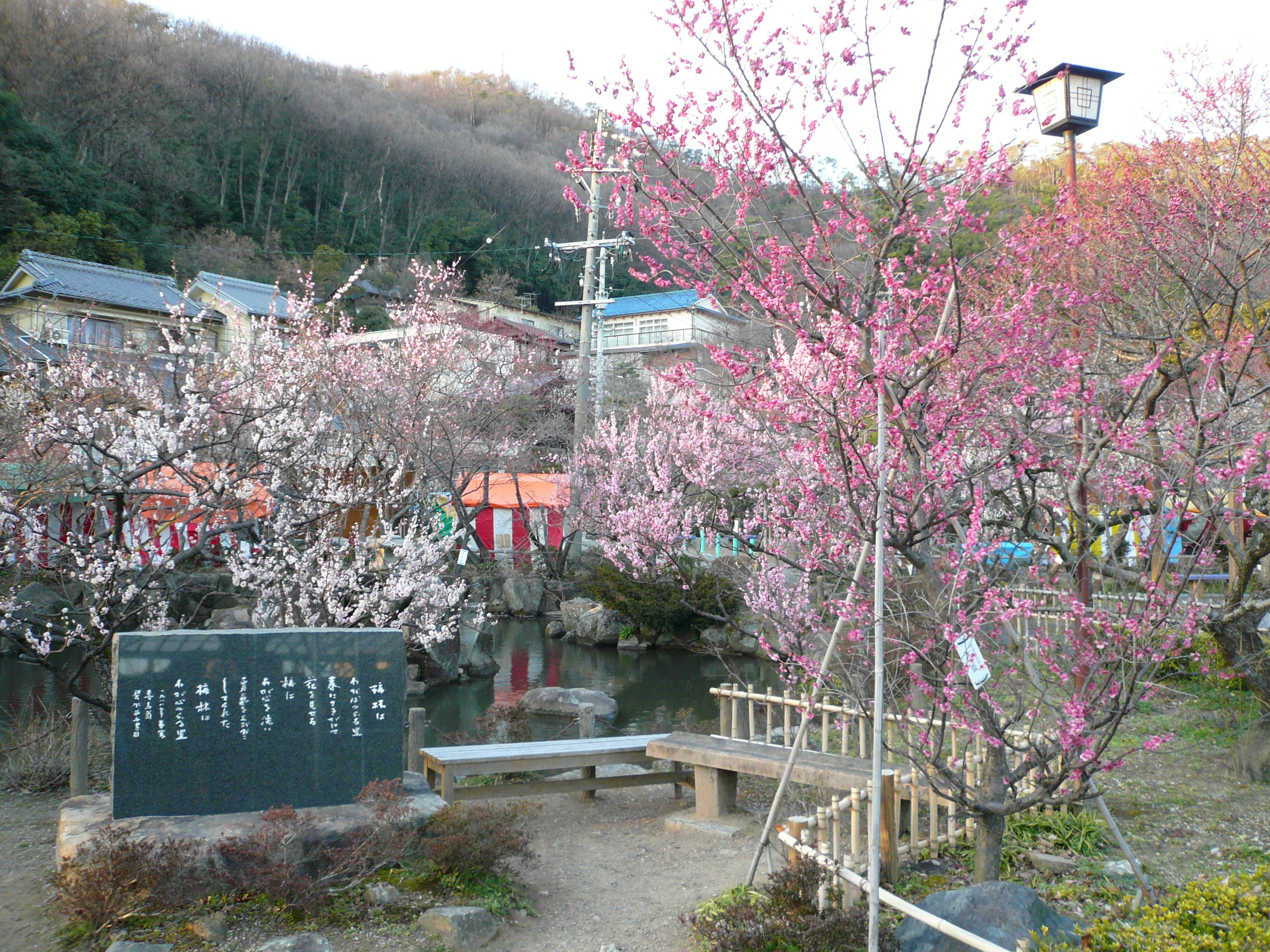
Bairin Park

Bairin Park (梅林公園, Bairin Koen) is a city-supported park located in Gifu, Gifu Prefecture, Japan. In Bairin Park, there are a total of approximately 1,300 plum trees, which represent approximately 50 different varieties.

== History ==
The park was originally opened in 1872 as the private Sasagatani Park. It received its name, which means "plum grove," when it was opened to the public a few years later. In 1948, ownership of the park was transferred to the city of Gifu, leading to its current state.

== Plum Trees ==
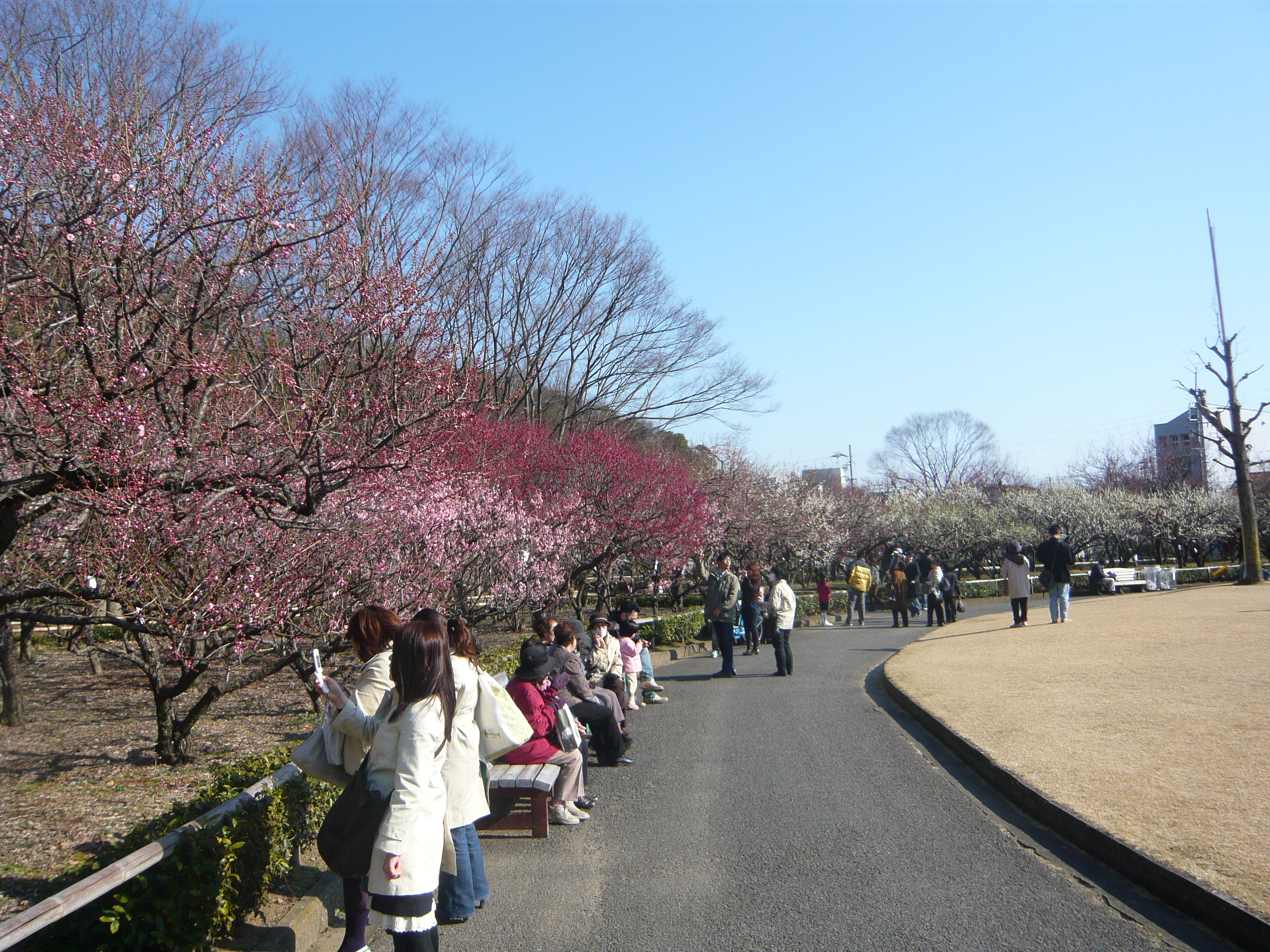
Gifu Plum Blossom Festival 2008

Of the 1,300 trees, about 700 have white blossoms and 600 have red blossoms. The earliest plum trees beginning blooming in mid-January, with the majority of the blooming occurring in February and March. The best viewing time is in early March, when most of the plum trees are in bloom. On the first Saturday and Sunday of March, the annual Gifu Plum Festival is held in the Park. No other trees are grown inside the park's plum groves, giving visitors and unadulterated view of plum blossoms in Spring.

== Point of Interest ==
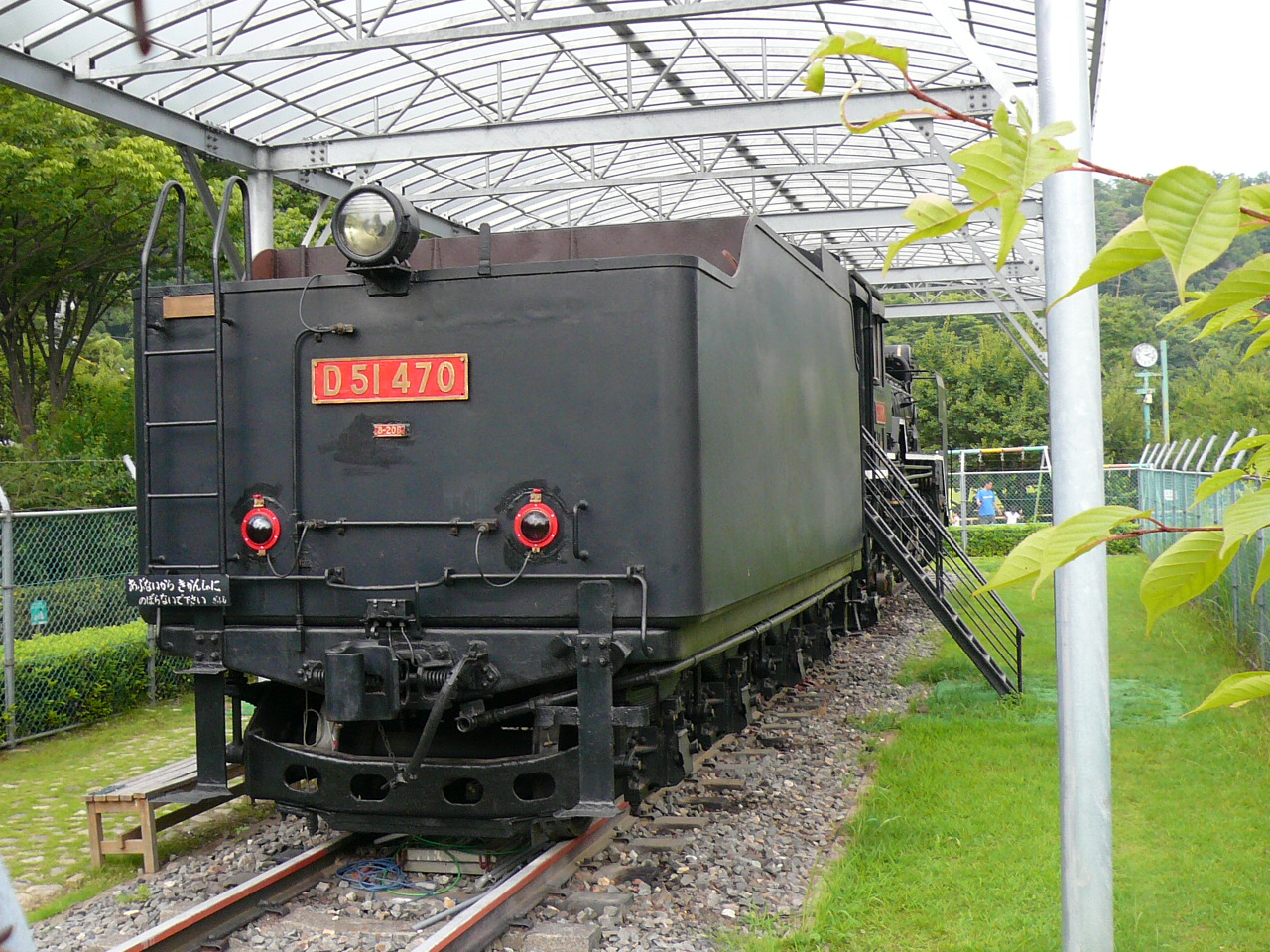
D51 Steam Locomotive in Bairin Park

Bairin Park is home to a D51 steam locomotive, which were built in Japan around the time of the Pacific War.
