= Harperley =

Hamlet in County Durham, England

Coordinates: 54.876°N 1.729°W

- Harperley Hotel

- Location within County Durham
- OS grid reference: NZ175535
- Civil parish: Stanley
- Unitary authority: County Durham
- Ceremonial county: Durham
- Region: North East
- Country: England
- Sovereign state: United Kingdom
- Post town: DURHAM
- Postcode district: DH9
- Police: Durham
- Fire: County Durham and Darlington
- Ambulance: North East

Harperley is a hamlet in the civil parish of Stanley, in County Durham, England. It is situated between Tantobie to the north east, Tanfield Lea to the east, Stanley to the south, East Kyo to the south east and Catchgate, West Kyo and Annfield Plain to the west.

Harperley consists of two parts; the southern part (consisting of seven houses) is set around crossroads from which there is easy access to West Kyo, Catchgate, Annfield Plain and Stanley. The northern part (consisting of three houses and a farm) is grouped around the now derelict Harperley Hotel, a now closed public house formerly known locally for meals and hosting wedding functions. Due to local council ownership in the 1970s, it allegedly gained the nickname Ratepayer's Arms.

The grounds surrounding the Harperley Hotel used to be the site of a zoo (in the 1960s) and a children's playground (as late as the mid 1990s). A local stream called the Kyo Burn flows through the grounds, which lower down its course is known as Beamish Burn and later the River Team before it flows into the River Tyne.

Harperley Pond sits 100 metres (330 ft) east of the former hotel. Mallard ducks, moorhens and the occasional heron have been observed here.

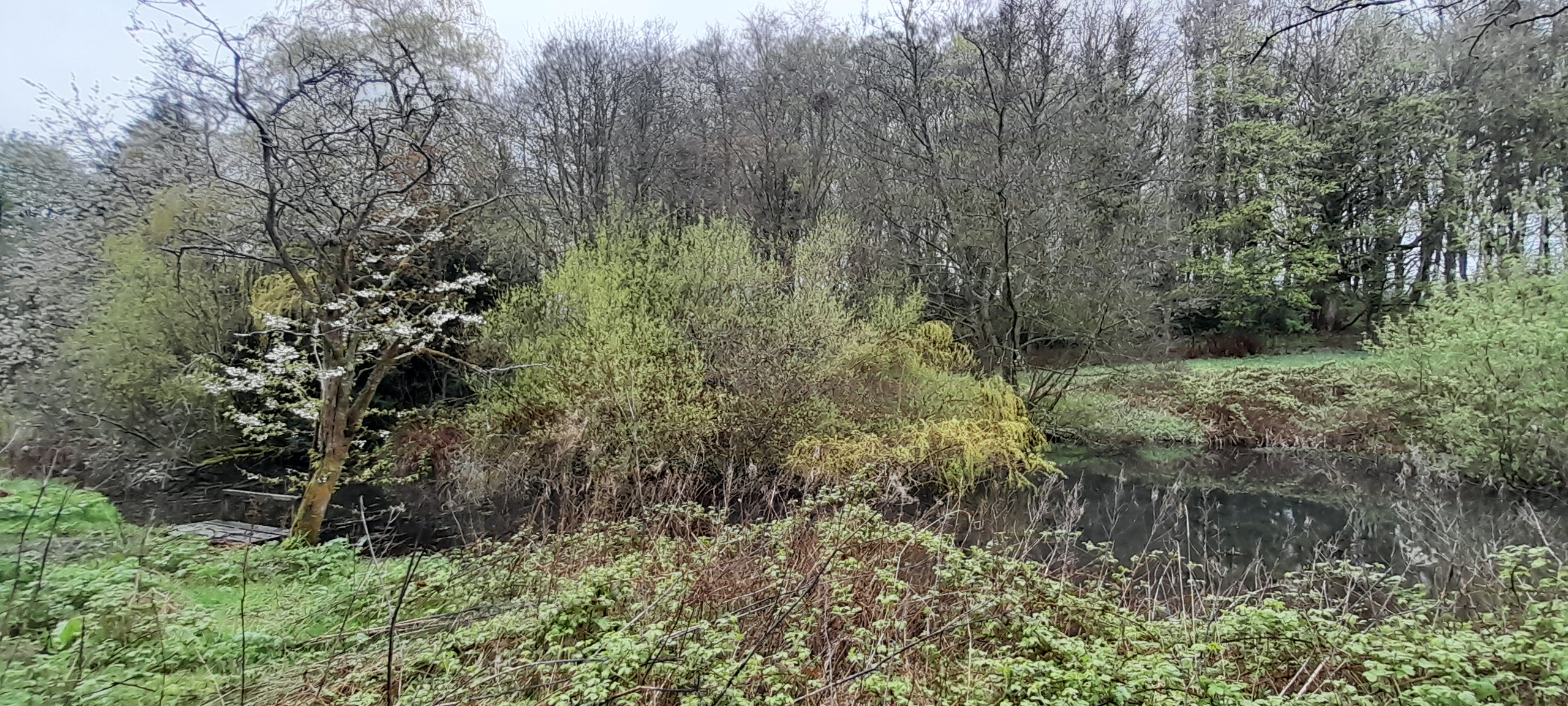
Harperley Pond, east of the former Harperley Hotel

== Weardale Railway ==
There is another Harperley, which was once served by a railway station, located on what's now preserved as the Weardale Railway. Harperley Station closed in 1953, though the line however, continued as a freight-only railway line until 1993, when the line became mothballed following the transfer of freight to road-haulage.

However, even though the station site is still extant, the Weardale Railway passes Harperley en route between Witton-le-Wear and Wolsingham.

The village itself, is in fact located further north from the site of the station.
