= Western Capital =

Chinese name
- Chinese: 西京
Transcriptions
Standard Mandarin
- Hanyu Pinyin: Xījīng
- Bopomofo: ㄒㄧ ㄐㄧㄥ
Yue: Cantonese
- Jyutping: sai1 ging1

Vietnamese name
- Vietnamese alphabet: Tây Kinh
- Chữ Hán: 西京

Korean name
- Hangul: 서경
- Hanja: 西京
Transcriptions
- Revised Romanization: Seogyeong
- McCune–Reischauer: Sŏgyŏng

Japanese name
- Kanji: 西京
- Kana: さいきょう さいけい
Transcriptions
- Romanization: Saikyō; Saikei

Western Capital may refer to:

== China ==
- The former name of Xi'an, called Xijing during the Han, Sui and Tang dynasties
- The former name of Luoyang, called Xijing during the Later Jin of the Five Dynasties period
- The former name of Datong, called Xijing during the (Khitan) Liao and (Jurchen) Jin dynasties
- The former name of Lingwu
- The former name of Fengxiang
- The former name of Linjiang
- The former name of Chengdu, called Xijing by a short-lived successor state to the Ming

== Japan ==
- Another name of Yamaguchi, Yamaguchi, by contrast with Kyoto "Capital"
- Another name of Kyoto, by contrast with Tokyo "Eastern capital"
- Nishikyō-ku, Kyoto, a ward located in western Kyoto

== Korean peninsula ==
- Pyongyang, was changed to "Seogyeong" by Wang's Goryeo on the Korean peninsula
- Cheongju, was one of the five small capitals of Unified Silla on the Korean peninsula

== Vietnam ==
- Thanh Hóa, western capital of Lê dynasty
- Ho Chi Minh City, formerly called "Saigon"

== See also ==
- Beijing (disambiguation) — Beijing means "Northern Capital".
- Nanjing (disambiguation) — Nanjing means "Southern Capital".
- Dongjing (disambiguation) — Dongjing means "Eastern Capital".
- Shangjing (disambiguation) — Shangjing means "Supreme Capital".
