= Jiankang (disambiguation) =

Jiankang (present-day Nanjing) was the capital of the Six Dynasties in imperial China.

Jiankang may also refer to:

- Jiankang (144), era name used by Emperor Shun of Han
- Jiankang (319–320), era name used by Sima Bao
