= West Kyo =

Village in County Durham, England

Coordinates: 54°53′N 1°44′W

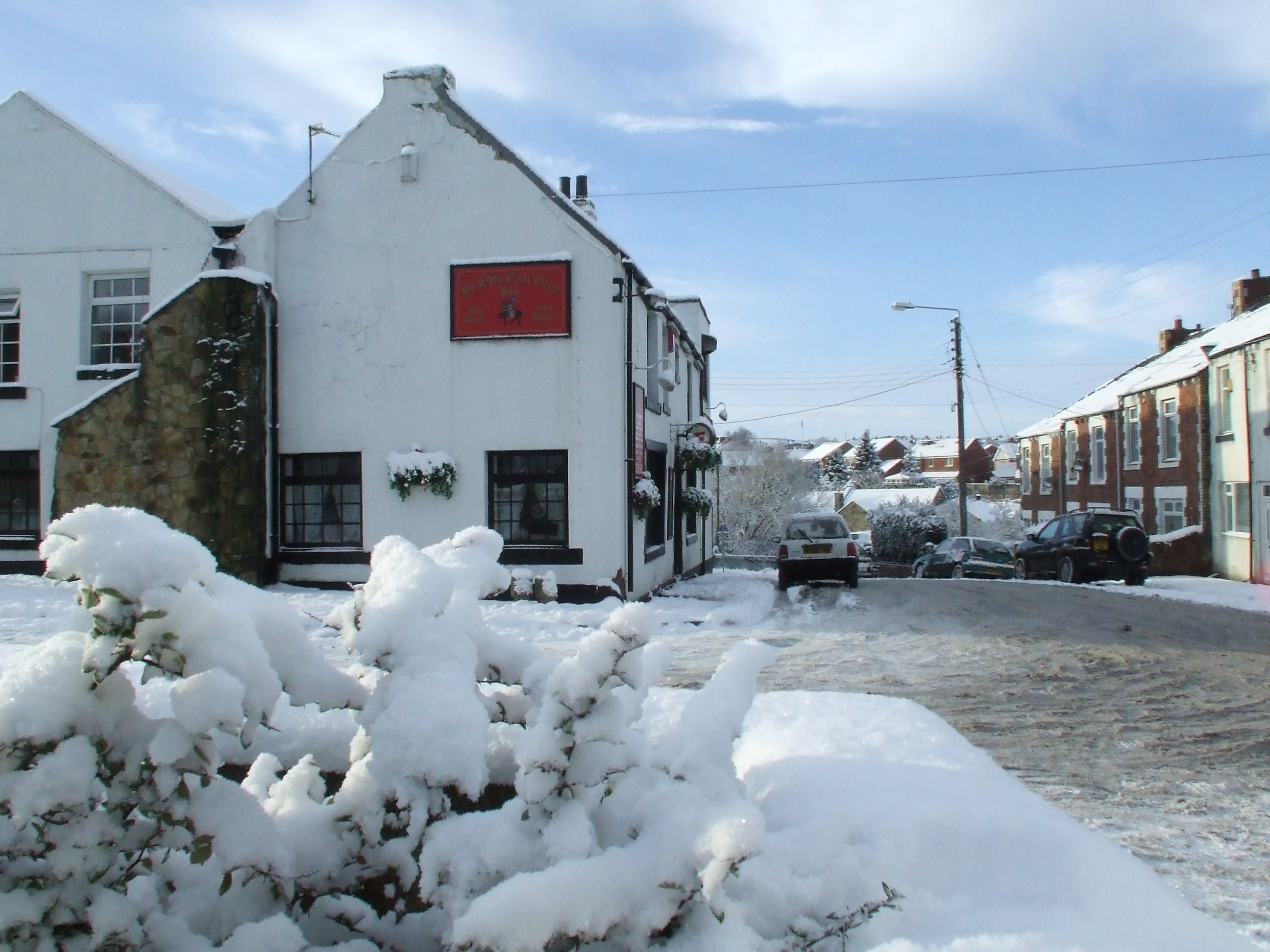
West Kyo in the winter, showing the Earl Grey Inn

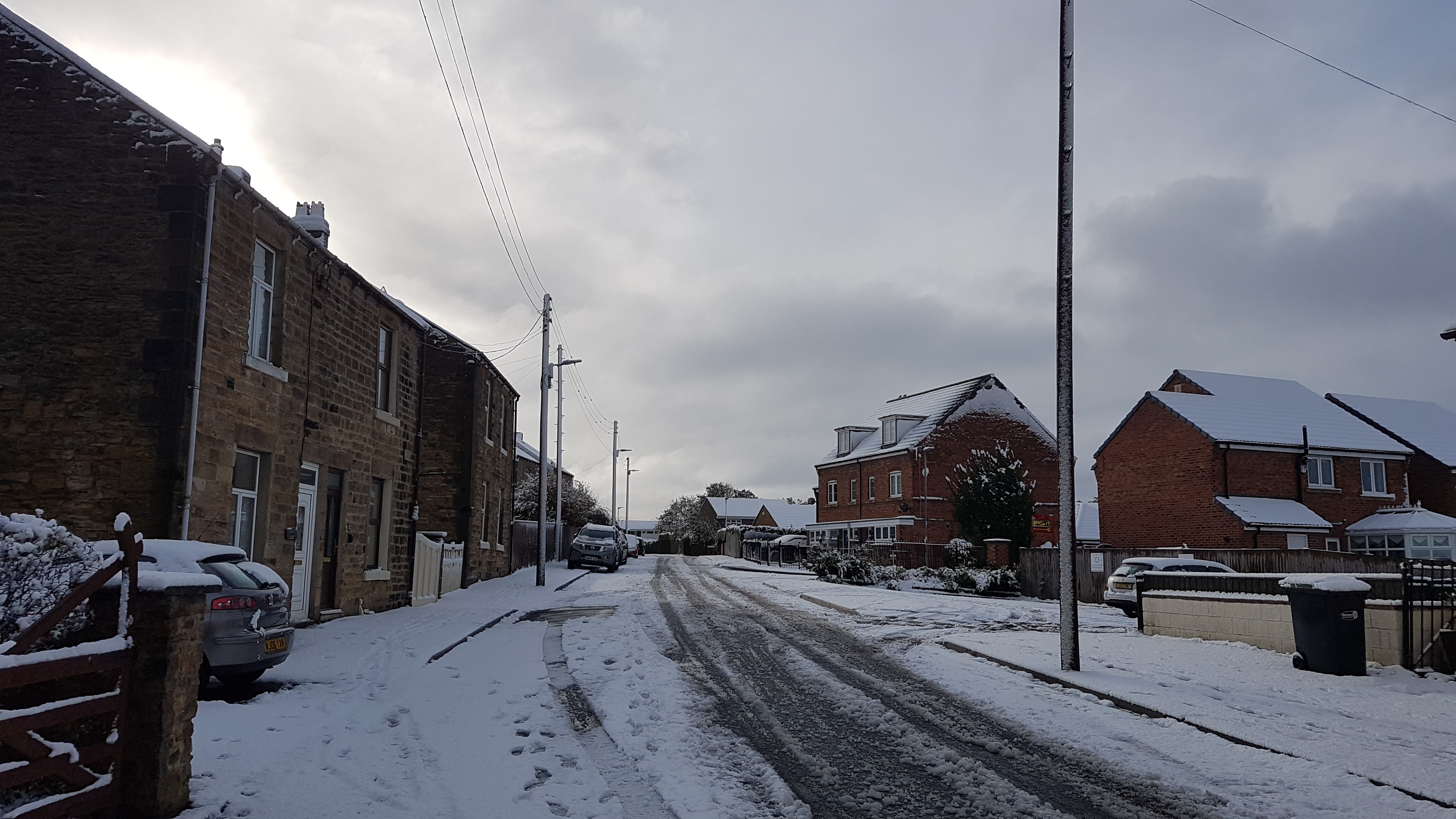
West Kyo as photographed from the Earl Grey public house south towards Fines Park, Annfield Plain

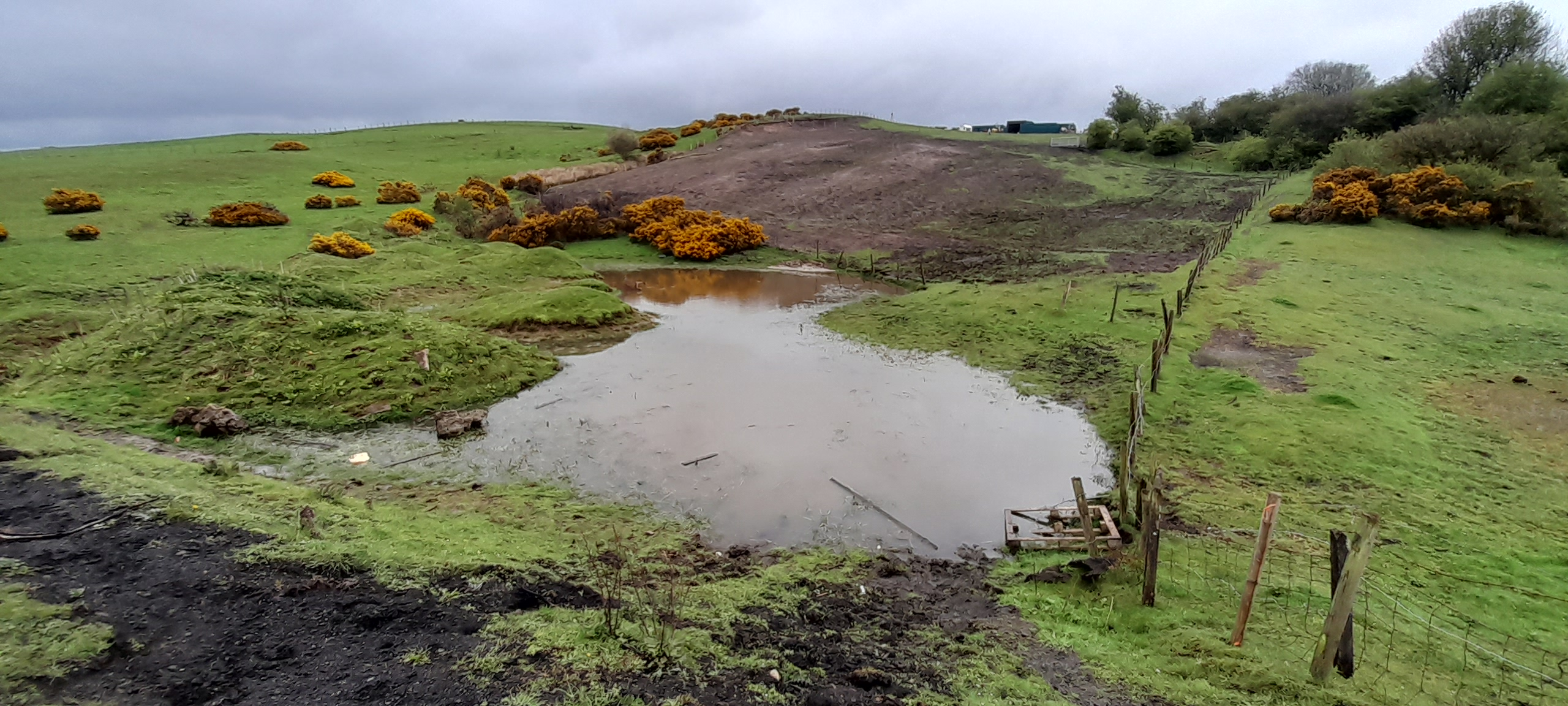
Kyo Pond adjacent to the C2C, not to be confused with Kyo Tarn, 800 m to the east. The pond still exists despite several attempts to fill it in.

West Kyo (also known locally as Old Kyo) is a small village in County Durham, England, United Kingdom. The name kyo is derived from an old word for 'cow'. It is situated a very short distance to the north of Annfield Plain and to the east of Catchgate. Close by are New Kyo, 15 minutes walk to the south at the other side of local landmark The Bogs (officially Kyo Bogs Nature Reserve), the C2C and Kyo Pond. East Kyo is 15 minutes walk to the east. Harperley is 15 minutes walk to the north. The nearest large town is Stanley. The skyline is dominated by the Pontop Pike Television Transmitter to the northwest.

== Ye Olde Earl Grey Inn ==
The main landmark of the village is the 200 year old Ye Olde Earl Grey Inn public house, with an internal decor of wooden beams and whitewashed walls (though much has been removed due to renovation).

This pub is reputed to be haunted, notably by a ghost called the Grey Lady, a former landlady who died in the 19th century.

Another former landlord also placed five and ten pence pieces in gaps within the wooden beams during the 1990s, some of which are still being found to this day. The pub was known locally for Sunday lunches, karaoke and other intermittent entertainment on Saturdays, though since the COVID-19 pandemic the Thursday night quiz has not been run.

As of 4 May 2026 the Earl Grey faces closure due to its leasehold being relinquished and its future is uncertain.

Elton John visited the Earl Grey for a meal back in 1978. Unconfirmed is the presence of his signature on a tile on the wall behind the southern end of the main bar, hidden when the bar was reconfigured several years ago.

A copy (not an original) of a Banksy artwork was installed in the men's toilets in 2014 by a previous landlady. There are also a small number of Laurel and Hardy figurines.

== Kyo Bogs Nature Reserve ==
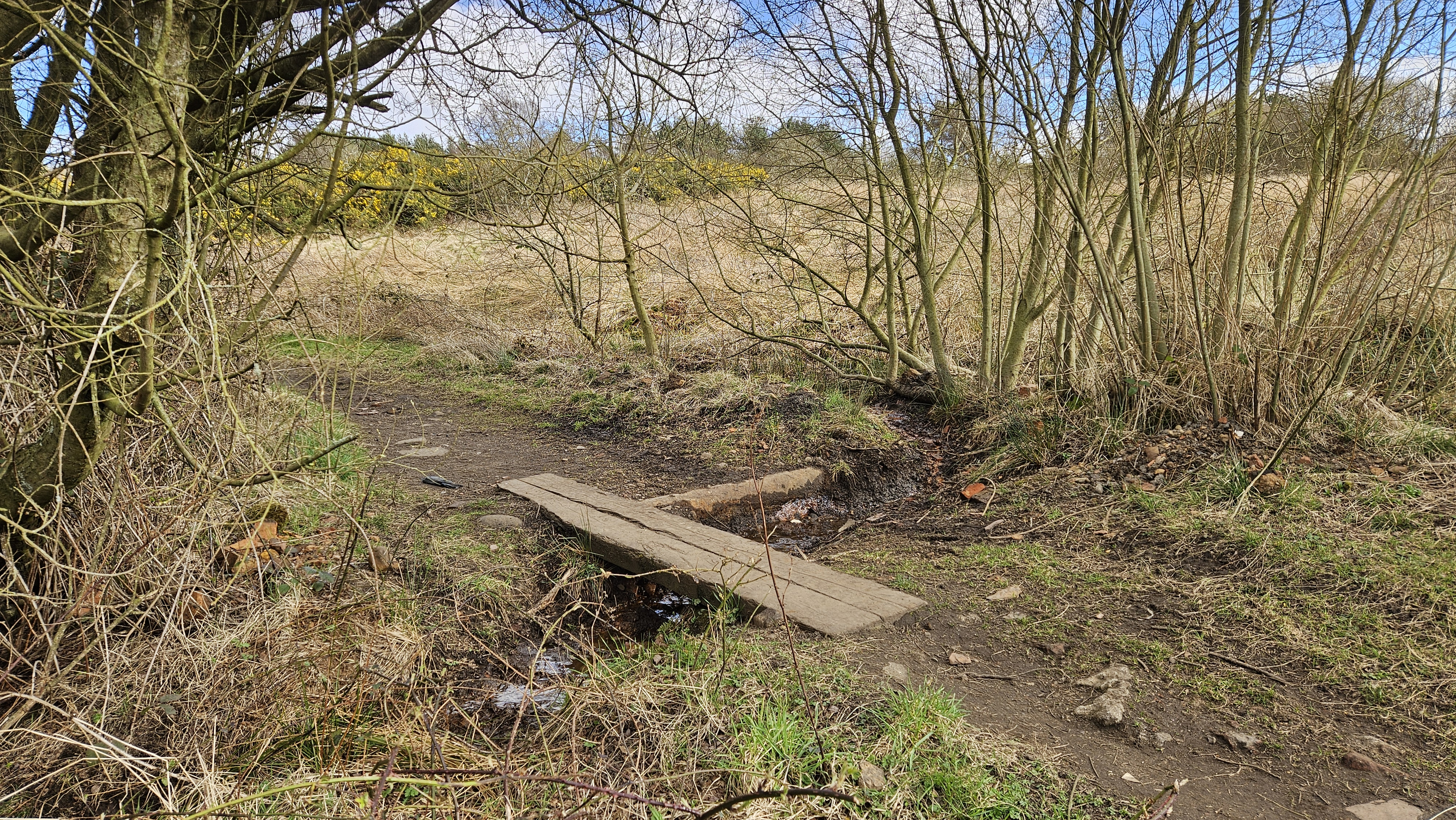
Kyo Bogs Nature Reserve, near West Kyo and Annfield Plain, County Durham, England. The small bridge in picture, nicknamed "Seagull Bridge", is the only route between the west and east ends of the bogs without using the C2C cycleway route along the reserve's south side.

Kyo Bogs Nature Reserve, also known as The Bogs or Kyo Bogs, is a small nature reserve east of Annfield Plain, and southeast of Fines Park and West Kyo, consisting of mainly gorse covered scrub with some wooded and marshy areas.

The main access is via a footpath running north–south through the middle of the reserve connecting West Kyo and Fines Park to the C2C bordering the reserve's southern edge. An unpaved and now poorly maintained footpath continues from the intersection south to New Kyo, the route as a whole formerly used by pupils attending the now demolished lower school of the defunct Greencroft Comprehensive School.

A second main path diverges from this to the south east towards the east end of the reserve, eventually crossing a small stream runs south to north across the reserve and running into the main low-lying boggy area with the disused Riding Hill Quarry visible north of it.

A small, wooden bridge takes the aforementioned path across this stream. This bridge, nicknamed "Seagull Bridge", is the only route between the west and smaller east ends of Kyo Bogs Nature Reserve without using the C2C cycleway route that runs east–west along the reserve's south side. The unusual nickname is possibly related to the nearby Sea to Sea cycle route.

The boggy area is the only surface feature of the unnamed main watercourse heading west to east along the northern side of the reserve, most of it running underground before it leaves the reserve, before passing northeast through farmland (again most underground) past the Hamlet of East Kyo, before joining Kyo / Harperley Burn at Harperley Bridge at the west end of the Hamlet of Harperley.

In the past, the reserve had a bad reputation for local youths riding motorbikes around it, but this has largely ceased. Kyo Bogs has thus had a chance to recover and there is now a wide coverage of flowers in the spring. Red deer are sometimes spotted within or near the reserve.

== History ==
The village developed during former periods of heavy coal mining in the area during the 19th century and a gas works used to be situated on its northern edge. A period of substantial decline followed during the 20th century, during which the village lost a school, a local shop and a second public house called The Rose Cottage, which had an "ale only" licence (otherwise known as a jerry, now converted to a private house). New developments starting in the late 1980s onwards have, however, seen an expansion in the village in terms of size and population.

== Famous people ==
West Kyo was the birthplace of John Buddle (1773), the famous colliery viewer and mining engineer, who later went on to work with Charles Vane, 3rd Marquess of Londonderry in the development of Seaham Harbour.

Kyo Village was the birthplace of Hugh Simpson Rodham (on 16 August 1879), Hillary Clinton's grandfather who emigrated to the United States.
