= Jianye =

Jianye may refer to:

- Jianye District, in Nanjing, Jiangsu, China
- Jiankang, also known as Jianye, ancient city in China
- Henan Jianye, Chinese football club
