= Linhuangfu =

Primary capital city of the Liao dynasty of China

Coordinates: 43°57′45″N 119°23′28″E

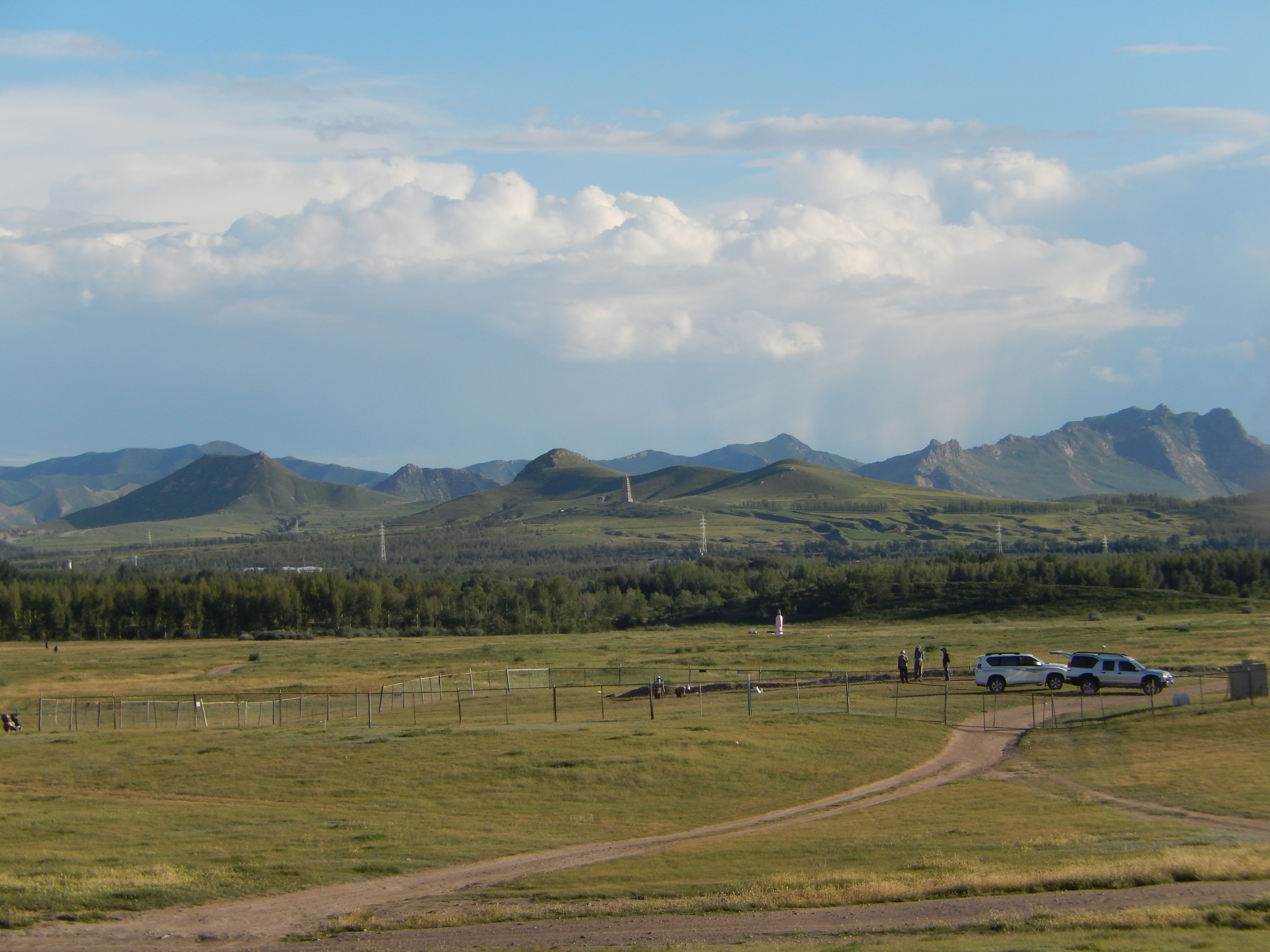
Archaeological site of Linhuangfu

Linhuangfu (simplified Chinese: 临潢府; traditional Chinese: 臨潢府; lit. 'Linhuang Prefecture') was the primary capital city of the Liao dynasty of China, during which it was also known as Shangjing (Chinese: 上京; lit. 'Upper/Supreme Capital'). The city was founded in 918 by the Liao emperor Yelü Abaoji, and was named Shangjing Linhuangfu in 938. Its ruins are located in present-day Baarin Left Banner in Chifeng, Inner Mongolia, China.

== History ==
In 918, the Liao founder Yelü Abaoji established the city as huangdu (imperial capital) in the Liaoxi steppe, the homeland of the nomadic Khitan people that established the empire. According to the History of Liao, the construction of the new city was overseen by Kang Moji (康默記), and completed within 100 days. Shangjing was modeled after the Tang capital Chang'an. The Liao took in large groups of Han Chinese refugees, many of whom were resettled in the capital as well as neighboring towns in the steppe, together with captured soldiers and civilians from northern China. The capital saw large-scale expansion and rebuilding in 926, after the Liao conquest of Bohai, including the addition of a southern "Han City" and the completion of imperial palaces. Despite Linhuangfu being the Supreme Capital, the Khitan court maintained their mobile lifestyle, constantly traveling across the empire.

Jurchens of the Jin dynasty conquered Linhuangfu in 1120, destroying much of the city. It was redesignated as the Northern Capital in 1138, and ceased to be one of the Jin capitals in 1150. The city was destroyed by the Mongol armies in 1214 and left abandoned afterwards.

== Layout ==
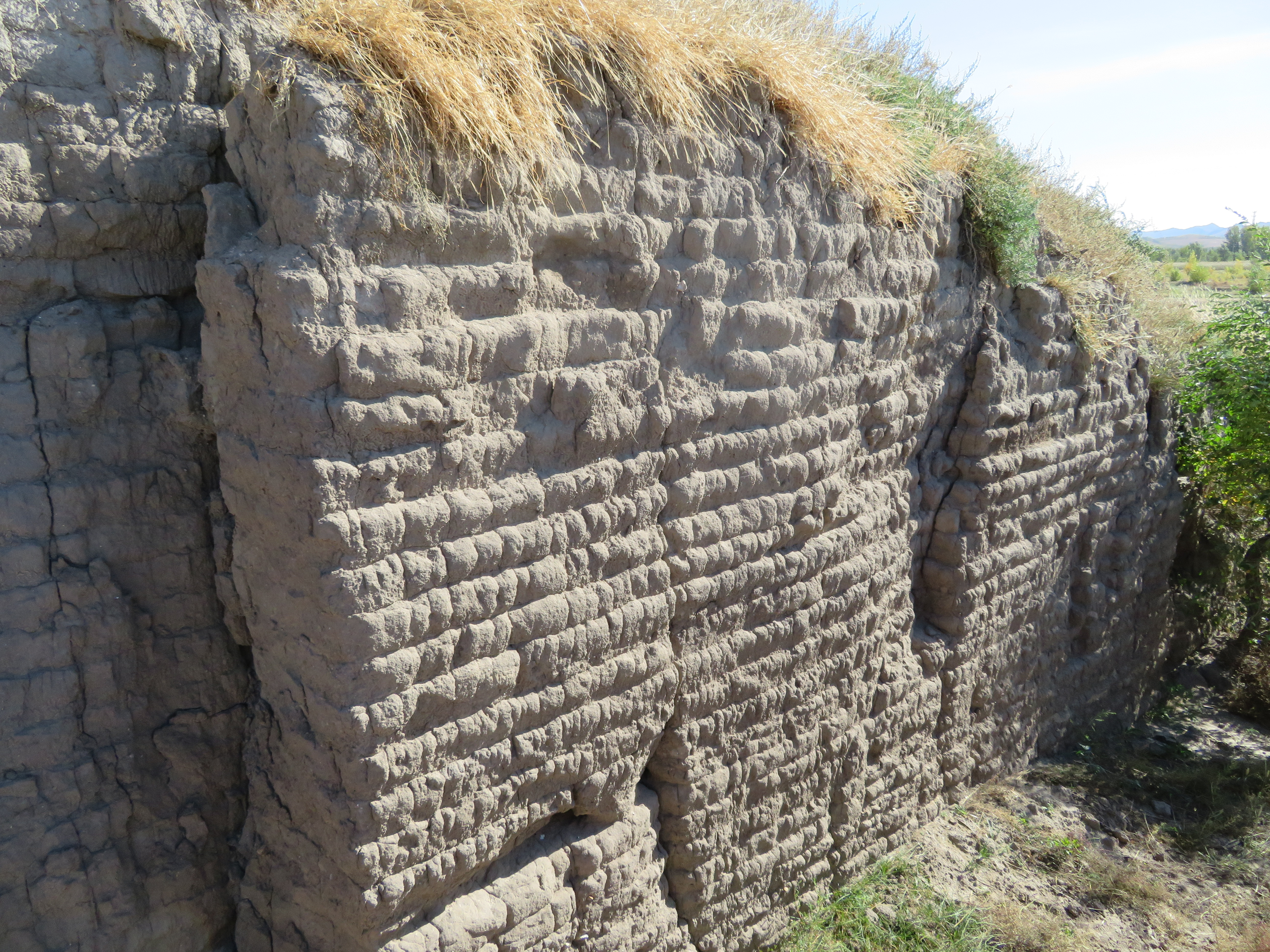
Remains of Dashun Gate, the southern gate of the Imperial City

Shangjing was located at the southern end of the Greater Khingan Range, along the Shali River. The city consisted of an Imperial City in the north and a Han City in the south, now separated by the Shali. The former housed the imperial family and the ruling elite, while the latter was the residence of Han Chinese and other non-Khitan populations. The Imperial City had an irregular square plan, and measured 1.8 kilometres (1.1 mi) by 1.6 kilometres (0.99 mi). The Han city was 1.2 kilometres (0.75 mi) by 1.6 kilometres (0.99 mi) in size. The walls of the Imperial City was up to 9 metres (30 ft) high and 15 metres (49 ft) thick, whereas the Han city had walls as high as 4 metres (13 ft) and up to 12 metres (39 ft) in thickness.

The palatial district was located in the central-eastern part of the Imperial City, with a perimeter of 2.7 kilometres (1.7 mi). A large Buddhist monastery has been confirmed on the heights near the western wall of the Imperial City.
