= East Kyo =

Coordinates: 54.869°N 1.726°W

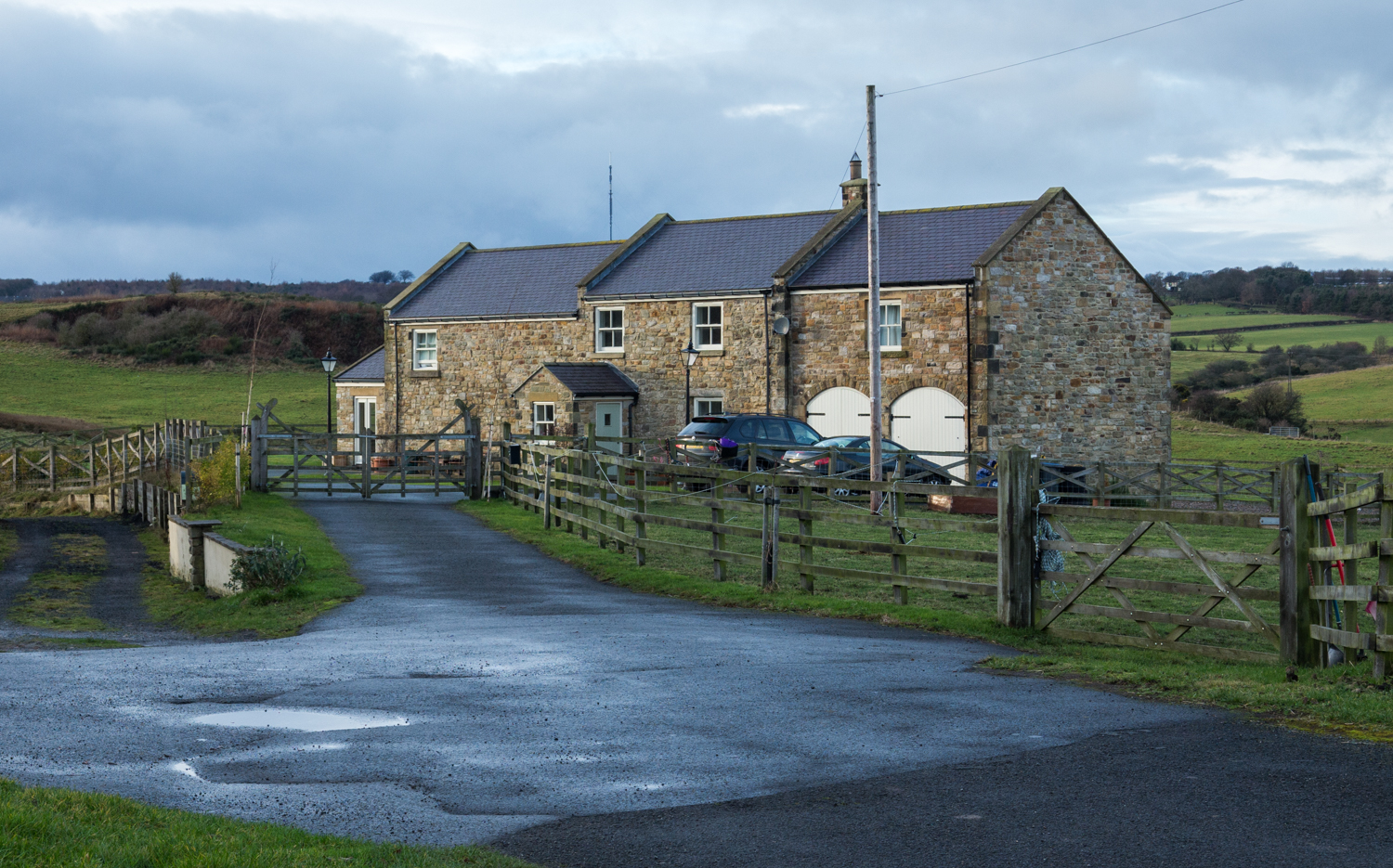
- House at East Kyo

- Location within County Durham
- OS grid reference: NZ176526
- Civil parish: Stanley
- Unitary authority: County Durham
- Ceremonial county: Durham
- Region: North East
- Country: England
- Sovereign state: United Kingdom
- Post town: DURHAM
- Postcode district: DH9
- Police: Durham
- Fire: County Durham and Darlington
- Ambulance: North East

East Kyo is a small hamlet in the civil parish of Stanley, in County Durham, England. It is situated a short distance to the west of Stanley, close to Annfield Plain, West Kyo (15 minutes walk to the west), Oxhill and Harperley. The hamlet of East Kyo consists of two farms and East Kyo House, a former public house. The public house may have had the nickname "The Widowers".

The name kyo is derived from an old word for 'cow'.
