= Shangjing =

Shangjing or 上京 may refer to:

== Historical capitals ==
- Shangjing Longquanfu, capital of Balhae, in modern Ning'an, Heilongjiang, China
- Shangjing Linhuangfu, in Inner Mongolia, China, site of former capital of the Liao dynasty
- Shangjing Huiningfu, capital of the Jin dynasty (1115-1234), in modern Harbin, Heilongjiang, China

== See also ==
- Kamigyō-ku (上京), Kyōtō Japan
- Shangdu
