= Roger Hilton =

English painter

- Born: 23 March 1911; Northwood, Middlesex, England
- Died: 23 February 1975 (aged 57); Botallack, Cornwall, England
- Known for: Painting
- Movement: Modernism, Abstract art

Oi Yoi Yoi, 1963, Tate Gallery.

Roger Hilton CBE (1911–1975) was a pioneer of abstract art in post-Second World War Britain. Often associated with the 'middle generation' of St Ives painters – Terry Frost, Patrick Heron, Peter Lanyon & Bryan Wynter – he spent much of his career in London, where his work was deeply influenced by European avant-garde movements such as tachisme and CoBrA.

He was born on 23 March 1911 in Northwood, Middlesex, and studied at the Slade School of Fine Art under Henry Tonks and also in Paris, where he developed links with painters on the Continent. At the Slade he won the Orpen prize in 1930. He was born Roger Hildesheim and his parents changed the name to Hilton in 1916, when anti-German feeling was prevalent.

In the Second World War, he served in the Army, part of the time as a Commando, for about three years being a prisoner of war after the Dieppe raid in 1942. He worked as a schoolteacher at Bryanston School, Dorset, from 1947 to 1948, and later taught at Central School of Arts and Crafts, 1954–56.

During the late 1950s and 1960s, Hilton's career began to take off and he started to spend more time in west Cornwall, moving there permanently in 1965. In the same year he married Rose Phipps, 20 years his junior, having divorced his first wife, Ruth David. He became a prominent member of the St. Ives School and gained an international reputation. He won the 1963 John Moores Painting Prize. In 1964 he exhibited at the British Pavilion at the Venice Biennale winning the UNESCO Prize. Hilton was appointed CBE in 1968.

By 1974, he was confined to bed as an invalid precipitated in part by alcoholism. His work became less abstract in his later years, often being based on the nude or images of animals. He died at Botallack, not far from St Ives, in 1975.

== Selected exhibitions ==
1952 Gimpel Fils, London

1958 Institute of Contemporary Arts, London

1960 Waddington Galleries, London

1961 Galerie Charles Lienhard, Zurich

1962 Waddington Galleries, London

1963 John Moores Exhibition, Liverpool (1st Prize)

1964 XXXII Venice Biennale (UNESCO Prize)

1974 Serpentine Gallery, London (retrospective)

1977 Waddington Galleries, London

1993 Hayward Gallery, London (retrospective)

2006 Tate Gallery, St. Ives

2008 Kettles Yard, Cambridge

== Representation in public collections ==
Arts Council Collection, London

British Council Collection

British Museum, London

Calouste Gulbenkian Foundation, Lisbon

Fogg Art Museum, Harvard

Government Art Collection

National Gallery of Canada, Ottawa

National Portrait Gallery, London

Queensland Art Gallery, Brisbane

Stedelijk Museum, Amsterdam

Tate Gallery, London

Victoria & Albert Museum

Yale Centre for British Art, New Haven

== See also ==
- List of St. Ives artists
