= Nanjing (disambiguation) =

Nanjing means "southern capital" and is the name of the current capital of Jiangsu Province and a former capital of China.

Nanjing, and romanizations Nanking, Nan-ching, and Nankin may also refer to:

== Places ==
- Nanjing (Liao Dynasty), the historical name for Beijing during the Liao dynasty
- Nanjing, a historical name for Kaifeng
- Nanjing, a historical name for Shangqiu during the Northern Song dynasty
- Taipei, the current capital of the Republic of China (Taiwan)
- Nanjing County, (Chinese: 南靖; pinyin: Nánjìng) in Zhangzhou, Fujian province
- Nankin-machi, also called “Nanjingtown” or "Nanjing Town", a Chinatown in Kobe

== Books and films ==
- Nan Jing (Chinese medicine), a classic medical work in traditional Chinese medicine
- Nanking (1938 film), a Japanese documentary film
- Nanking (2007 film), an American documentary film about the 1937 Nanjing Massacre

== Other ==
- Nanjing City F.C., a football team based in Nanjing, Jiangsu, China
- Nanjing Automobile, a state-owned automobile manufacturer
- The Nanjing Regime or Nanjing Nationalist Government, names for the Wang Jingwei regime set up by the Japanese occupation forces in China during the Second Sino-Japanese War
- Nanjing Cherry, a common name for Prunus tomentosa (a deciduous shrub)
- 2078 Nanking, an asteroid
- Nankin bantam, a bantam breed of chicken

== See also ==
- Nanjingese (disambiguation)
- Nankeen, a kind of pale yellowish cloth named for the Chinese city
- Nankeen kestrel (Falco cenchroides)
- Nankeen night heron (Nycticorax caledonicus)
