= List of places in County Durham =

Largest settlements of County Durham Administrative centres are in Yellow and Durham, as a city, is in bold.

Settlements in the ceremonial county of Durham, England, are in four unitary authorities. Some settlements, such as Sunderland and Gateshead in Tyne and Wear, are not in the present ceremonial county. Stockton and Hartlepool authorities, from when the ceremonial county designation was created in 1974 until 1996, were formerly in the Cleveland ceremonial county. Stockton's authority spans two ceremonial counties. Towns and cities are highlighted in bold.

== A ==
Aislaby, Allensford, Annfield Plain, Archdeacon Newton, Aukside, Aycliffe Village

== B ==
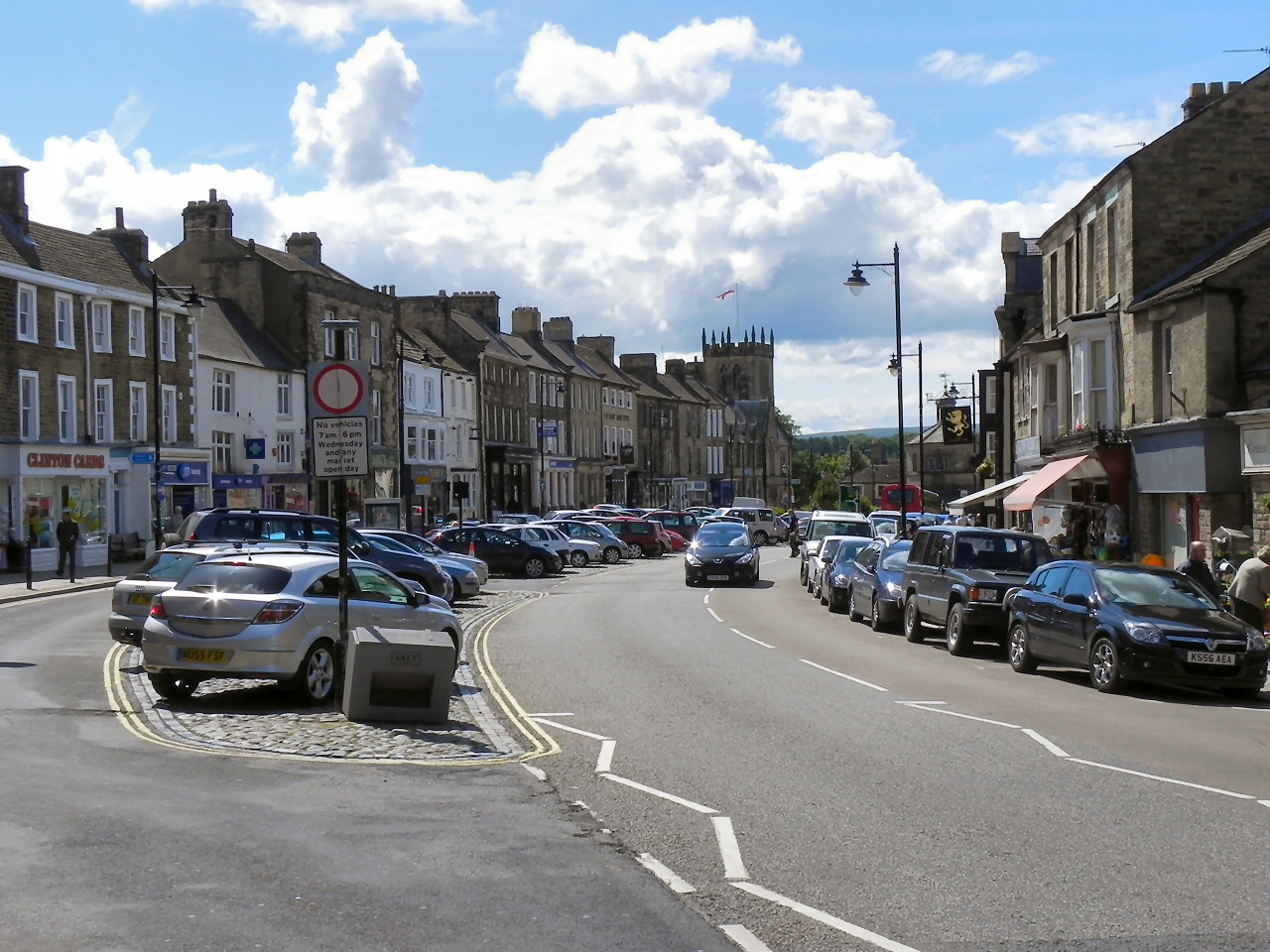
Barnard Castle

Barmpton, Barnard Castle, Barningham, Beamish, Bearpark, Beaumont Hill, Bedburn, Belmont, Benfieldside, Bildershaw, Billingham, Billy Row, Binchester, Bishop Auckland, Bishop Middleham, Bishopsgarth, Bishopton, Blackhall Colliery, Blackhall Rocks, Blackhill, Blackwell, Bolam, Boldron, Bournmoor, Bowbank, Bowburn, Bowes, Bowes Museum, Bowlees, Bradbury, Brafferton, Brancepeth, Brandon, Branksome, Bridge End, Bridgehill, Brierton, Brignall, Broom Hill, Broompark, Brotherlee, Browney, Burnhope, Burnopfield, Butterknowle, Butterwick, Byers Green, Blaydon

== C ==
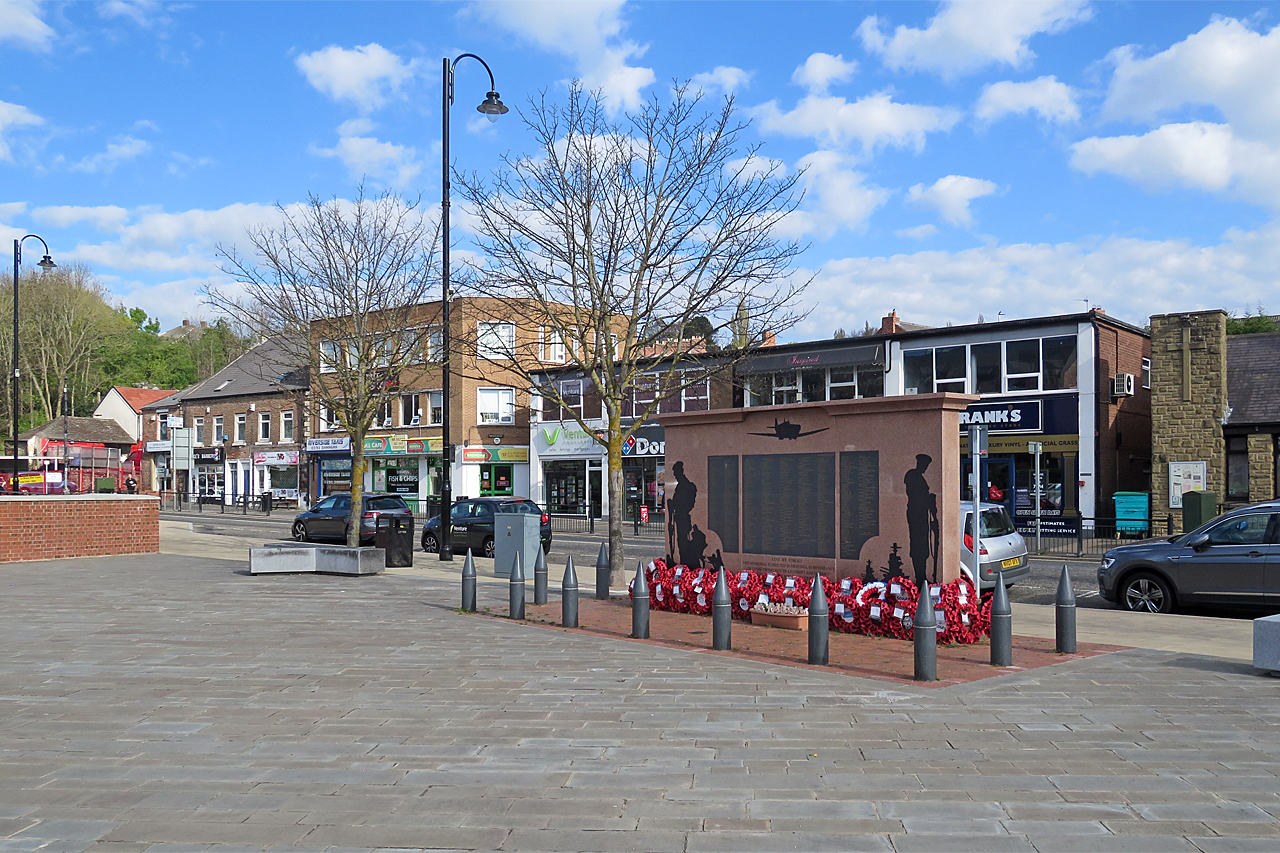
Chester-le-Street

Carlbury, Carlton, Carrville, Cassop, Castle Eden, Castleside, Catchgate, Causey, Chester Moor, Chester-le-Street, Chilton, Chilton Lane, Cleatlam, Close House, Clough Dene, Coal Bank, Cockerton, Cockfield, Cold Hesledon, Consett, Copley, Copthill, Cornforth, Cornriggs, Cornsay, Cornsay Colliery, Cotherstone, Coundon, Coundon Grange, Coundongate, Cowpen Bewley, Cowshill, Coxhoe, Craghead, Craigside, Crawleyside, Crimdon Park, Crook, Crookgate Bank, Crookhall, Croxdale, Cleadon

== D ==
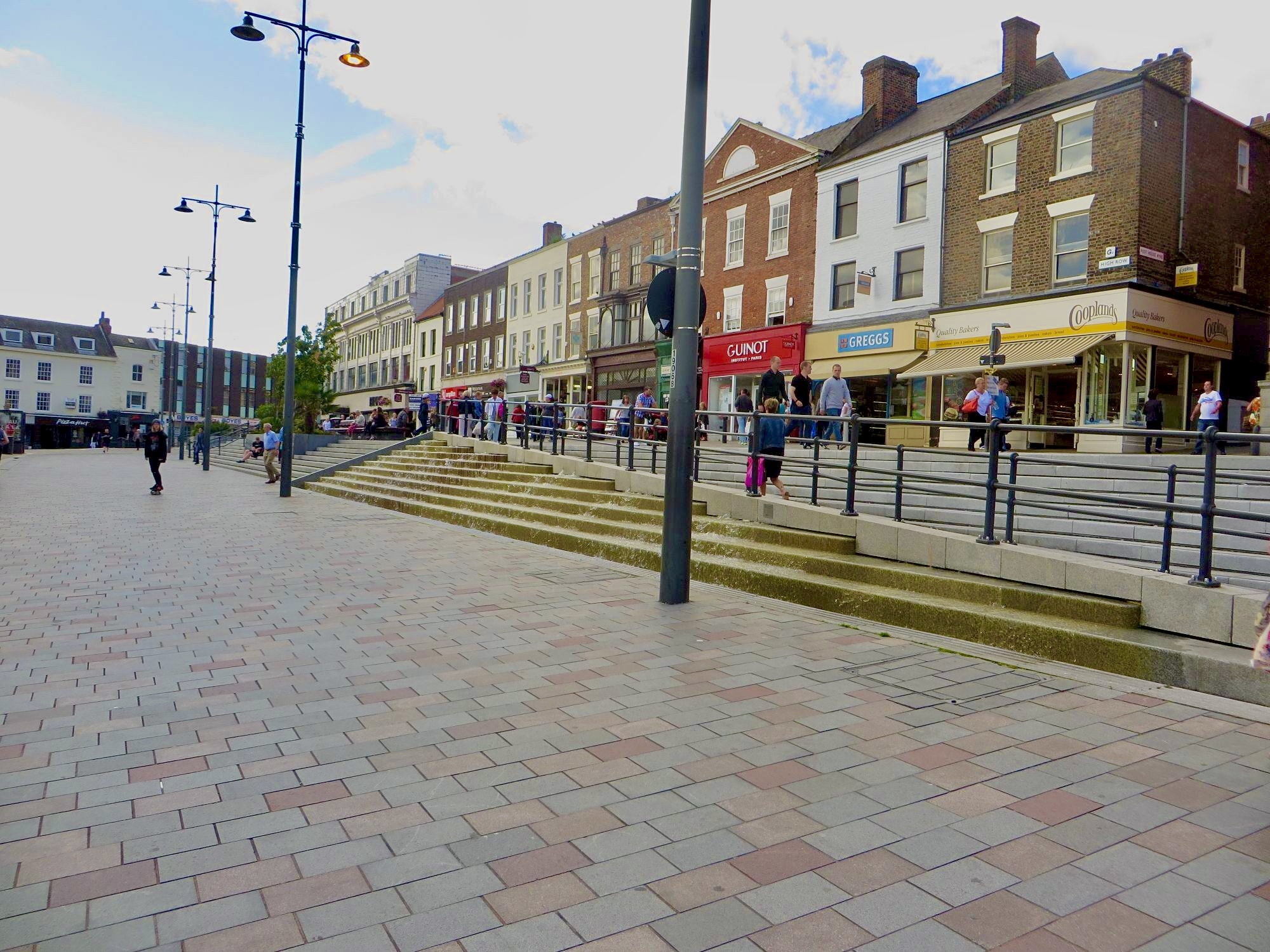
Darlington

Daddry Shield, Dalton Piercy, Dalton-le-Dale, Darlington, Dawdon, Deaf Hill, Dean Bank, Delves Lane, Deneside, Dent Bank, Denton, Dipton, Dragonville, Durham,

== E ==
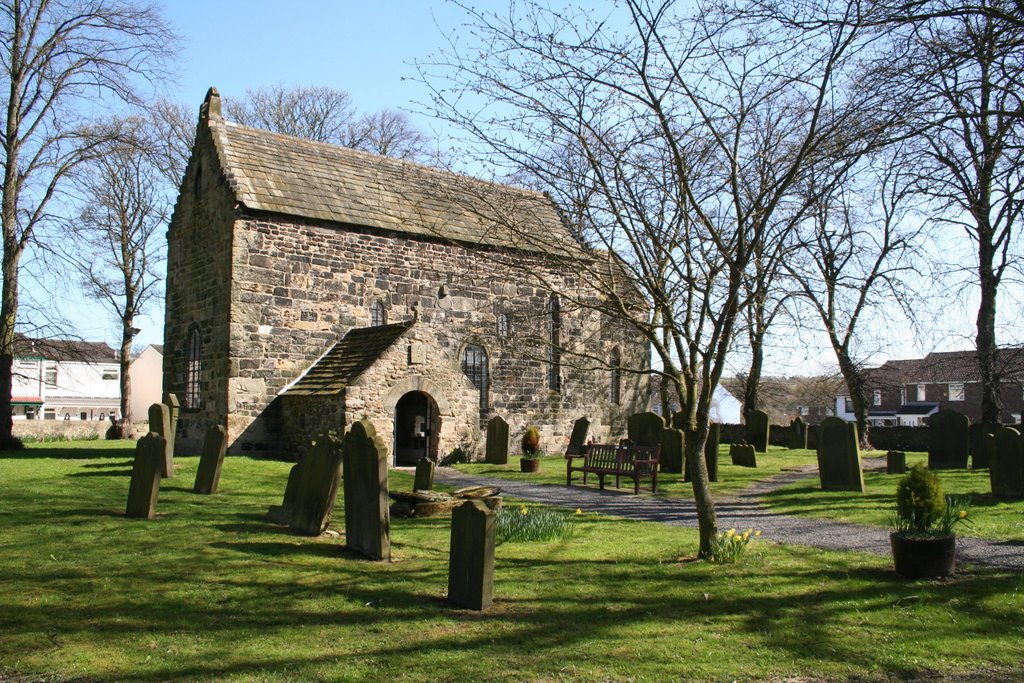
Escomb Church

Eaglescliffe, Easington, Easington Colliery, East Blackdene, East Briscoe, East Hedleyhope, East Kyo, East Law, East Stanley, Eastbourne, Eastgate, Ebchester, Eden Vale, Edmondsley, Edmundbyers, Egglesburn, Egglescliffe, Eggleston, Eldon, Eldon Lane, Elstob, Elton, Elwick, Embleton, Escomb, Esh, Esh Winning, Esperley Lane Ends, Etherley Dene, Ettersgill, Evenwood, Evenwood Gate

== F ==
Fairfield, Faverdale, Ferryhill, Ferryhill Station, Finchale Priory, Fir Tree, Firth Moor, Fishburn, Fleming Field, Flint Hill, Forest-in-Teesdale, Foxton, Framwelgate, Framwellgate Moor, Frosterley, Fulwell,

== G ==
Gainford, Garmondsway, Gilesgate, Gilesgate Moor, Gilmonby, Grange Hill, Grange Villa, Grassholme, Great Burdon, Great Chilton, Great Lumley, Great Stainton, Greatham, Greencroft, Greenhill, Greta Bridge, Grindon

== H ==
Hallgarth, Hamsterley (Bishop Auckland), Hamsterley (Consett), Hardwick, Harelaw, Harperley, Harrowgate Hill, Harrowgate Villa, Hart, Hart Station, Hartburn, Hartlepool, Hartlepool Abbey, Hartlepool railway station, Harton, Harwood, Haswell, Haswell Moor, Haswell Plough, Haughton-le-Skerne, Haverton Hill, Hawthorn, Headlam, Healeyfield, Hedley Hill, Hedworth, Heighington, Helmington Row, Hesleden, Hett, High Coniscliffe, High Dyke, High Etherley, High Forge, High Friarside, High Grange, High Haswell, High Hesledon, High Shincliffe, High Stoop, High Throston, High Urpeth, High Westwood, Hill End, Hill Top (Stanley), Hill Top (Teesdale), Hilton, Hobson, Holmside, Holwick, Horden, Horsleyhope, Houghall, Houghton Bank, Houghton-le-Side, Howden-le-Wear, Hummersknott, Hunderthwaite, Hunstanworth, Hunwick, Hurworth Place, Hurworth-on-Tees, Hury, Hutton Henry, Hutton Magna

== I ==
Ingleton, Inkerman, Ireshopeburn, Iveston,

== K ==
Kelloe, Kepier, Killerby, Kimblesworth, Kinninvie, Kip Hill, Kirk Merrington, Knitsley,

== L ==
Laithkirk, Lambton, Lanchester, Lanehead, Langdon Beck, Langley Moor, Langley Park, Langton, Lartington, Leadgate, Leamside, Leasingthorne, Leeholme, Lingfield, Lintz, Lintzgarth, Little Newsham, Little Stainton, Little Thorpe, Littletown, Longnewton, Low Coniscliffe, Low Dinsdale, Low Etherley, Low Walworth, Low Westwood, Lowes Barn, Ludworth, Lumley Thicks

== M ==
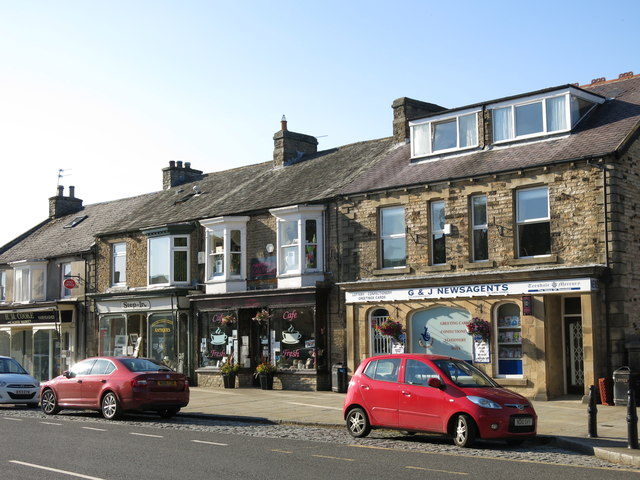
Middleton-in-Teesdale

Maiden Law, Mainsforth, Marley Hill, Meadowfield, Medomsley, Merrybent, Metal Bridge, Mickleton, Middle Side, Middlestone, Middlestone Moor, Middleton (Hartlepool), Middleton-in-Teesdale, Middleton One Row, Middleton St George, Middridge, Moor End, Mordon, Morley, Morton Tinmouth, Mount Pleasant (Spennymoor), Mount Pleasant (Stockton-on-Tees), Mowden, Muggleswick, Murton, Monkwearmouth

== N ==
Neasham, Nettlesworth, Neville's Cross, New Brancepeth, New Coundon, New House, New Hunwick, New Kyo, Newbiggin (Lanchester), Newbiggin (Teesdale), Newfield (Bishop Auckland), Newfield (Chester-le-Street), Newton Aycliffe, Newton Bewley, Newton Hall, Newton Ketton, No Place, North Bitchburn, North Close, Northlea, Norton,

== O ==
Oak Tree, Oakenshaw, Old Cassop, Old Durham, Old Eldon, Old Quarrington, Old Stillington, Old Wingate, Ornsby Hill, Ouston, Ovington, Owton Manor, Oxhill

== P ==
Page Bank, Pelton, Pelton Fell, Perkinsville, Peterlee, Phoenix Row, Pickering Nook, Piercebridge, Pittington, Pity Me, Plawsworth, Pontop Pike, Port Clarence, Portrack, Preston-le-Skerne, Preston-on-Tees

== Q ==
Quaking Houses, Quarrington Hill, Quebec,

== R ==
Rainton Gate, Ramshaw (Bishop Auckland), Ramshaw (Consett), Redmarshall, Redworth, Rift House, Rise Carr, Roddymoor, Romaldkirk, Rookhope, Roseworth, Royal Oak, Rushyford

== S ==
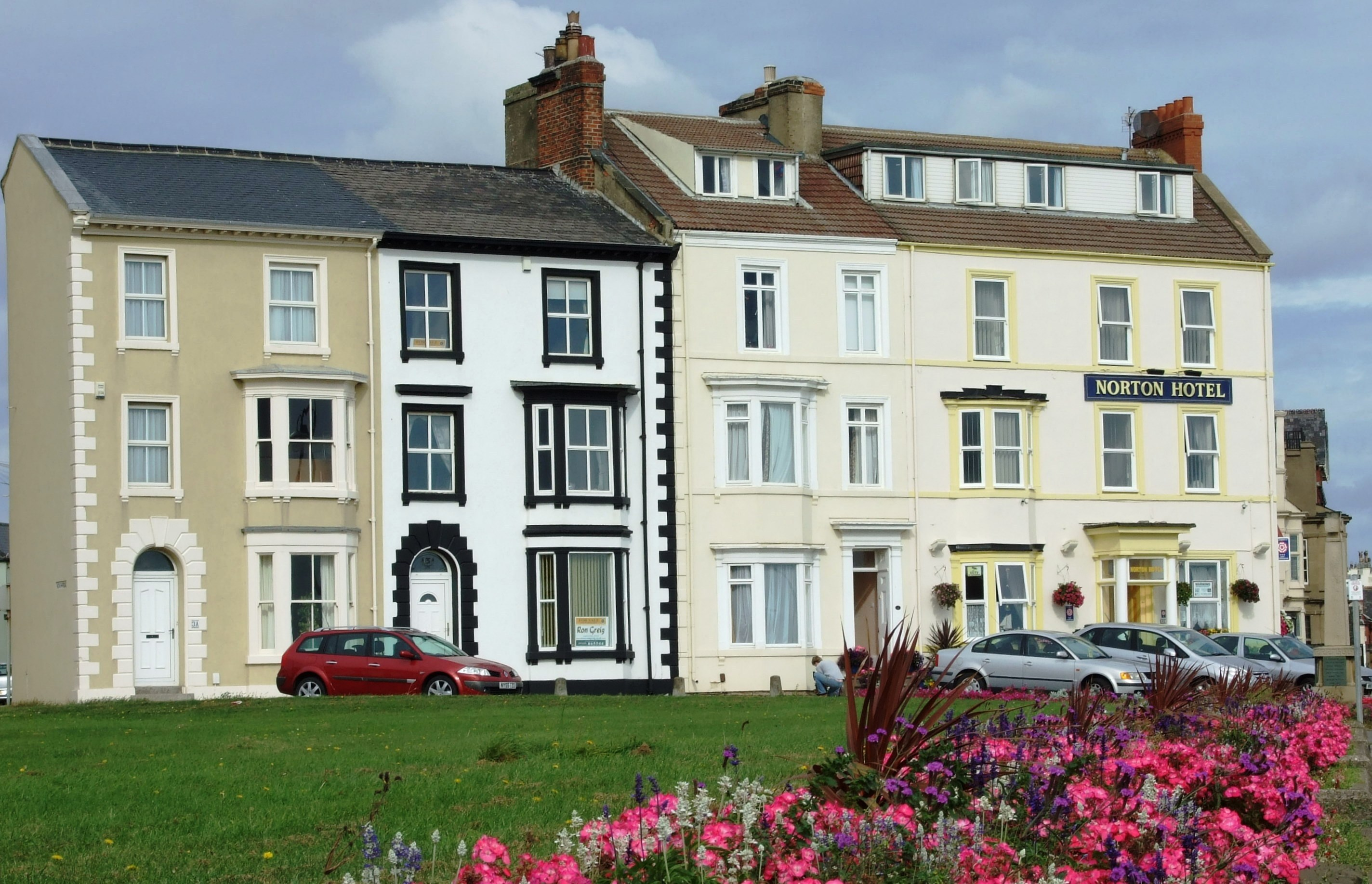
Seaton Carew, The Green

Sacriston, Sadberge, St Helen Auckland, St John's Chapel, Satley, Scargill, School Aycliffe, Seaham, Seaton, Seaton Carew, Sedgefield, Shadforth, Sheraton, Sherburn, Sherburn Hill, Shield Row, Shildon, Shincliffe, Shotley Bridge, Old Shotton, Shotton Bridge, Shotton Colliery, Skerne Park, Snaisgill, Sockburn, South Church, South Hetton, South Moor, South Pelaw, South Side, South Stanley, South Wingate, Spennymoor, Staindrop, Stainton, Stanhope, Stanley, Stanley Crook, Startforth, Station Town, Stillington, Stockton-on-Tees, Stony Heap, Summerhouse, Sunderland Bridge, Sunny Brow

== T ==
Tan Hills, Tanfield, Tantobie, The Dene, The Grove, The Headland, The Middles, The Slack, Thinford, Thornley (Durham), Thornley (Weardale), Thorpe Larches, Thorpe Thewles, Thringarth, Tindale Crescent, Todhills, Toft Hill, Toronto, Tow Law, Town Kelloe, Townfield, Trimdon, Trimdon Colliery, Trimdon Grange, Tudhoe, Tudhoe Grange, Tursdale,

== U ==
Unthank, Urlay Nook, Urpeth, Ushaw Moor, Ushaw College

== W ==
Wackerfield, Waldridge, Wall Nook, Walworth, Walworth Gate, Waskerley, Waterhouses, Weardale, Weardale Railway, Wearhead, West Auckland, West Blackdene, West Cornforth, West Kyo, West Park (Darlington), West Park (Hartlepool), West Pelton, West Rainton, West View, Western Hill, Westerton, Westgate, Westwick, Wheatley Hill, Whinfield, White-le-Head, Whitton, Whitworth, County Durham, Whorlton, Willington, Wingate, Winston, Witton Gilbert, Witton Park, Witton-le-Wear, Wolsingham, Wolviston, Woodham, Woodland, Woodside, Wycliffe

== See also ==
- List of settlements in County Durham by population
- List of civil parishes in County Durham
- List of places in England
