= List of United Kingdom locations: Em-Ez =

The United Kingdom

This is part of the list of United Kingdom locations: a gazetteer of place names in the United Kingdom showing each place's locality and geographical coordinates.

== Em ==
Location	Locality	Coordinates (links to map & photo sources)	OS grid reference
Emberton	Milton Keynes	52.13°N 00.71°W	SP8849
Embleton	Cumbria	54.65°N 03.28°W	NY1730
Embleton	Durham	54.65°N 01.36°W	NZ4129
Embleton	Northumberland	55.49°N 01.63°W	NU2322
Embo	Highland	57.90°N 04.00°W	NH8192
Emborough	Somerset	51.25°N 02.56°W	ST6151
Embo Street	Highland	57.89°N 04.02°W	NH8091
Embsay	North Yorkshire	53.97°N 02.00°W	SE0053
Emerson Park	Havering	51.57°N 00.22°E	TQ5488
Emerson's Green	South Gloucestershire	51.48°N 02.49°W	ST6676
Emerson Valley	Milton Keynes	51.99°N 00.77°W	SP8434
Emery Down	Hampshire	50.87°N 01.60°W	SU2808
Emley	Kirklees	53.61°N 01.63°W	SE2413
Emmbrook	Berkshire	51.41°N 00.86°W	SU7969
Emmer Green	Berkshire	51.47°N 00.96°W	SU7276
Emmett Carr	Derbyshire	53.28°N 01.32°W	SK4577
Emmington	Oxfordshire	51.71°N 00.93°W	SP7402
Emmotland	East Riding of Yorkshire	53.95°N 00.35°W	TA0851
Emneth	Norfolk	52.64°N 00.18°E	TF4807
Emneth Hungate	Norfolk	52.64°N 00.23°E	TF5107
Emorsgate	Norfolk	52.75°N 00.26°E	TF5320
Empingham	Rutland	52.66°N 00.59°W	SK9508
Empshott	Hampshire	51.07°N 00.93°W	SU7531
Empshott Green	Hampshire	51.06°N 00.94°W	SU7430
Emscote	Warwickshire	52.28°N 01.57°W	SP2965
Emstrey	Shropshire	52.68°N 02.71°W	SJ5210
Emsworth	Hampshire	50.84°N 00.95°W	SU7406

== En ==
Location	Locality	Coordinates (links to map & photo sources)	OS grid reference
Enaclete	Western Isles	58.14°N 06.89°W	NB1228
Enborne	Berkshire	51.38°N 01.38°W	SU4365
Enborne Row	Berkshire	51.36°N 01.36°W	SU4463
Enchmarsh	Shropshire	52.55°N 02.73°W	SO5096
Enderby	Leicestershire	52.58°N 01.21°W	SP5399
Endmoor	Cumbria	54.25°N 02.70°W	SD5485
Endon	Staffordshire	53.07°N 02.12°W	SJ9253
Endon Bank	Staffordshire	53.07°N 02.12°W	SJ9253
Energlyn	Caerphilly	51.58°N 03.24°W	ST1488
Enfield	Worcestershire	52.31°N 01.95°W	SP0368
Enfield	Greater London	51.64°N 00.07°W	TQ3396
Enfield Highway	Enfield	51.65°N 00.04°W	TQ3597
Enfield Lock	Enfield	51.66°N 00.03°W	TQ3698
Enfield Town	Enfield	51.64°N 00.09°W	TQ3296
Enfield Wash	Enfield	51.66°N 00.04°W	TQ3598
Enford	Wiltshire	51.25°N 01.81°W	SU1351
Engamoor	Shetland Islands	60.29°N 01.54°W	HU2557
Engedi	Isle of Anglesey	53.25°N 04.46°W	SH3676
Engine Common	South Gloucestershire	51.55°N 02.44°W	ST6984
Englefield	Berkshire	51.44°N 01.10°W	SU6272
Englefield Green	Surrey	51.42°N 00.57°W	SU9971
Englesea-brook	Cheshire	53.05°N 02.37°W	SJ7551
English Bicknor	Gloucestershire	51.83°N 02.61°W	SO5815
Englishcombe	Bath and North East Somerset	51.35°N 02.41°W	ST7162
English Frankton	Shropshire	52.85°N 02.81°W	SJ4529
Engollan	Cornwall	50.49°N 05.01°W	SW8670
Enham Alamein	Hampshire	51.23°N 01.48°W	SU3649
Enis	Devon	51.01°N 04.05°W	SS5626
Enmore	Somerset	51.10°N 03.08°W	ST2435
Enmore Field	Herefordshire	52.27°N 02.79°W	SO4664
Enmore Green	Dorset	51.00°N 02.21°W	ST8523
Ennerdale Bridge	Cumbria	54.52°N 03.43°W	NY0715
Enniscaven	Cornwall	50.39°N 04.87°W	SW9659
Enoch	Dumfries and Galloway	55.29°N 03.78°W	NS8701
Enochdhu	Perth and Kinross	56.74°N 03.53°W	NO0662
Ensay	Western Isles	57.76°N 07.08°W	NF976863
Ensbury	Bournemouth	50.76°N 01.88°W	SZ0896
Ensbury Park	Bournemouth	50.74°N 01.90°W	SZ0794
Ensdon	Shropshire	52.73°N 02.89°W	SJ4016
Enslow	Oxfordshire	51.85°N 01.30°W	SP4818
Enstone	Oxfordshire	51.91°N 01.46°W	SP3724
Enterkinfoot	Dumfries and Galloway	55.31°N 03.79°W	NS8604
Enterpen	North Yorkshire	54.43°N 01.29°W	NZ4605
Enton Green	Surrey	51.15°N 00.64°W	SU9540
Enville	Staffordshire	52.47°N 02.26°W	SO8286

== Eo ==
Location	Locality	Coordinates (links to map & photo sources)	OS grid reference
Eoligarry	Western Isles	57.03°N 07.44°W	NF7007
Eoropie / Eòropaidh	Western Isles	58.50°N 06.27°W	NB5165
Eorsa	Argyll and Bute	56.46°N 06.08°W	NM482375

== Ep ==
Location	Locality	Coordinates (links to map & photo sources)	OS grid reference
Epney	Gloucestershire	51.79°N 02.34°W	SO7611
Epperstone	Nottinghamshire	53.02°N 01.03°W	SK6548
Epping	Essex	51.69°N 00.09°E	TL4502
Epping Green	Essex	51.72°N 00.06°E	TL4305
Epping Green	Hertfordshire	51.73°N 00.13°W	TL2906
Epping Upland	Essex	51.71°N 00.08°E	TL4404
Eppleby	North Yorkshire	54.51°N 01.73°W	NZ1713
Eppleworth	East Riding of Yorkshire	53.76°N 00.46°W	TA0131
Epsom	Surrey	51.32°N 00.27°W	TQ2060
Epwell	Oxfordshire	52.05°N 01.49°W	SP3540
Epworth	North Lincolnshire	53.51°N 00.82°W	SE7803
Epworth Turbary	North Lincolnshire	53.51°N 00.85°W	SE7603

== Er ==
Location	Locality	Coordinates (links to map & photo sources)	OS grid reference
Erbistock	Wrexham	52.96°N 02.96°W	SJ3541
Erbusaig	Highland	57.29°N 05.72°W	NG7629
Erchless Castle	Highland	57.42°N 04.66°W	NH4040
Erdington	Birmingham	52.51°N 01.83°W	SP1191
Eredine	Argyll and Bute	56.23°N 05.29°W	NM9609
Eridge Green	East Sussex	51.09°N 00.21°E	TQ5535
Eriska	Argyll and Bute	56.52°N 05.40°W	NM904424
Eriskay	Western Isles	57.07°N 07.29°W	NF796109
Eriswell	Suffolk	52.37°N 00.52°E	TL7278
Erith	Bexley	51.47°N 00.15°E	TQ5077
Erlestoke	Wiltshire	51.27°N 02.05°W	ST9653
Ermington	Devon	50.36°N 03.92°W	SX6353
Ernesettle	Devon	50.41°N 04.18°W	SX4559
Erpingham	Norfolk	52.83°N 01.24°E	TG1931
Erriottwood	Kent	51.29°N 00.76°E	TQ9359
Errogie	Highland	57.26°N 04.40°W	NH5522
Errol	Perth and Kinross	56.38°N 03.21°W	NO2522
Erskine	Renfrewshire	55.90°N 04.48°W	NS4571
Erth Barton	Cornwall	50.384°N 04.277°W	SX3856
Erwarton	Suffolk	51.96°N 01.21°E	TM2134
Erwood	Powys	52.06°N 03.32°W	SO0942
Eryholme	North Yorkshire	54.46°N 01.50°W	NZ3208
Eryrys	Denbighshire	53.10°N 03.19°W	SJ2057

== Es ==
Location	Locality	Coordinates (links to map & photo sources)	OS grid reference
Escomb	Durham	54.66°N 01.72°W	NZ1830
Escott	Somerset	51.12°N 03.30°W	ST0937
Escrick	North Yorkshire	53.87°N 01.04°W	SE6342
Esgairgeiliog	Powys	52.63°N 03.84°W	SH7506
Esgyryn	Conwy	53.28°N 03.80°W	SH8078
Esh	Durham	54.79°N 01.70°W	NZ1944
Esha Ness	Shetland Islands	60.48°N 01.63°W	HU204776
Esher	Surrey	51.36°N 00.36°W	TQ1464
Eshiels	Scottish Borders	55.63°N 03.16°W	NT2739
Esholt	Bradford	53.85°N 01.72°W	SE1840
Eshott	Northumberland	55.26°N 01.68°W	NZ2097
Eshton	North Yorkshire	54.00°N 02.10°W	SD9356
Esh Winning	Durham	54.76°N 01.70°W	NZ1941
Eskadale	Highland	57.41°N 04.58°W	NH4539
Eskbank	Midlothian	55.88°N 03.08°W	NT3266
Eskdale Green	Cumbria	54.38°N 03.32°W	NY1400
Eskdalemuir	Dumfries and Galloway	55.26°N 03.18°W	NY2597
Eske	East Riding of Yorkshire	53.88°N 00.39°W	TA0543
Eskham	Lincolnshire	53.46°N 00.04°E	TF3698
Eskholme	Doncaster	53.64°N 01.04°W	SE6317
Esk Valley	North Yorkshire	54.42°N 00.73°W	NZ8204
Eslington Park	Northumberland	55.40°N 01.93°W	NU0412
Esperley Lane Ends	Durham	54.61°N 01.80°W	NZ1324
Esprick	Lancashire	53.81°N 02.91°W	SD4036
Essendine	Rutland	52.69°N 00.46°W	TF0412
Essendon	Hertfordshire	51.75°N 00.16°W	TL2708
Essington	Staffordshire	52.62°N 02.06°W	SJ9603
Eston	Redcar and Cleveland	54.56°N 01.15°W	NZ5519
Estover	Devon	50.41°N 04.11°W	SX5059
Eswick	Shetland Islands	60.25°N 01.13°W	HU4853

== Et ==
Location	Locality	Coordinates (links to map & photo sources)	OS grid reference
Etal	Northumberland	55.64°N 02.12°W	NT9239
Etchilhampton	Wiltshire	51.33°N 01.94°W	SU0460
Etchingham	East Sussex	51.00°N 00.43°E	TQ7126
Etchinghill	Kent	51.10°N 01.08°E	TR1639
Etchinghill	Staffordshire	52.75°N 01.97°W	SK0218
Etchingwood	East Sussex	50.97°N 00.13°E	TQ5022
Etherdwick	East Riding of Yorkshire	53.82°N 00.13°W	TA2337
Etherley Dene	Durham	54.64°N 01.70°W	NZ1928
Etling Green	Norfolk	52.67°N 00.97°E	TG0113
Etloe	Gloucestershire	51.74°N 02.47°W	SO6705
Eton	Berkshire	51.48°N 00.61°W	SU9677
Eton Wick	Berkshire	51.49°N 00.63°W	SU9578
Etruria	City of Stoke-on-Trent	53.02°N 02.21°W	SJ8647
Etsell	Shropshire	52.62°N 02.96°W	SJ3503
Etterby	Cumbria	54.90°N 02.96°W	NY3857
Etteridge	Highland	57.00°N 04.17°W	NN6892
Ettersgill	Durham	54.65°N 02.18°W	NY8829
Ettiley Heath	Cheshire	53.13°N 02.40°W	SJ7360
Ettingshall	Wolverhampton	52.56°N 02.10°W	SO9396
Ettingshall Park	Dudley	52.55°N 02.11°W	SO9295
Ettington	Warwickshire	52.12°N 01.62°W	SP2648
Etton	Cambridgeshire	52.64°N 00.31°W	TF1406
Etton	East Riding of Yorkshire	53.87°N 00.51°W	SE9843
Ettrick	Scottish Borders	55.41°N 03.15°W	NT2714
Ettrickbridge	Scottish Borders	55.50°N 02.98°W	NT3824
Etwall	Derbyshire	52.87°N 01.61°W	SK2631
Etwall Common	Derbyshire	52.86°N 01.60°W	SK2730

== Eu ==
Location	Locality	Coordinates (links to map & photo sources)	OS grid reference
Eudon Burnell	Shropshire	52.49°N 02.45°W	SO6989
Eudon George	Shropshire	52.48°N 02.47°W	SO6888
Euston	Suffolk	52.37°N 00.77°E	TL8979
Euxton	Lancashire	53.65°N 02.68°W	SD5518

== Ev ==
Location	Locality	Coordinates (links to map & photo sources)	OS grid reference
Evanstown	Bridgend	51.59°N 03.48°W	SS9789
Evanton	Highland	57.66°N 04.34°W	NH6066
Evedon	Lincolnshire	53.00°N 00.37°W	TF0947
Eve Hill	Dudley	52.50°N 02.10°W	SO9390
Evelix	Highland	57.89°N 04.09°W	NH7691
Evelyn	Lewisham	51.484°N 0.032°W	TQ366780
Evendine	Herefordshire	52.06°N 02.36°W	SO7541
Evenjobb	Powys	52.25°N 03.08°W	SO2662
Evenley	Northamptonshire	52.00°N 01.15°W	SP5834
Evenlode	Gloucestershire	51.95°N 01.68°W	SP2229
Even Pits	Herefordshire	52.02°N 02.64°W	SO5636
Even Swindon	Swindon	51.56°N 01.81°W	SU1385
Evenwood	Durham	54.62°N 01.76°W	NZ1525
Evenwood Gate	Durham	54.61°N 01.75°W	NZ1624
Everbay	Orkney Islands	59.10°N 02.57°W	HY6724
Evercreech	Somerset	51.14°N 02.51°W	ST6438
Everdon	Northamptonshire	52.20°N 01.13°W	SP5957
Everingham	East Riding of Yorkshire	53.86°N 00.78°W	SE8042
Everleigh	Wiltshire	51.27°N 01.71°W	SU2053
Eversholt	Bedfordshire	51.98°N 00.55°W	SP9933
Evershot	Dorset	50.83°N 02.61°W	ST5704
Eversley	Essex	51.56°N 00.50°E	TQ7488
Eversley	Hampshire	51.35°N 00.89°W	SU7762
Eversley Centre	Hampshire	51.34°N 00.88°W	SU7861
Eversley Cross	Hampshire	51.34°N 00.86°W	SU7961
Everthorpe	East Riding of Yorkshire	53.76°N 00.63°W	SE9031
Everton	Hampshire	50.74°N 01.59°W	SZ2994
Everton	Bedfordshire	52.14°N 00.24°W	TL2051
Everton	Nottinghamshire	53.41°N 00.96°W	SK6991
Everton	Liverpool	53.42°N 02.97°W	SJ3592
Evertown	Dumfries and Galloway	55.07°N 03.01°W	NY3576
Evesbatch	Herefordshire	52.12°N 02.46°W	SO6848
Evesham	Worcestershire	52.08°N 01.95°W	SP0343
Evington	Kent	51.16°N 01.00°E	TR1045
Evington	City of Leicester	52.62°N 01.08°W	SK6203

== Ew ==
Location	Locality	Coordinates (links to map & photo sources)	OS grid reference
Ewanrigg	Cumbria	54.70°N 03.50°W	NY0335
Ewden Village	Sheffield	53.46°N 01.59°W	SK2796
Ewell	Surrey	51.34°N 00.26°W	TQ2162
Ewell Minnis	Kent	51.14°N 01.22°E	TR2643
Ewelme	Oxfordshire	51.61°N 01.07°W	SU6491
Ewen	Gloucestershire	51.67°N 02.00°W	SU0097
Ewenny	The Vale Of Glamorgan	51.48°N 03.58°W	SS9077
Ewerby	Lincolnshire	53.00°N 00.33°W	TF1247
Ewerby Thorpe	Lincolnshire	53.00°N 00.31°W	TF1347
Ewhurst	Surrey	51.14°N 00.44°W	TQ0940
Ewhurst Green	East Sussex	50.98°N 00.54°E	TQ7924
Ewhurst Green	Surrey	51.14°N 00.44°W	TQ0939
Ewloe	Flintshire	53.18°N 03.06°W	SJ2966
Ewloe Green	Flintshire	53.18°N 03.07°W	SJ2866
Ewood	Lancashire	53.72°N 02.50°W	SD6725
Ewood Bridge	Lancashire	53.67°N 02.31°W	SD7920
Eworthy	Devon	50.73°N 04.21°W	SX4495
Ewshot	Hampshire	51.23°N 00.84°W	SU8149
Ewyas Harold	Herefordshire	51.94°N 02.90°W	SO3828

== Ex ==
Location	Locality	Coordinates (links to map & photo sources)	OS grid reference
Exbourne	Devon	50.80°N 03.98°W	SS6002
Exbury	Hampshire	50.79°N 01.40°W	SU4200
Exceat	East Sussex	50.77°N 00.14°E	TV5199
Exebridge	Devon	51.00°N 03.52°W	SS9324
Exelby	North Yorkshire	54.26°N 01.55°W	SE2986
Exeter	Devon	50.71°N 03.53°W	SX9292
Exford	Somerset	51.12°N 03.64°W	SS8538
Exfords Green	Shropshire	52.64°N 02.81°W	SJ4505
Exhall (Bedworth)	Warwickshire	52.46°N 01.48°W	SP3585
Exhall (Stratford-on-Avon)	Warwickshire	52.19°N 01.85°W	SP1055
Exlade Street	Oxfordshire	51.53°N 01.06°W	SU6582
Exley	Calderdale	53.69°N 01.86°W	SE0922
Exley Head	Bradford	53.85°N 01.94°W	SE0440
Exminster	Devon	50.67°N 03.50°W	SX9487
Exmouth	Devon	50.62°N 03.41°W	SY0081
Exnaboe	Shetland Islands	59.89°N 01.30°W	HU3912
Exning	Suffolk	52.25°N 00.35°E	TL6165
Exted	Kent	51.15°N 01.08°E	TR1644
Exton	Hampshire	50.98°N 01.13°W	SU6121
Exton	Somerset	51.08°N 03.54°W	SS9233
Exton	Devon	50.66°N 03.44°W	SX9886
Exton	Rutland	52.68°N 00.64°W	SK9211
Exwick	Devon	50.72°N 03.56°W	SX9093

== Ey ==
Location	Locality	Coordinates (links to map & photo sources)	OS grid reference
Eyam	Derbyshire	53.28°N 01.68°W	SK2176
Eydon	Northamptonshire	52.14°N 01.21°W	SP5450
Eye	Suffolk	52.31°N 01.13°E	TM1473
Eye	Herefordshire	52.26°N 02.74°W	SO4963
Eye	Cambridgeshire	52.60°N 00.19°W	TF2202
Eye Green	Cambridgeshire	52.61°N 00.19°W	TF2203
Eyemouth	Scottish Borders	55.86°N 02.09°W	NT9464
Eye Peninsula	Western Isles	58.21°N 06.20°W	NB529332
Eyeworth	Bedfordshire	52.08°N 00.19°W	TL2445
Eyhorne Street	Kent	51.25°N 00.62°E	TQ8354
Eyke	Suffolk	52.10°N 01.37°E	TM3151
Eynesbury	Cambridgeshire	52.21°N 00.27°W	TL1859
Eynhallow	Orkney Islands	59.14°N 03.12°W	HY360293
Eynort	Highland	57.25°N 06.34°W	NG3826
Eynsford	Kent	51.36°N 00.19°E	TQ5365
Eynsham	Oxfordshire	51.77°N 01.37°W	SP4309
Eype Mouth	Dorset	50.71°N 02.79°W	SY4491
Eyre (Skye)	Highland	57.48°N 06.32°W	NG4152
Eyre (Raasay)	Highland	57.33°N 06.03°W	NG5734
Eyres Monsell	Leicestershire	52.58°N 01.16°W	SP5799
Eysey	Wiltshire	51.648°N 1.838°W	SU113944
Eythorne	Kent	51.19°N 01.26°E	TR2849
Eyton	Herefordshire	52.24°N 02.77°W	SO4761
Eyton (Alberbury with Cardeston)	Shropshire	52.71°N 02.93°W	SJ3713
Eyton (Lydbury North)	Shropshire	52.47°N 02.92°W	SO3787
Eyton	Wrexham	52.98°N 02.98°W	SJ3444
Eyton on Severn	Shropshire	52.65°N 02.63°W	SJ5706
Eyton upon the Weald Moors	Shropshire	52.73°N 02.51°W	SJ6515
