= Mount Pleasant, County Durham =

There are two places in County Durham, England called Mount Pleasant:

- Mount Pleasant, Spennymoor
- Mount Pleasant, Stockton-on-Tees
