= Epping Green =

Epping Green may refer to the following places in England:

- Epping Green, Essex
- Epping Green, Hertfordshire, a location
