= Oakenshaw =

Oakenshaw can refer to four villages in England:

- Oakenshaw, County Durham
- Oakenshaw, Lancashire
- Oakenshaw, West Yorkshire
- Oakenshaw, Worcestershire

It may also refer to the geographically different

- Oakenshaw railway station (disused), south east of Wakefield, West Yorkshire, England
- Oakenshawe Historic District, Baltimore, Maryland, United States
