= Inkerman (disambiguation) =

Inkerman can refer to:

== Places ==
- Inkerman, a town in Crimea and the site of the Battle of Inkerman
- Inkerman, County Durham, a village in County Durham, in England
- Inkerman, Pennsylvania, a village in the United States
- Inkerman, Queensland, a town in Australia
- Inkerman, Renfrewshire, a mining hamlet in Scotland
- Inkerman, South Australia, a town in the Mid North of South Australia
- Inkerman Parish, New Brunswick, a community in Canada
  - Inkerman, New Brunswick, a community located within Inkerman Parish
- Inkerman, Ontario, a community located within North Dundas township
- Inkerman Senate division, one of the constitutionally-mandated Canadian Senate divisions in Quebec

== Events ==
- the Battle of Inkerman in the Crimean War

== Other ==
- Inkerman, a French minesweeper, built in 1918 by Canadian Car and Foundry, lost on her maiden voyage on Lake Superior
- Inkerman (horse), an American-bred Thoroughbred racehorse and sire of the late 1970s and 1980s
- Inkerman Sugar Mill in Queensland, Australia
