= Fleming Field =

Fleming Field may refer to:

- Fleming Field, County Durham, a village in County Durham, England, United Kingdom
- Fleming Field (Yonkers), a baseball stadium in Yonkers, New York, United States
- Fleming Field (Gainesville), the original home field of the University of Florida's football team
- South St. Paul Municipal Airport, also known as Fleming Field
