= Tiny Smith =

English footballer

Personal information
- Full name: John Smith
- Place of birth: Littletown, County Durham, England
- Height: 5 ft 2 in (1.57 m)
- Position: Inside right

Senior career*
Years	Team	Apps	(Gls)
- Sherburn Hill
- West Stanley
1932−1935	Barnsley	104	(26)
1935–1946	Plymouth Argyle	79	(9)
1944	→ Sheffield United (guest)	0	(0)
- * Club domestic league appearances and goals

John "Tiny" Smith was an English footballer who played as an inside right.

Born in Littletown, County Durham, Smith began his career playing non-league football with Sherburn Hill and then West Stanley before being signed by Barnsley in 1932. Smith made his football League debut for the Tykes on 1 October 1932 in a home fixture against Doncaster Rovers and played regularly for the following three seasons.

Plymouth Argyle signed Smith in the summer of 1935, and again he was a regular league player for his first two seasons, but then only playing sporadically in later years. Smith made one guest appearance for Sheffield United in 1944, Argyle having ceased playing during the Second World War, but retired soon after the end of hostilities having scored 35 goals in 185 Football league appearances, but remained as a scout for Plymouth for a period.
