= Preston-le-Skerne =

Coordinates: 54.610°N 1.528°W

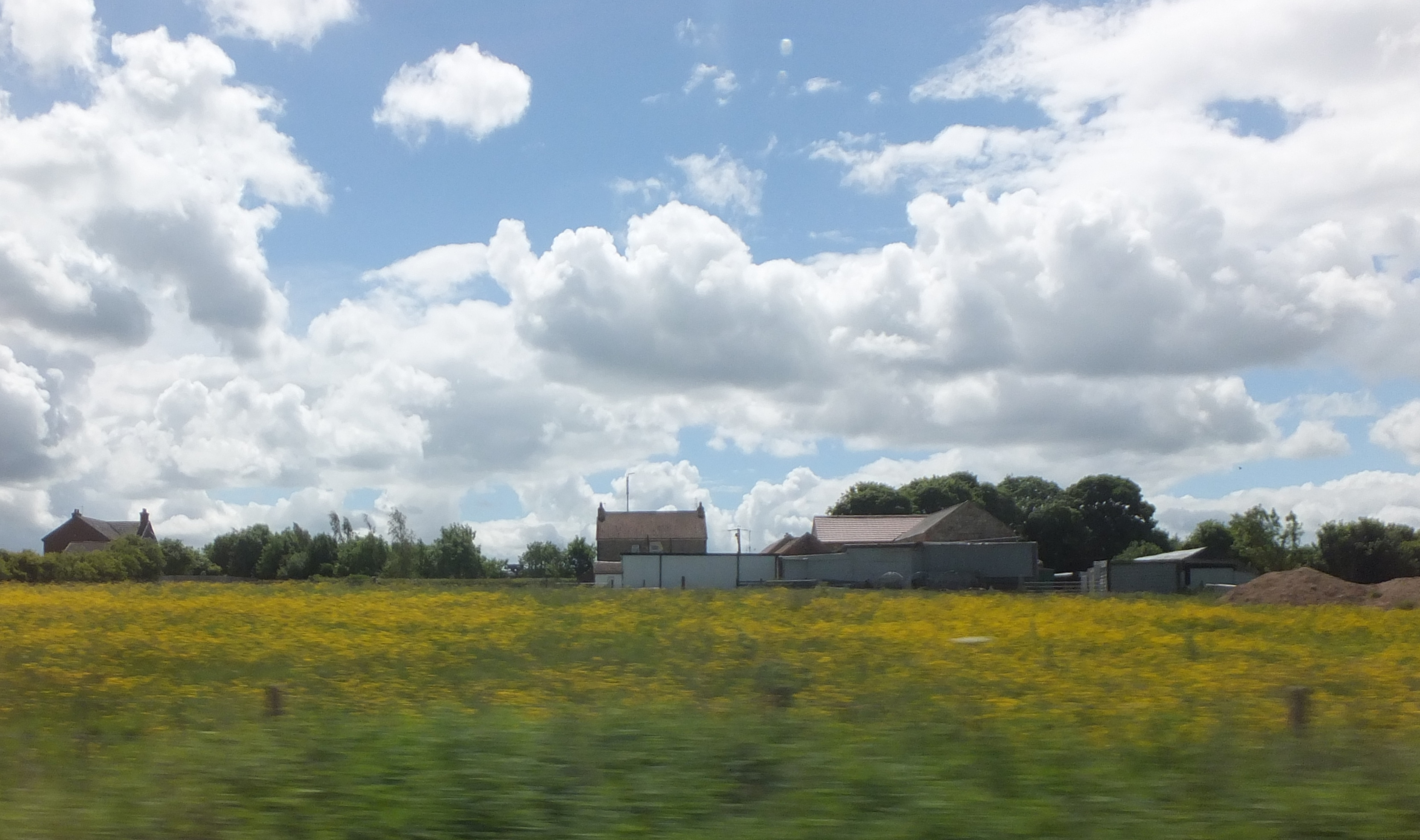
- Preston West Farm

- Location within County Durham
- OS grid reference: NZ305239
- Civil parish: Mordon
- Unitary authority: County Durham
- Region: North East
- Country: England
- Sovereign state: United Kingdom
- Post town: Newton Aycliffe
- Postcode district: DL5
- Dialling code: 01325
- Police: Durham
- Fire: County Durham and Darlington
- Ambulance: North East
- UK Parliament: Sedgefield

Preston-le-Skerne is a hamlet in the civil parish of Mordon, County Durham, England. It is situated a short distance to the east of Newton Aycliffe.

== History ==
Preston-le-Skerne was formerly a township in the parish of Aycliffe. In 1866, Preston le Skerne became a separate civil parish. On 1 April 1983 the parish was abolished and merged with Mordon. In 1971, the parish had a population of 81.
