= Evenwood, West Virginia =

Unincorporated community in West Virginia, United States

Evenwood
- Unincorporated community
- Location within the state of West Virginia Evenwood (the United States)
- Coordinates: 38°53′44″N 79°38′54″W
- Country: United States
- State: West Virginia
- County: Randolph
- Elevation: 2,625 ft (800 m)
- Time zone: UTC-5 (Eastern (EST))
  - Summer (DST): UTC-4 (EDT)
- GNIS ID: 1554419

Evenwood is an unincorporated community in Randolph County, West Virginia, United States.

The community was named after Evenwood, in England, the ancestral home of a local lumber dealer.
