= Jimmy Dickenson =

English footballer

Personal information
- Full name: James Dickenson
- Date of birth: 1908
- Place of birth: Pittington, England
- Date of death: 1982
- Positions: Left half; left back

Senior career*
Years	Team	Apps	(Gls)
- Murton Colliery Welfare
- Easington Colliery
1930	Hartlepools United	23	(1)
1931	Blackpool	0	(0)
1932–1933	Oldham Athletic	6	(0)
1934	Torquay United	18	(1)
- Scarborough
- Horden Colliery Welfare
- * Club domestic league appearances and goals

James Dickenson (1908–1982) was an English professional footballer. A left half or left back, he played in the Football League for Hartlepools United, Oldham Athletic and Torquay United.
