= Ramshaw, Bishop Auckland =

Village in County Durham, England

Coordinates: 54.630°N 1.770°W

Ramshaw
- Location within County Durham
- Population: 321
- OS grid reference: NZ149261
- Unitary authority: County Durham
- Ceremonial county: County Durham
- Region: North East
- Country: England
- Sovereign state: United Kingdom
- Post town: Bishop Auckland
- Postcode district: DL14
- Police: Durham
- Fire: County Durham and Darlington
- Ambulance: North East
- UK Parliament: Bishop Auckland

Ramshaw is a village in County Durham, in England. It is situated to the south-west of Bishop Auckland. As of 2025, the village had a population of approximately 321. Ramshaw was originally a mining village and is home to one restaurant, the Bridge Inn. The River Gaunless runs through Ramshaw. The name Gaunless itself is of later Norse origin, meaning useless. It is believed that this derives from the river's inability to power a mill, sustain fish or create fertile floodplains. The bridge connecting Ramshaw with neighbouring village Evenwood is between 300 and 500 years old.

== Landmarks ==
There is a formal garden in Ramshaw, named Ramshaw Hall Garden, which contains walls originating in the late 17th century.

== Education ==
There is a primary school, named Ramshaw Primary School, which educates students aged 4 to 11 years. As of 21 July 2023, it has 63 pupils.
