= Francis Barmby =

English cricketer

Personal information
- Full name: Francis James Barmby
- Born: 21 December 1863; Pittington, County Durham, England
- Died: 30 September 1936 (aged 72); Oxford, Oxfordshire, England
- Batting: Right-handed
- Bowling: Right-arm medium

Domestic team information
- Years: Team
- 1900 & 1909: Berkshire
- 1885: Oxford University

Career statistics
Competition	First-class
Matches	1
Runs scored	6
Batting average	3.00
100s/50s	–/–
Top score	6
Balls bowled	–
Wickets	–
Bowling average	–
5 wickets in innings	–
10 wickets in match	–
Best bowling	–
Catches/stumpings	1/–
- Source: Cricinfo, 22 November 2011

Francis James Barmby (21 December 1863 – 30 September 1936) was an English cricketer. Barmby was a right-handed batsman who bowled right-arm medium pace. The son of Rev. James Barmby, he was born at Pittington, County Durham, where his father was the Rector. He was later educated at Charterhouse School.

While studying at Magdalen College, Oxford, Barmby made a single first-class appearance for Oxford University Cricket Club against Lancashire at Old Trafford in 1885. During this match, he was dismissed for a duck by Alexander Watson in their first-innings, while in their second-innings he made 6 runs, before being dismissed by Johnny Briggs. This was his only first-class appearance for the university.

He later made two Minor Counties Championship appearances for Berkshire; in 1900 against Oxfordshire and in 1909 against Buckinghamshire.

In other sports, he won a Blue for Association football in 1886 and was also a good rackets player.

He became a schoolmaster and sub-warden at Radley College, the public school near Abingdon, Oxfordshire. He died on 30 September 1936 at Oxford.
