= Staindrop Academy =

Secondary school in County Durham, England

Location
- Cleatlam Lane; Staindrop; County Durham, DL2 3JU; England
- 54.57729°N 1.81208°W

Information
- Type: Academy
- Local authority: Durham County Council
- Trust: Advance Learning Partnership
- Department for Education URN: 144991 Tables
- Ofsted: Reports
- Headteacher: Kelvin Simpson
- Gender: Coeducational
- Age: 11 to 16
- Website: http://www.staindropacademy.com/

Staindrop Academy (formerly Staindrop School) is a coeducational secondary school located in Staindrop, County Durham, England.

Previously a community school administered by Durham County Council, Staindrop School converted to academy status in August 2011, and was later renamed Staindrop Academy. However the school continues to coordinate with Durham County Council for admissions.

Staindrop Academy offers GCSEs and BTECs as programmes of study for pupils.

== Notable former pupils ==
- Tony McMahon, footballer
