= Pittington Hill =

Site of Special Scientific Interest in County Durham, England

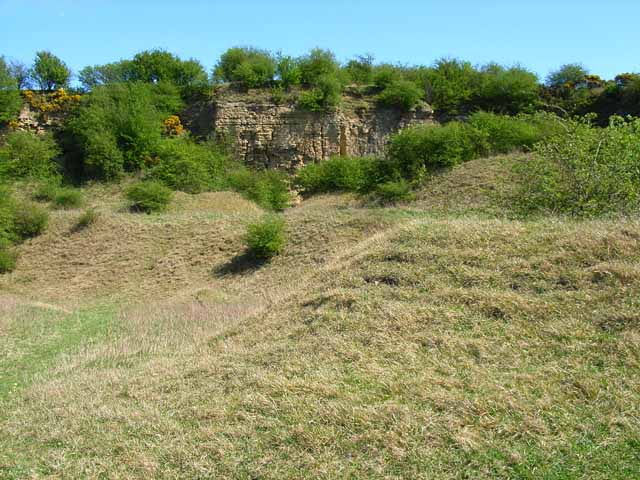
- Disused Pittington Quarry, now part of Pittington Hill SSSI

- Location within County Durham
- Location: MAGiC MaP
- Nearest city: City of Durham
- Coordinates: 54°47′45″N 1°29′15″W
- Area: 6.4 ha (16 acres)
- Established: 1987
- Governing body: Natural England
- Website: Pittington Hill SSSI

Pittington Hill is a Site of Special Scientific Interest in County Durham, England. It lies adjacent to the village of Pittington, some 6 km north-east of Durham city. A disused quarry occupies part of the site.

The hill slopes and former quarry support an extensive area of primary magnesian limestone grassland. Blue moor-grass, Sesleria albicans, a characteristic plant of such grassland, is present but not abundant in the primary grassland on the hill slopes, where herbs such as rock-rose, Helianthemum nummularium, are more common; blue moor-grass is more plentiful in the secondary grassland on the quarry floor and spoil heaps, where it is associated with species such as quaking grass, Briza media, salad burnet, Sanguisorba minor, and autumn gentian, Gentianella amarella.
