= Little Newsham =

Village in England

Coordinates: 54.556°N 1.811°W

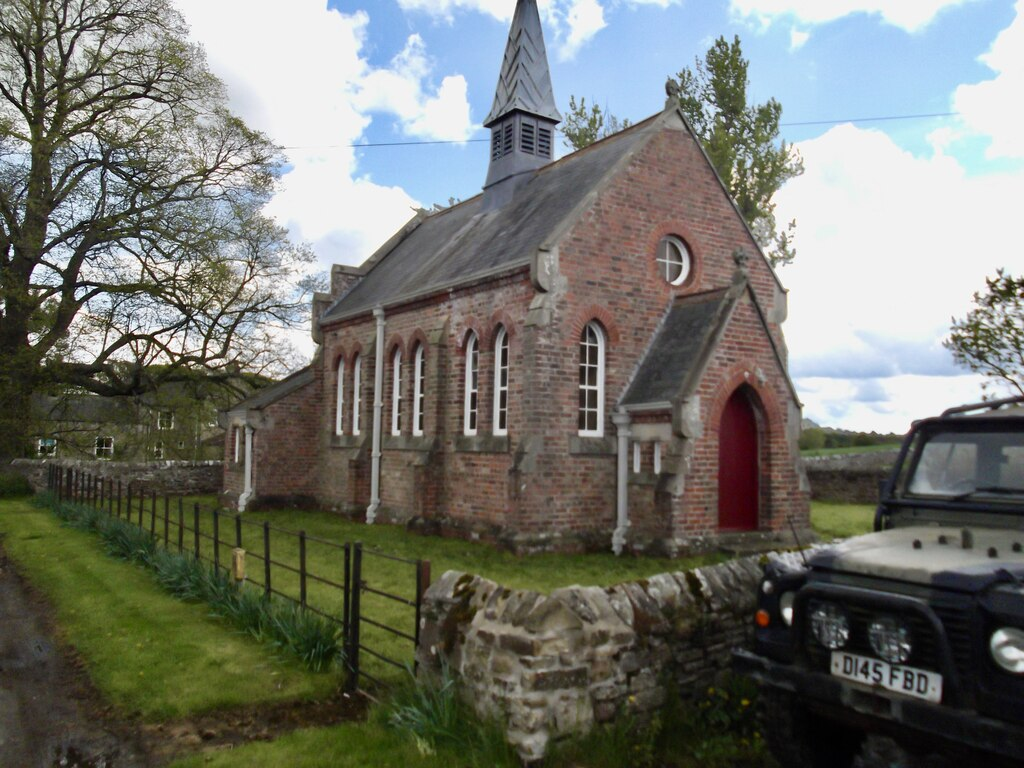
- Chapel

- Location within County Durham
- Civil parish: Winston
- Unitary authority: County Durham
- Ceremonial county: Durham
- Region: North East
- Country: England
- Sovereign state: United Kingdom
- Police: Durham
- Fire: County Durham and Darlington
- Ambulance: North East

Little Newsham is a hamlet in County Durham, England. It is part of Winston civil parish and lies to the north of Winston village, south of Staindrop, and a few miles east of Barnard Castle.

The hamlet is possibly of Saxon origin and was settled due to its nearby springs. Most of the hamlet, consisting of listed farm buildings and cottages, is a conservation area.

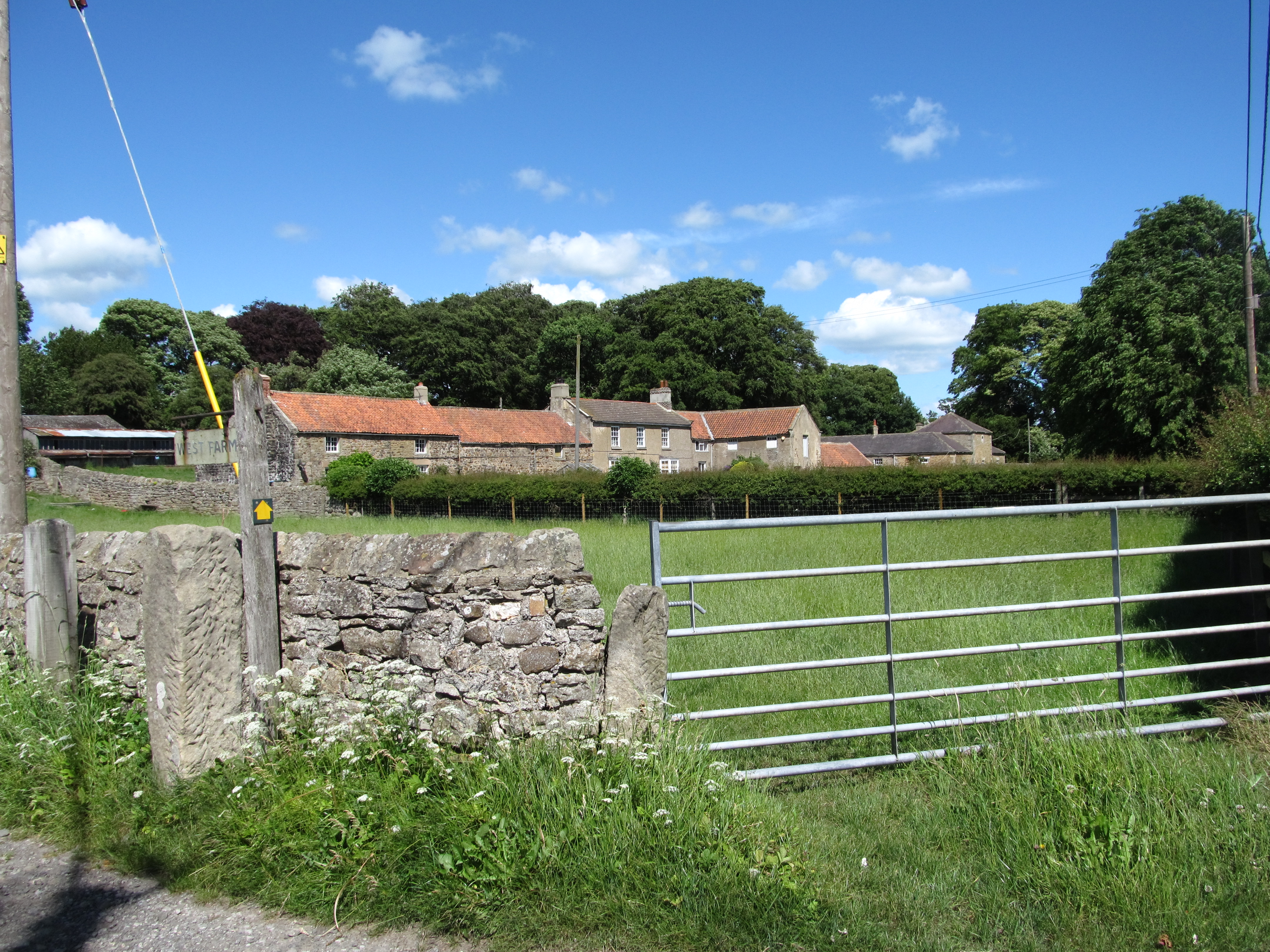
Cottages
