= Cleatlam =

Village in County Durham, England

Coordinates: 54.562°N 1.818°W

- Location within County Durham
- OS grid reference: NZ118186
- Unitary authority: County Durham
- Ceremonial county: County Durham
- Region: North East
- Country: England
- Sovereign state: United Kingdom
- Post town: DARLINGTON
- Postcode district: DL2
- Police: Durham
- Fire: County Durham and Darlington
- Ambulance: North East

Cleatlam is a small village and civil parish in County Durham, England. It lies south of the larger village of Staindrop. It lies approximately 11 miles (18 km) west of Darlington, which is its post town.

== History ==
Cleatlam was historically a township which straddled the three ancient parishes of Gainford, Staindrop and Winston. Such townships were converted into civil parishes in 1866.

== Governance ==
There is one main tier of local government covering Cleatlam, at unitary authority level: Durham County Council. The parish is too small to have a parish council, so it has a parish meeting instead.

== Demography ==
The population of the parish fell below the threshold to allow it to be separately reported at the 2011 and 2021 censuses, with its population being grouped with Staindrop's for statistical reporting purposes. At the 1971 census the population of the parish of Cleatlam had been 81.
