= Newton Ketton =

Hamlet in County Durham, England

Coordinates: 54.578°N 1.516°W

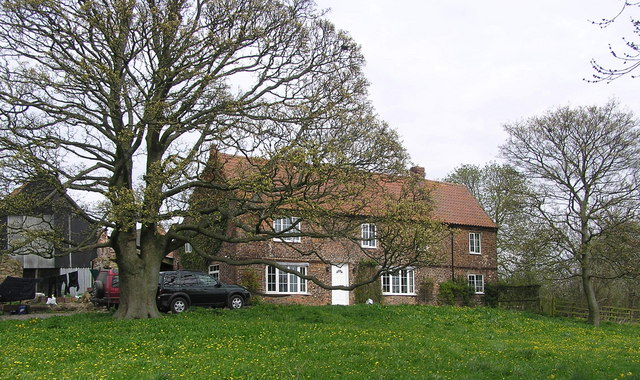
- A farm house in the village

- Location within County Durham
- Civil parish: Brafferton
- Unitary authority: Darlington
- Ceremonial county: Durham
- Region: North East
- Country: England
- Sovereign state: United Kingdom
- Police: Durham
- Fire: County Durham and Darlington
- Ambulance: North East

Newton Ketton is a hamlet in the civil parish of Brafferton, in the Darlington district, in County Durham, England, located to the north of Darlington.
