= Etchingwood =

Village in East Sussex, England

Coordinates: 50.982857°N 0.147523°E

- Location within East Sussex
- OS grid reference: TQ5084022578
- District: Wealden
- Shire county: East Sussex
- Region: South East
- Country: England
- Sovereign state: United Kingdom
- Post town: UCKFIELD
- Postcode district: TN22 4
- Dialling code: 01825
- Police: Sussex
- Fire: East Sussex
- Ambulance: South East Coast
- UK Parliament: Wealden

Etchingwood is a small cluster of mostly detached properties and farms within the civil parish of Buxted in the Wealden district of East Sussex, England. Its nearest town is Uckfield, which lies approximately 2.3 miles (3.7 km) south-west from the area, just off the A272 road. Framfield Road, Buxted and its namesake Etchingwood Lane both run through the area of Etchingwood, joining it to Hammonds Green to the South and Buxted to the North. The area has several public footpaths and bridleways running through it and there are long distant views of the South Downs National Park.

Etchingwood is an ancient Saxon settlement, possibly from the 6th or 7th centuries.
