= Hallgarth =

Village in County Durham, England

Coordinates: 54°47.2′N 1°29.4′W

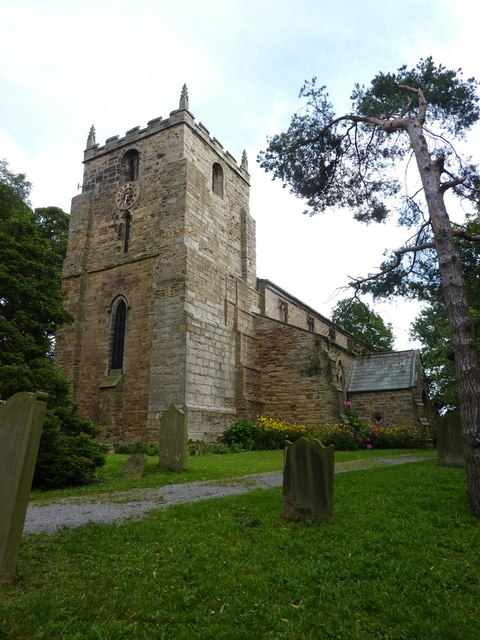
St. Laurence Church at Hallgarth

Hallgarth is a small village in County Durham, England, to the east of Durham. It is in the parish of Pittington and is described there.
