= Pittington =

Village and civil parish in County Durham, England

Coordinates: 54°48′N 1°29′W

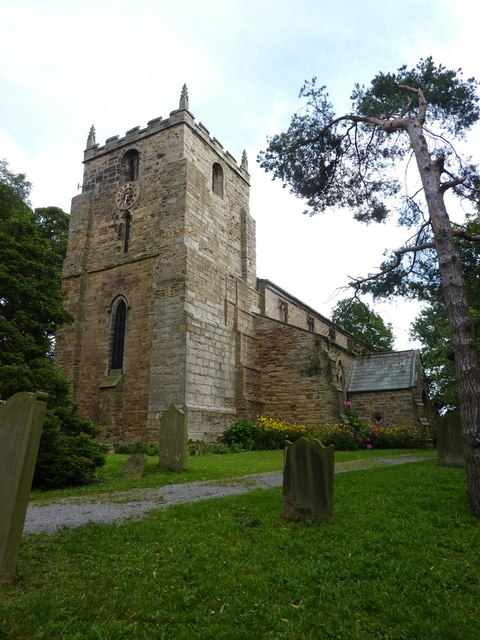
St Laurence's Church at Hallgarth

Pittington is a village and civil parish in County Durham, in England. It is situated a few miles north-east of Durham. The population as taken at the 2011 census was 2,534.

Pittington is made up of the neighbouring settlements of Low Pittington and High Pittington, which were developed for coal mining by Lambton Collieries from the 1820s. High Pittington, the larger of the two, now includes the old hamlet of Hallgarth. Hallgarth is a conservation area, designated in 1981. It is a small conservation area focussed on the Church of St Laurence, a Grade I listed building, and Hallgarth Manor Hotel (Grade II). The civil parish of Pittington includes both villages and the neighbouring village of Littletown.

Pittington Hill is a Site of Special Scientific Interest.

== Parish church ==
St Laurence's is a medieval parish church in the Diocese of Durham. It is dedicated to Saint Lawrence. The present building dates from around 1100, and is known for its 12th-century north arcade and wall-paintings. In a Victorian restoration by Ignatius Bonomi in 1846–7, the chancel was extended, and the aisle walls, porch and chancel were rebuilt. The church is a Grade I listed building.

The parish of Pittington is now part of a united benefice with St Mary Magdalene, Belmont, County Durham.

In the churchyard is a war memorial, unveiled in 1920. It is a calvary cross by Bowman and Sons, and designed by W. H. Wood. The memorial is Grade II listed.

== Education ==
Pittington Primary School is a school of approximately 180 pupils ranging from 3 to 11 years of age. The school logo is one hedgehog.

== The Hallgarth murder ==
The water mill, about half a mile to the south west of Hallgarth, was the scene of the 1830 murder of Mary Ann Westhorpe, a servant girl of about 17 years old.

Her body was discovered at 6 o'clock in the evening of Sunday 8 August 1830. While the mill owners, the miller Mr S. Oliver and his wife were at church, Thomas Clarke, a 19-year-old fellow servant, in a distressed state, alarmed residents of Sherburn with the information that six Irishmen had broken into the mill house at Hallgarth. He claimed that they had ransacked the house for money and then assaulted him with a poker before brutally murdering Westhorpe. Returning to the mill with the people he had informed, the girl's body was found in the kitchen with several brutal wounds including a cut to her throat from ear to ear from a breadknife, which had been preceded by severe skull wounds caused by a poker. It was found that money had been stolen from the household and that a whitewashed tool had been used to break into the drawers containing the money. It was then discovered that Clarke's room had recently been whitewashed, and in that room was found a blunt piece of metal which fitted the tool used in the robbery. It was realised that Clarke bore no signs of an attack upon him, and there were no sightings of the six men who he claimed had attacked them both.

Huge crowds turned out for Clarke's trial at Durham on Friday 25 February 1831, and despite Clarke's calm plea of innocence, he was found guilty. On Monday 28 February 1831 at midday he was hanged before a crowd of what has been estimated to be as high as 15,000 people. His last words were; "Gentlemen, I die for another man's crime – I am innocent".

A wall memorial spelling her name as Westrop was erected in St Laurence's Church.

The Hallgarth murder became the subject of a local broadside ballad; "Eighteen hundred three times ten, August the eighth that day, Let not that Sunday and that year, From memory pass away, At Hallgarth Mill near Pittington, Was done a murder foul, The female weak- the murderer strong, No pity for her soul. Her skull was broke, her throat was cut, Her struggle was soon o'er; And down she fell, and fetched a sigh, And weltered in her gore. Her fellow servant, Thomas Clarke, To Sherburn slowly sped, And told a tale that strangers six Had done the dreadful deed. Now, woe betide thee, Thomas Clarke! For this thy coward lie; A youth like thee for girl like her Would fight till he did die. "They've killed the lass," it was his tale," and nearly have killed me"; But when upon him folk did look, No bruises could they see."

== Notable people ==
- Francis Barmby – cricketer
- Jimmy Dickenson – professional footballer
- Harry Hooper (footballer, born 1933)
- Jack Percival (footballer, born 1913)
