= Etteridge =

Coordinates: 57.01046°N 4.15068°W

Etteridge: Scottish Gaelic: Eadrais
- Location within the Badenoch and Strathspey area
- OS grid reference: NN694930
- Council area: Highland
- Country: Scotland
- Sovereign state: United Kingdom
- Postcode district: PH20 1
- Police: Scotland
- Fire: Scottish
- Ambulance: Scottish

Etteridge (Scottish Gaelic: Eadrais) is a hamlet, situated close to Loch Etteridge in Inverness-shire, Scottish Highlands and is in the Scottish council area of Highland.

The main A9 road bypasses the hamlet.
