= West Rainton =

Coordinates: 54°48′50″N 1°29′49″W

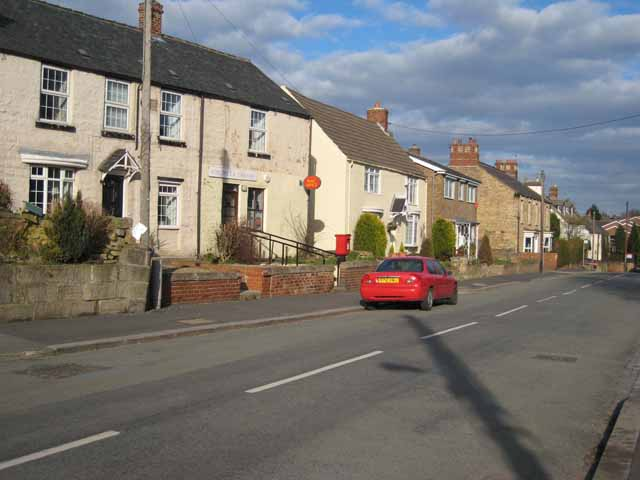
- Former Post Office, West Rainton

- Location within County Durham
- Population: 2,316 (2011 Census)
- OS grid reference: NZ3246
- Civil parish: West Rainton and Leamside
- Unitary authority: County Durham
- Ceremonial county: County Durham
- Region: North East
- Country: England
- Sovereign state: United Kingdom
- Post town: HOUGHTON LE SPRING
- Postcode district: DH4
- Dialling code: 0191
- Police: Durham
- Fire: County Durham and Darlington
- Ambulance: North East
- UK Parliament: City of Durham

West Rainton is a village in the civil parish of West Rainton and Leamside, in County Durham, England. It is situated between Durham and Houghton-le-Spring. Leamside is about one-half mile (0.80 km) to the west, and the south-western end of the village is known by the separate name of Rainton Gate. The village straddles a ridge parallel to the A690 with extensive views to the west. At the 2001 census it had a population of 2,255, increasing to 2,316 at the 2011 Census.

== History ==
The naming of the township was after one of the seven monks who followed the body of St Cuthbert from Lindisfarne to Durham. Spellings of this name Reingwald have included Reynington, Reynoton, Reynton, and Rayntona. The area belonged to the Prior and convent of Durham and was densely wooded, a park keeper being recorded as appointed in 1338. In 1657 Richard Marshall assigned a tenement and farm holding in West Rainton to Marmaduke Allenson. It then passed into the hands of West Rainton's more famous son – Sir John Duck, 1st Baronet – a Dick Whittington of the North East of England. He owned and built Rainton Hall around the year 1688.

The following is from History, Topography and Directory of Durham, Whellan, London, 1894; "The village of West Rainton is about four miles north-east of Durham, and formerly contained an ancient chapel with chantry dedicated to the Virgin Mary; some of the old stones may be seen in the different buildings in the village. The Old Hall, situated in the centre of the village, was built about 1690, by Sir Jno. Buck, [sic] now in a state of dilapidation, and let in tenements occupied by pitmen. There is a library, reading, and news-room here. There are two batteries of the Second Durham Artillery Volunteers, having a drill-hall here, built by the Marquess of Londonderry in 1880, the headquarters being at Seaham Harbour."

== St Mary's Church ==
Saint Mary's church built 1864 has a 130-foot (39.6 m) spire added in 1877 that is a prominent feature of the area visible for many miles. The spire was gifted by Sir George Elliot, 1st Baronet in memory of his daughter Elizabeth. A large granite tablet was used to record this donation and was of special interest being taken from the Great Pyramid of Giza, obtained in 1876 with the permission of the Egyptian Khedive, Isma'il Pasha; Elliot was a financial adviser to the Khedive. The church is a substantial Grade II* listed building, able to seat 500 worshippers. It contains a reredos by Antonio Salviati. Previously an ancient chapel stood nearby.

== Coal mining ==
Coal mining in the area is mentioned as early as the 12th century. In Whellan's 1894 Directory of County Durham some 1185 men and boys were employed in the Adventure, Alexandrina and Meadow pits sunk between 1817 and 1824. The coals produced were Londonderry Wallsend, Pittington Wallsend, and Londonderry Primrose, for household purposes, and the Hartley for steam purposes. The "Adventure" pit employed 389 people at its peak in 1940. Much of the newer housing in the village dates from the 1950s and was built to house the workforce for the pit as there was little other employment available locally. Although no "disasters", (i.e. pit accidents resulting in five or more deaths) were reported at Adventure, 23 lost their lives there. The pit was closed in 1978.

Nearby, the Leamside line railway, now disused, is still in place.

== Local facilities ==
A mile to the west can be found the remains of Finchale Priory, sacked by Henry VIII during the Dissolution of the Monasteries.

To the south, in a wooded area, is land owned by the Moor House scouts’ group. It is a 15-acre (6.1 ha) site providing accommodation and adventure challenges, and sleeps up to 38 youngsters.

== Gallery ==
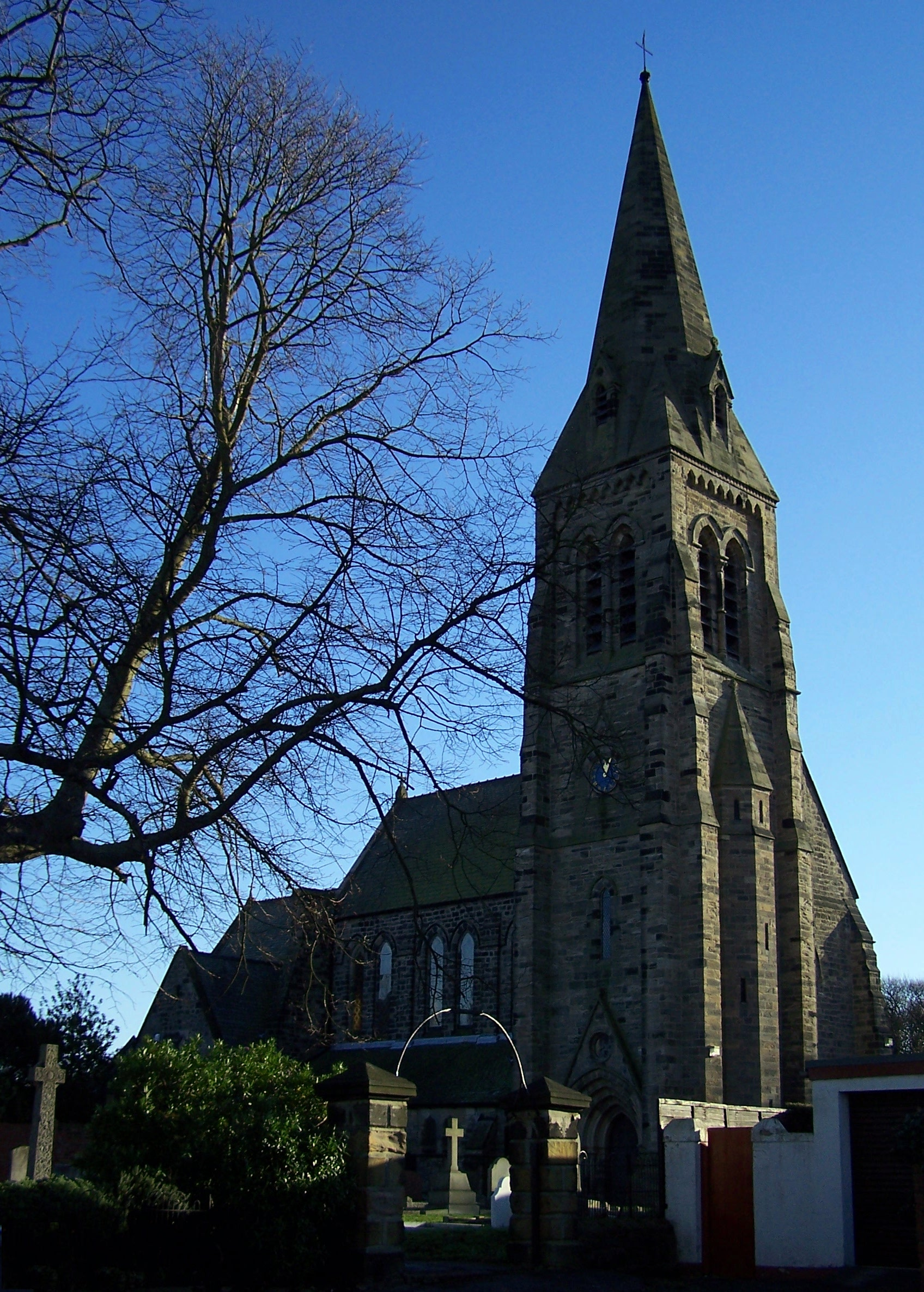
St Mary's church

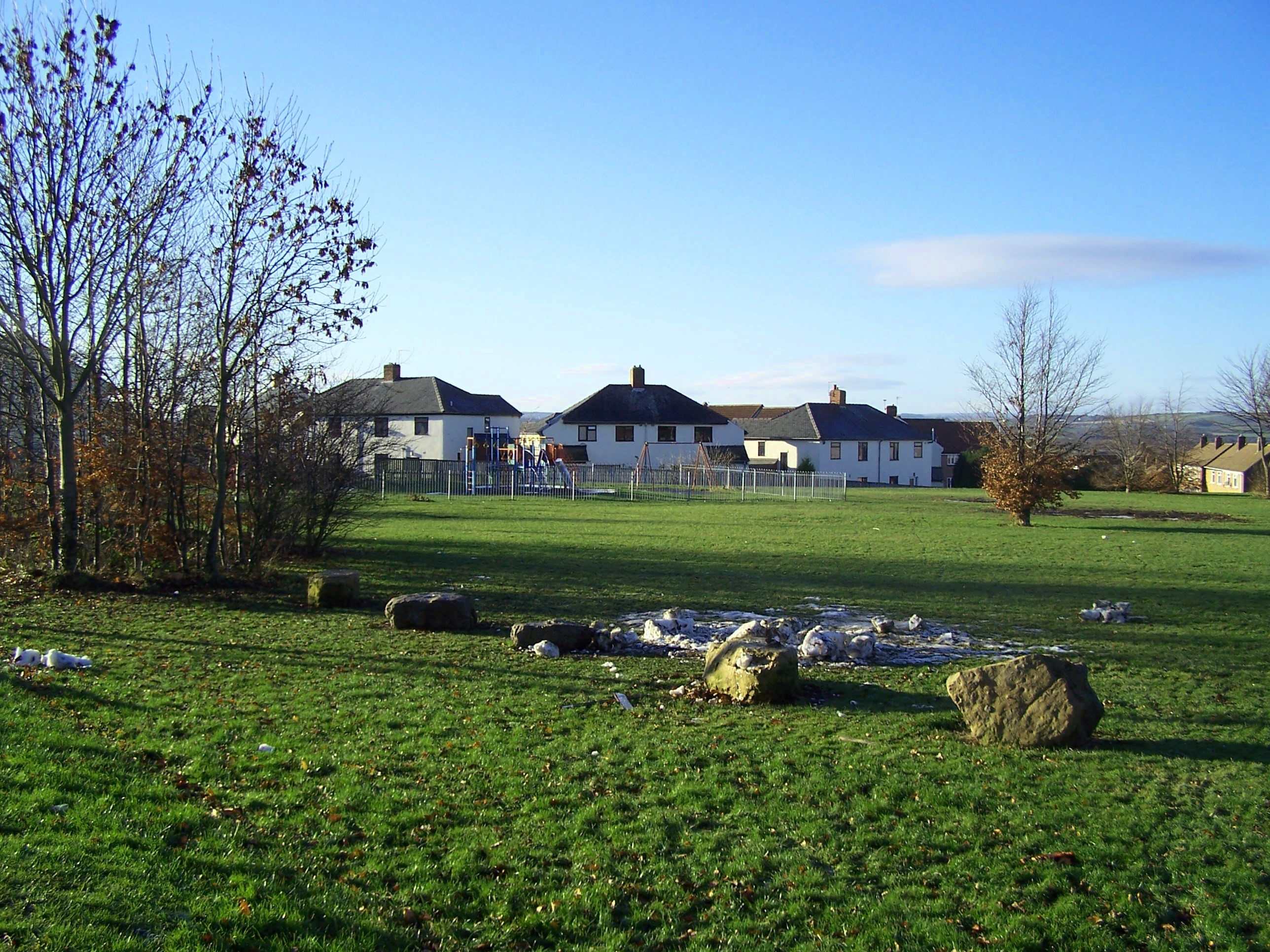
The Common, locally named 'The Rec'

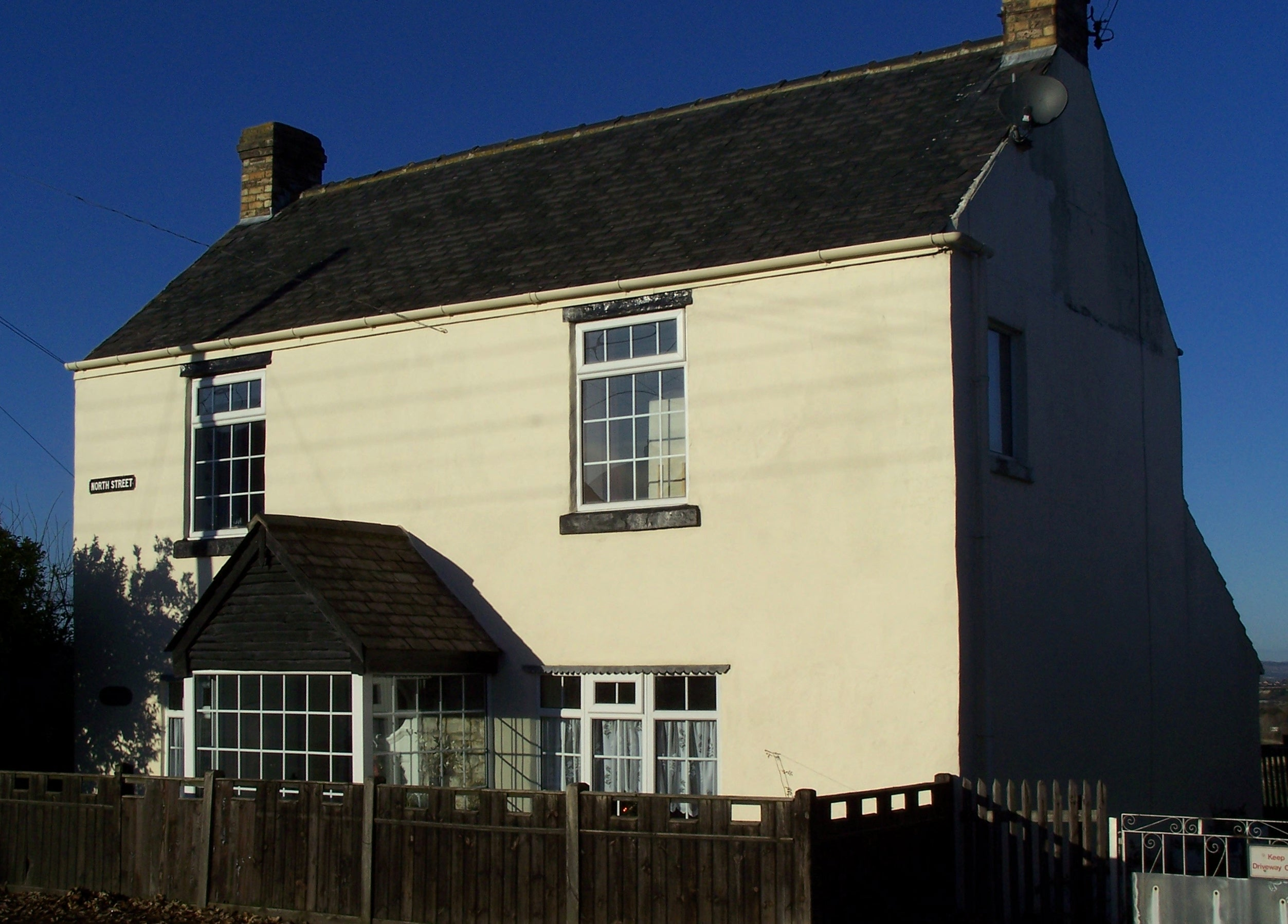
North Street Cottage

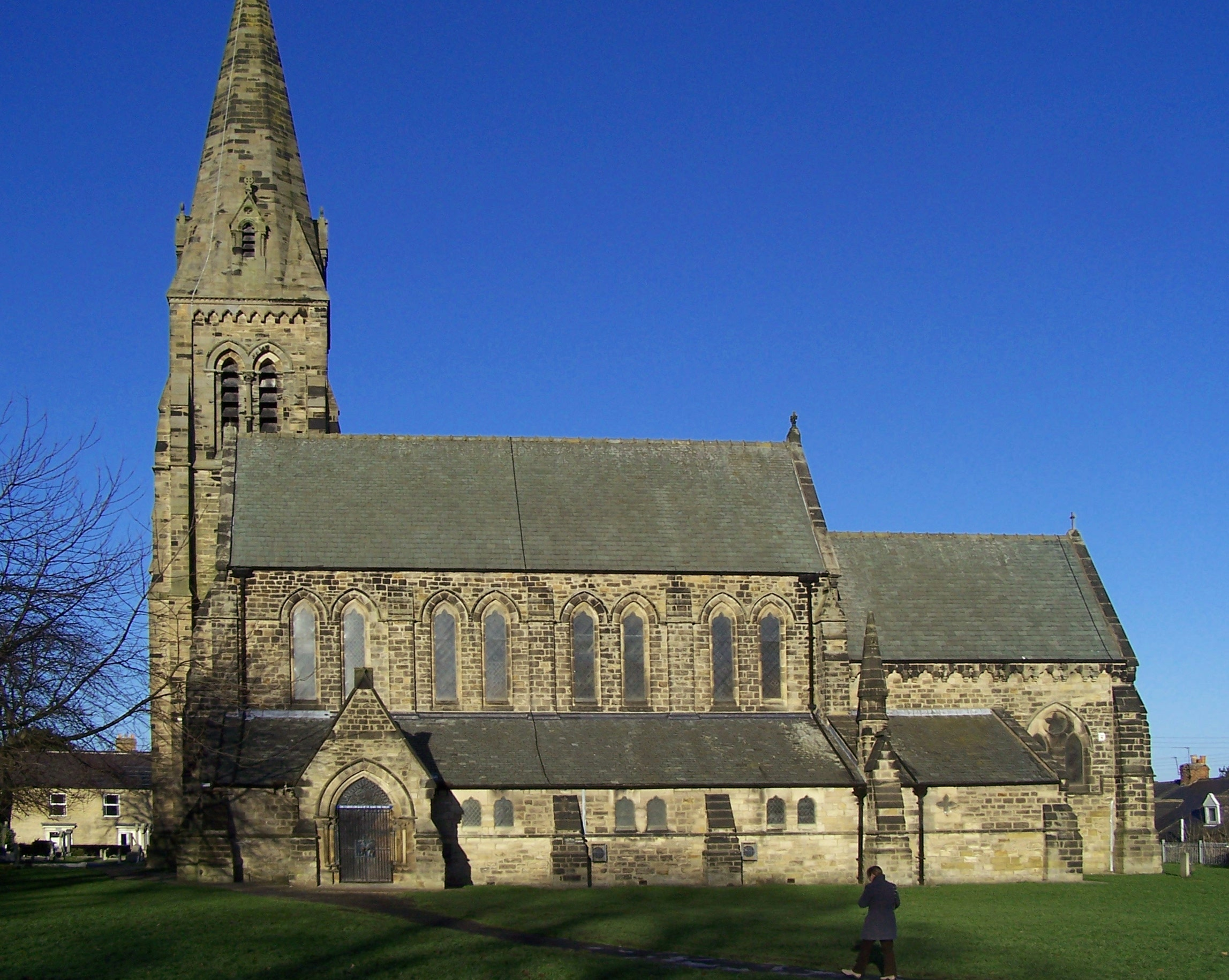
St Mary's church from the south

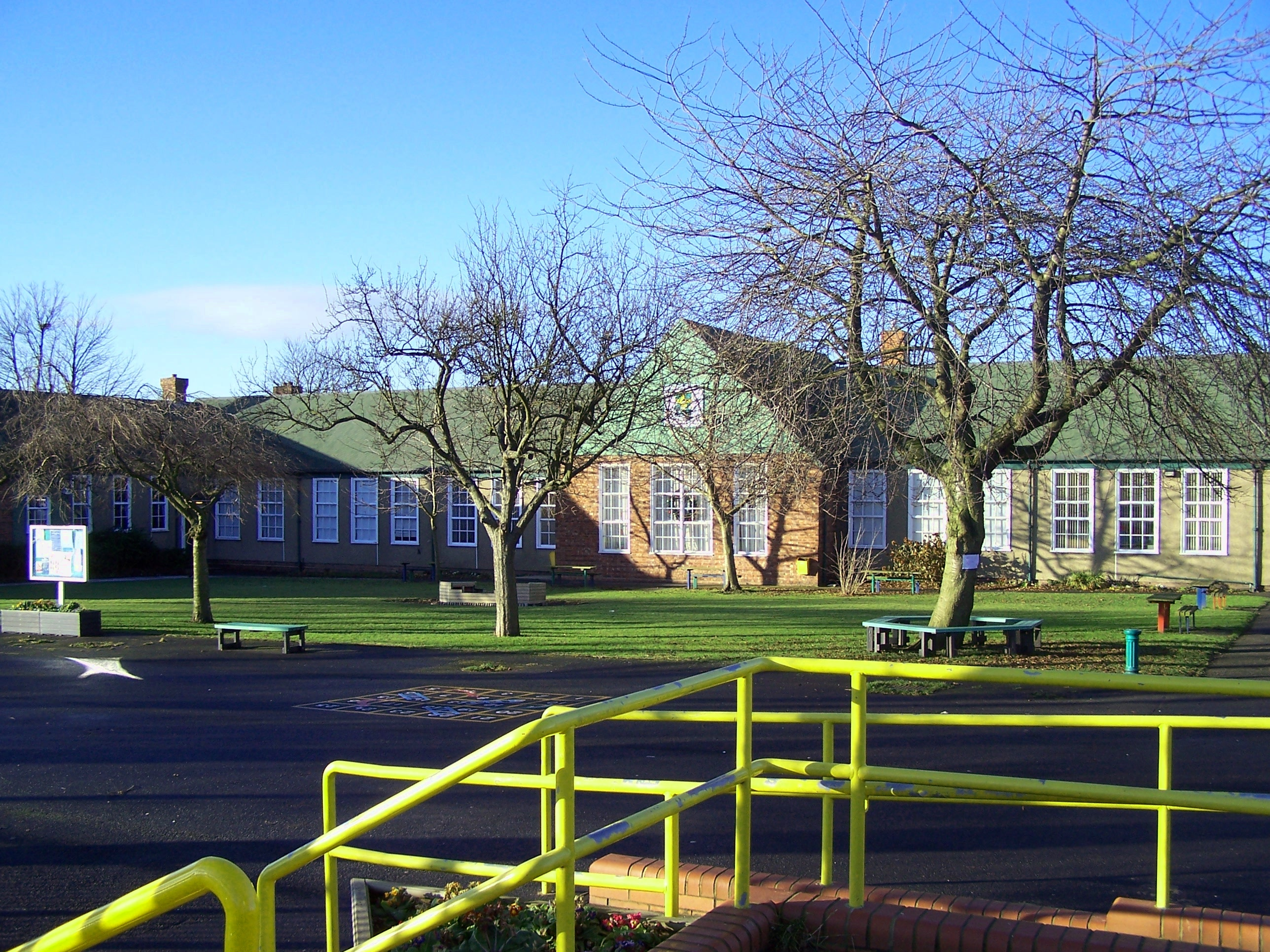
West Rainton Primary School

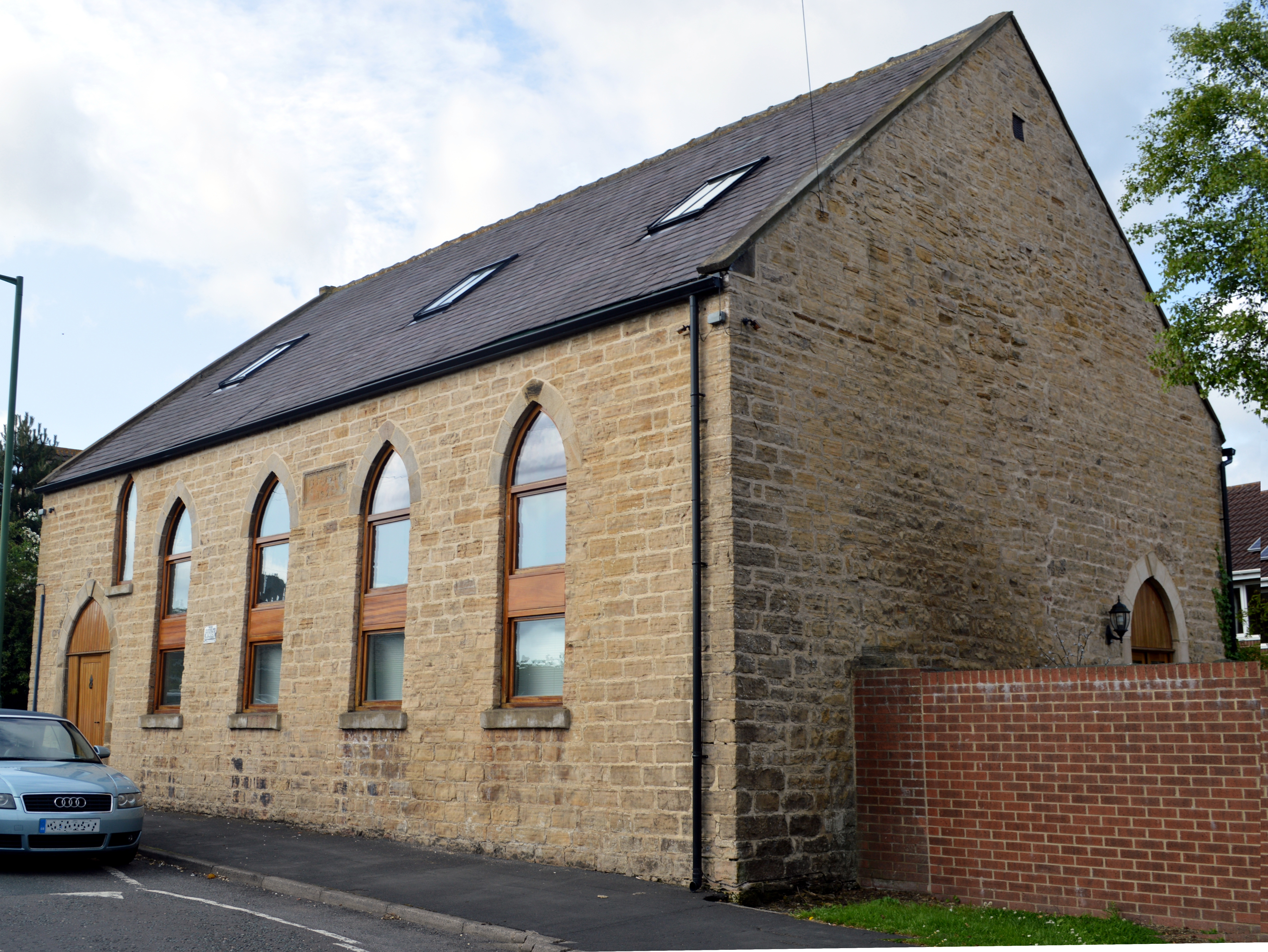
Former chapel on Hall Lane, now a private residence. The stone reads "Ebenezer 1922"

== Parish Council Web Site ==
- http://parishes.durham.gov.uk/westraintonleamside/Pages/default.aspx
