= Esperley Lane Ends =

Village in County Durham, England

Coordinates: 54.614°N 1.791°W

- Location within County Durham
- OS grid reference: NZ136243
- Unitary authority: County Durham
- Ceremonial county: County Durham
- Region: North East
- Country: England
- Sovereign state: United Kingdom
- Post town: DARLINGTON
- Postcode district: DL13
- Police: Durham
- Fire: County Durham and Darlington
- Ambulance: North East

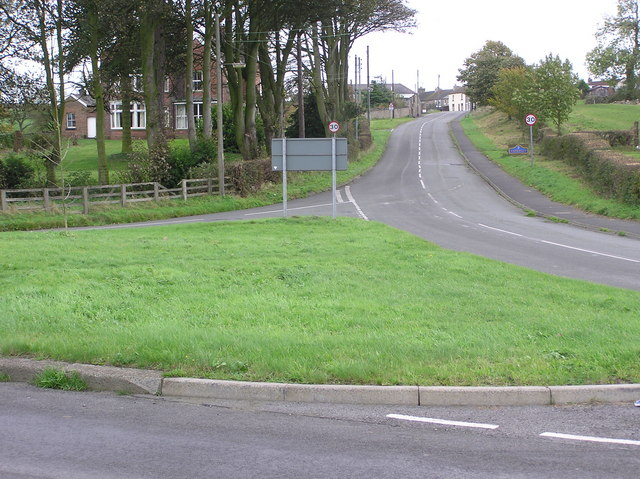

Esperley Lane Ends is a village in County Durham, in England. It is situated a few miles to the north west of Darlington, between Cockfield and Evenwood.
