= Winston, County Durham =

Village in County Durham, England

Coordinates: 54.54572°N 1.78419°W

Winston
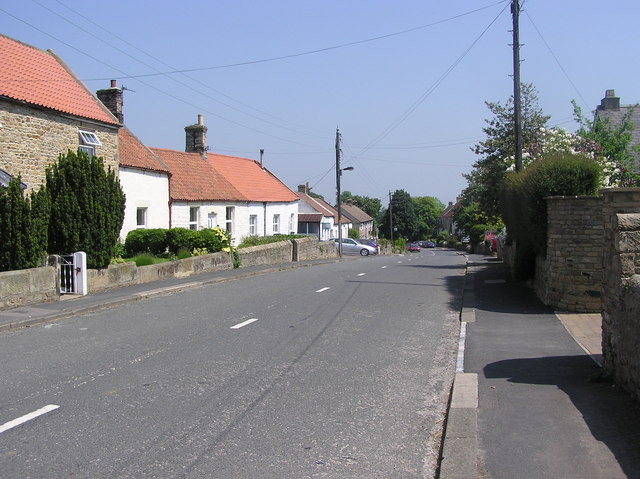
- A village street in Winston

- Location within County Durham
- Population: 431 (Including Wakerfield.2011)
- OS grid reference: NZ140167
- Unitary authority: County Durham
- Ceremonial county: County Durham
- Region: North East
- Country: England
- Sovereign state: United Kingdom
- Post town: Darlington
- Postcode district: DL2
- Police: Durham
- Fire: County Durham and Darlington
- Ambulance: North East
- UK Parliament: Bishop Auckland

Winston is a village and civil parish in County Durham, England. It is situated approximately 6 miles (9.7 km) east of Barnard Castle, on a crossroads between the A67 and B6274 roads. According to the 2011 UK Census the population was 431, the parish includes the hamlets of Little Newsham and South Cleatlam.

== History ==
In 1870-72 John Marius Wilson's Imperial Gazetteer of England and Wales described Winston as:

A parish, with W. village and Newsham hamlet, in Teesdale district, Durham; on the river Tees, and on the Barnard-Castle and South Durham railway, 6 miles E of Barnard-Castle. It has a post-office under Darlington, a r. station, and a one-arched bridge of 111 feet in span built in 1764. Acres, 2,961. Real property, £3,290. Pop., 342. Houses, 60. The property is subdivided. The living is a rectory in the diocese of Durham. Value, £534.* Patron, the Bishop of D. The church was rebuilt in 1849. There is a parochial school. Bishop Burgess was a resident.

Winston had a railway station that was first opened in 1856 as part of the Darlington and Barnard Castle Railway, it closed to passengers in 1964 and to freight in 1965 as part of the Beeching cuts, the station building was demolished in 2002, however the goods shed and station master's house still stand.

Near to the station was Westholme Colliery, which employed 87 miners at its peak around the time of the beginning of the First World War, the miner's cottages in the hamlet of South Cleatlam are still evident and now stand as modern residences. After the closure of Westholme in 1914, efforts were turned to two new collieries in the form of Teesside and North Tees. The Teesside colliery closed in August 1938, and North Tees in January 1966, before closure North Tees employed 60 men.

=== Winston Bridge ===
Winston Bridge was opened in 1763 over the River Tees for the transport of coal via what is now the B6274 road from Staindrop, south to Richmond. The hamlet of Winston Gate on the south side of the bridge was the location of the former barriers and toll booths. Designed by Sir Thomas Robinson, who had also designed the nearby Rokeby Hall, it once held claim to having the longest single span arch of any bridge in Europe, at 111 feet (34 m). In July 1988, the bridge was used in the filming of the television serial Piece of Cake, where a Spitfire flew under the bridge piloted by Ray Hanna, a founding member of the RAF Red Arrows aerobatic display team.

== Governance ==
Winston was part of the local government district of Teesdale from 1974 before it was abolished as part of the 2009 structural changes to local government in England. For the purposes of Durham County Council elections, Winston is located in the Barnard Castle East ward.

The village lies within the Bishop Auckland parliamentary constituency.

== Community and culture ==
The Anglican St. Andrew's Church, a grade I listed building, dates back to the 13th century, although it went under extensive restoration in 1848. The village was also home to a Methodist chapel, opened in 1902 and holding its final service in September 2016.

Winston once had a Church of England school that was built in 1851, however in 1961 it was closed, and the building was sold to Hammonds, a Darlington based brewery, it then became village's public house, now known as The Bridgewater Arms.

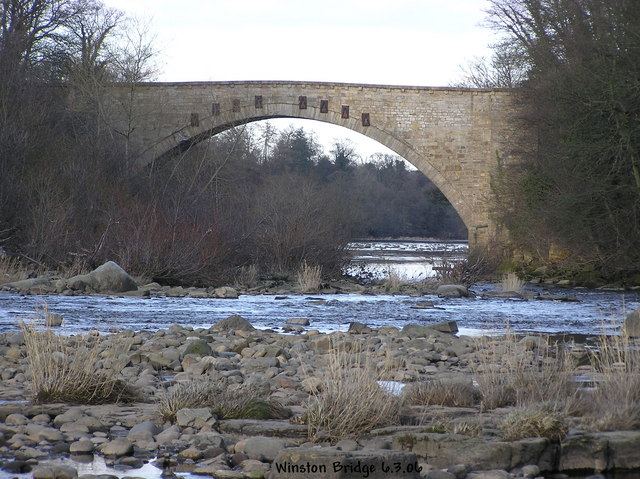
Winston Bridge from the South

== Notable people ==
- Birthplace of Thomas Wharton (anatomist), on 31 August 1614
- Birthplace of Aaron Arrowsmith, cartographer
