= Morley, County Durham =

Village in County Durham, United Kingdom

Coordinates: 54.628°N 1.844°W

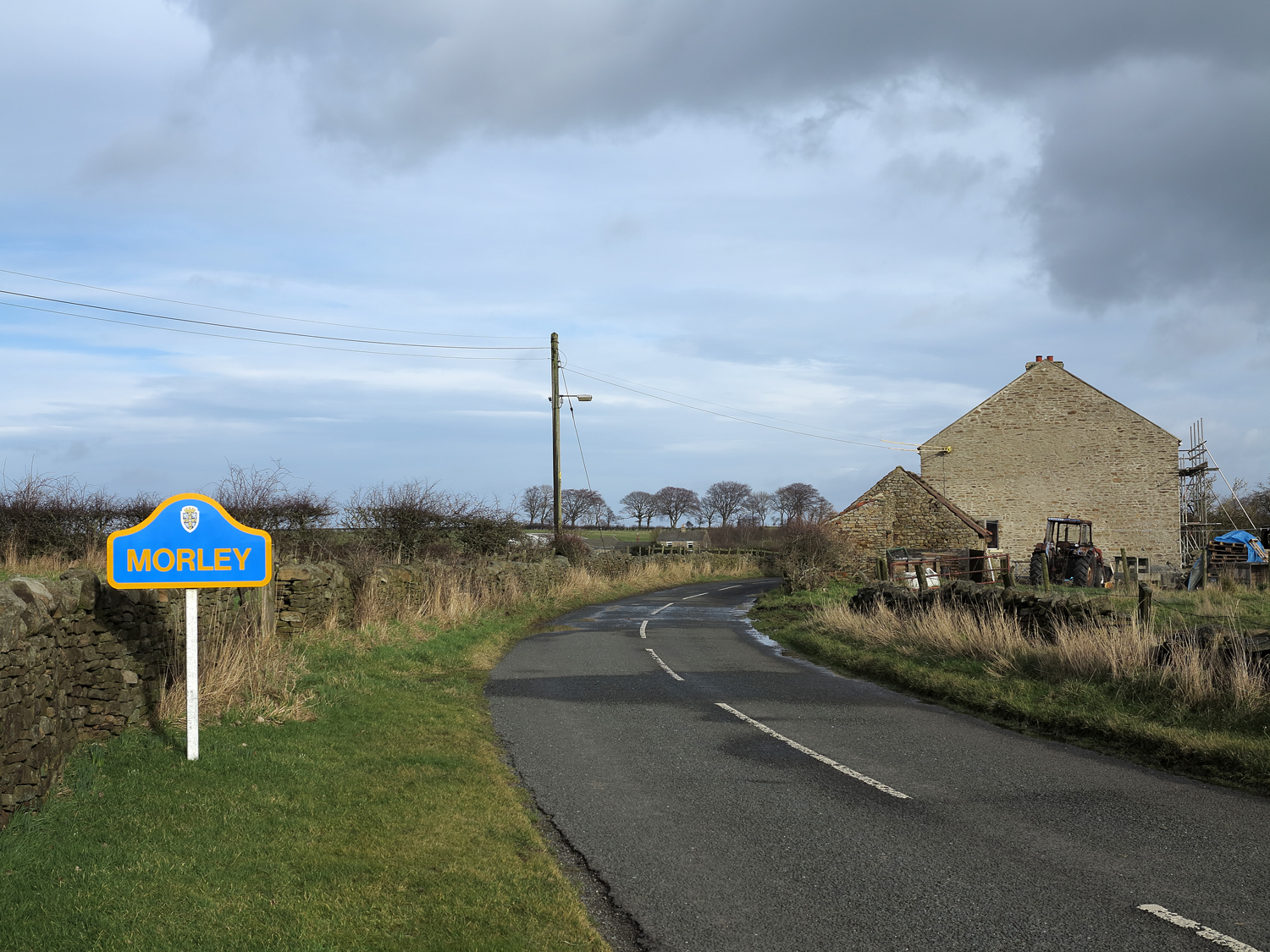
Entering Morley

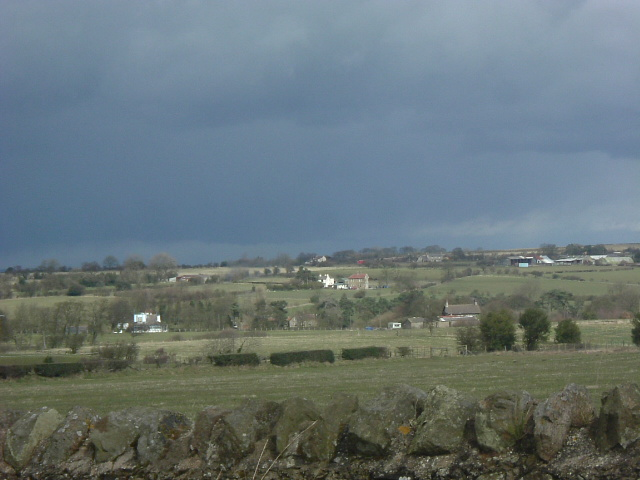
Looking west

Morley is a village in County Durham, England. It is situated five miles to the west of Bishop Auckland (OS grid reference NZ 1127). Morley is first mentioned in 1295, already with its present spelling; its coal mine was mentioned, as Morleypitte already in c. 1440. The name probably means "open ground by a moor", from Old English mōr "moor, clearing, pasture" + lẽah "open ground, clearing".
