= Enniscaven =

Hamlet in Cornwall, England

Coordinates: 50.398°N 4.864°W

Enniscaven: Cornish: Enysskawen
- Location within Cornwall
- OS grid reference: SW965593
- Unitary authority: Cornwall
- Ceremonial county: Cornwall
- Region: South West
- Country: England
- Sovereign state: United Kingdom
- Post town: ST AUSTELL
- Postcode district: PL26
- Dialling code: 01726
- Police: Devon and Cornwall
- Fire: Cornwall
- Ambulance: South Western
- UK Parliament: St Austell and Newquay

Enniscaven (Cornish: Enysskawen, meaning isolated place of a single elder tree) is a hamlet that lies 5 miles (8.0 km) north-west of St Austell in Cornwall, England. Enniscaven is in the civil parish of St Dennis. The village is near to Goss Moor which is the largest continuous mire complex in south-west Britain. Goss Moor is part of the Goss And Tregoss Moors Site of Special Scientific Interest (SSSI) which is also a Special Area of Conservation (SAC).
