= Eversley Centre =

Village in Hampshire, England

Coordinates: 51.348550°N 0.87222°W

- Location within Hampshire
- OS grid reference: SU7863961656
- District: Hart
- Shire county: Hampshire
- Region: South East
- Country: England
- Sovereign state: United Kingdom
- Post town: Hook
- Postcode district: RG27
- Police: Hampshire and Isle of Wight
- Fire: Hampshire and Isle of Wight
- Ambulance: South Central
- UK Parliament: North East Hampshire

Eversley Centre is a village in the Hart District of Hampshire, England. Its nearest town is Yateley, approximately 2 miles (2.5 km) away from the village. It is in the civil parish of Eversley.
