= Rainton Gate =

Village in County Durham, England

Coordinates: 54.811°N 1.501°W

- Location within County Durham
- OS grid reference: NZ321463
- Unitary authority: County Durham
- Ceremonial county: County Durham
- Region: North East
- Country: England
- Sovereign state: United Kingdom
- Post town: Durham
- Postcode district: DH4
- Police: Durham
- Fire: County Durham and Darlington
- Ambulance: North East

Rainton Gate is a village in County Durham, England. It is situated between Durham and Houghton-le-Spring, next to West Rainton.
