= Eworthy =

Hamlet in Devon, England

Coordinates: 50°44′01″N 4°12′05″W

Eworthy is a hamlet in Devon, England. It is situated close to Germansweek. There is a Methodist chapel in the hamlet.
