= Evenwood Gate =

Village in County Durham, England

Coordinates: 54.6129°N 1.7500°W

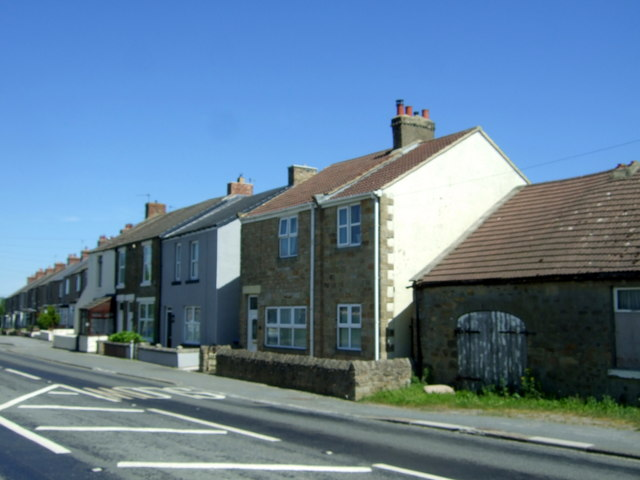
The A688

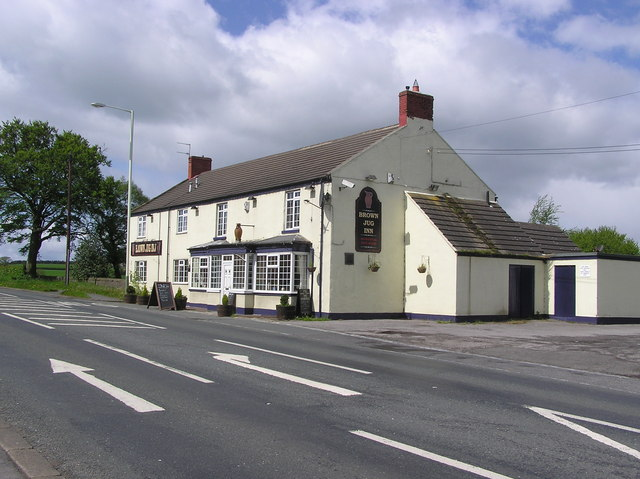
The former Brown Jug Inn (2006)

Evenwood Gate is a small village in County Durham, England. It is situated to the south west of Bishop Auckland, close to Evenwood.
