= List of settlements in County Durham by population =

This is a list of settlements in County Durham by population based on the results of the 2011 census. The next United Kingdom census will take place in 2021. In 2011, there were 26 built-up area subdivisions with 5,000 or more inhabitants in County Durham, shown in the table below. This list does not include areas transferred from County Durham to Tyne and Wear in 1974, including Gateshead and Sunderland, which would both be larger than the current largest settlement of Darlington.

== Population ranking ==
The 11 largest settlements of County Durham. The city of Durham in bold and council centres in yellow.
The 12th to 20th largest settlements in County Durham. Egglescliffe and Eaglescliffe are interchangeably used. Peterlee and Horden are counted separately in 2021 and together in previous censuses.
The 21st to 26th largest settlements in County Durham, Easington and Easington Colliery are counted as just Easington in the 2021 census. Pelton and Ouston are counted together in 2021 and separate in previous censuses

#	Settlement	Council area	Population		
#	Settlement	Council area	2001	2011	2021
1	**Darlington**	Darlington	86,460	92,363	93,015
2	**Hartlepool**	Hartlepool	86,030	88,855	87,995
3	**Stockton-on-Tees**	Stockton (North Tees)	80,060	82,729	84,815
4	**Durham**	Co. Durham	43,220	47,785	50,510
5	**Billingham**	Stockton (North Tees)	34,760	35,392	33,920
6	**Consett**	Co. Durham	21,060	24,828	29,885
7	**Newton Aycliffe**	Co. Durham	25,660	25,964	25,765
8	**Chester-le-Street**	Co. Durham	23,946	24,277	23,560
9	**Bishop Auckland**	Co. Durham	23,830	24,908	23,355
10	**Seaham**	Co. Durham	21,160	22,373	21,665
11	**Spennymoor**	Co. Durham	17,270	17,766	20,410
12	**Peterlee** & **Horden**	Co. Durham	29,936	27,871	19,750; 6,805
13	**Stanley**	Co. Durham	19,455	20,995	19,415
14	**Egglescliffe/ Eaglescliffe**	Stockton (North Tees)	7,908^{†}	8,559^{†}	10,250
15	**Crook**	Co. Durham	8,540	10,019	9,715
16	**Shildon**	Co. Durham	10,080	9,976	9,645
17	**Brandon**	Co. Durham	9,082	9,566	9,505
18	**Ferryhill**	Co. Durham	10,554	9,805	8,860
19	**Annfield Plain**	Co. Durham	9,824	7,774	7,785
20	**Murton**	Co. Durham	6,820	7,413	7,240
21	**Easington & Easington Colliery**	Co. Durham	7,123	7,193	6,965
22	**Barnard Castle**	Co. Durham	6,720	7,040	5,785
23	**Willington**	Co. Durham	6,105	6,633	5,685
24	**Pelton** & **Ouston**	Co. Durham	5,249; 5,490	5,278; 5,303	7,305
25	**Sacriston**	Co. Durham	4,394	4,611	5,190
26	**Wingate**	Co. Durham	4,660	5,134	5,035
27	**Castleside**	Co. Durham	4,480	4,881	N/a
28	**Blackhall Colliery**	Co. Durham	5,223	4,785	N/a
30	**Langley Park**	Co. Durham	4,529	4,545	N/a

† - Parish count

== See also ==
- County Durham
- List of civil parishes in County Durham
- List of settlements in Northumberland by population
- List of settlements in Tyne and Wear by population
- List of towns and cities in England by population
