= Etherley Dene =

Village in County Durham, England

Coordinates: 54.650°N 1.704°W

- Location within County Durham
- OS grid reference: NZ192283
- Unitary authority: County Durham
- Ceremonial county: County Durham
- Region: North East
- Country: England
- Sovereign state: United Kingdom
- Post town: DARLINGTON
- Postcode district: DL14
- Police: Durham
- Fire: County Durham and Darlington
- Ambulance: North East

Etherley Dene is a village in County Durham, in England. It is situated to the west of Bishop Auckland.
