= Fleming Field, County Durham =

Hamlet in County Durham, England

Coordinates: 54.765°N 1.400°W

Fleming Field
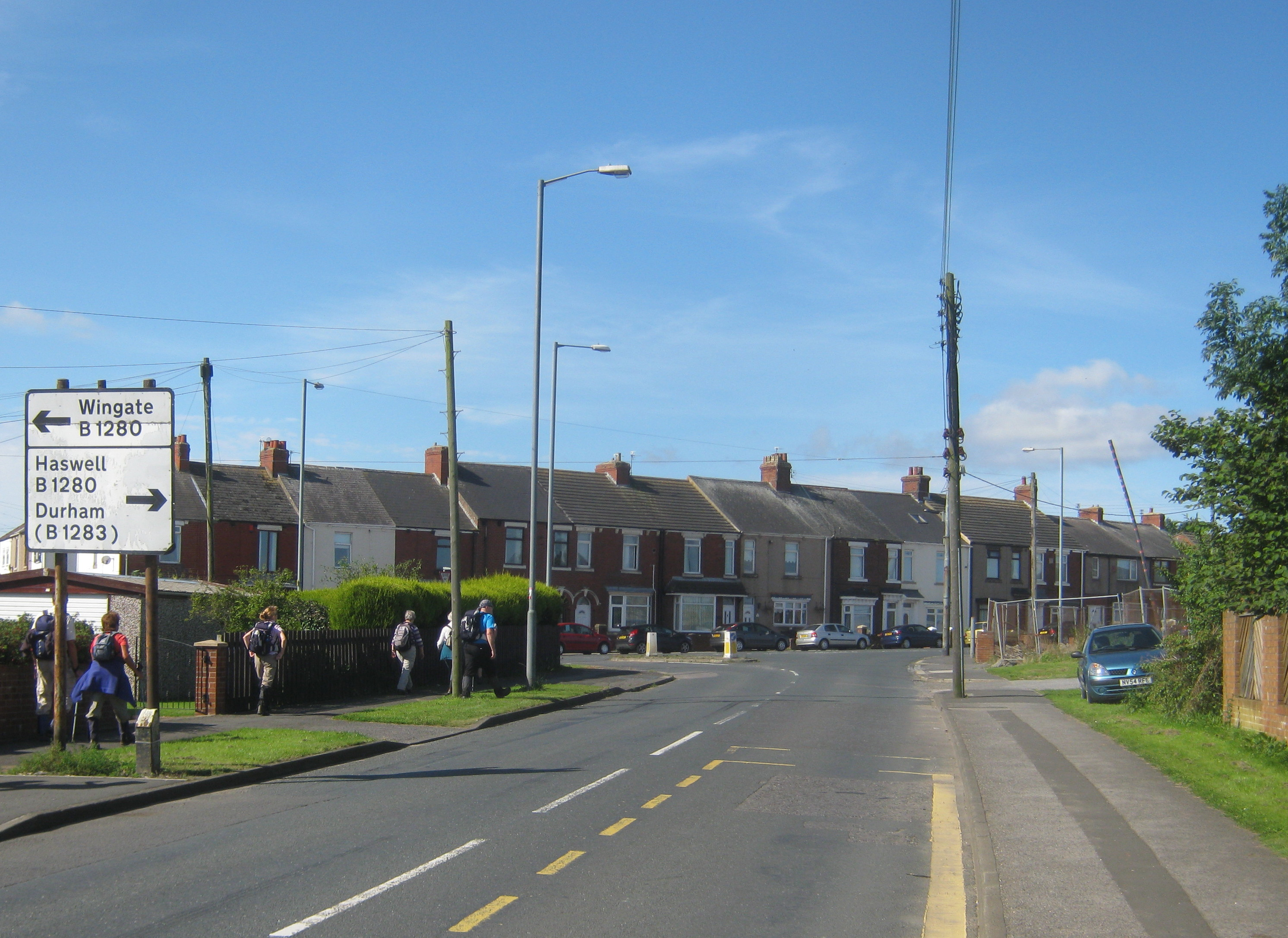
- Station Road meeting Salters Lane

- Location within County Durham
- OS grid reference: NZ386412
- Civil parish: Shotton
- Unitary authority: County Durham
- Ceremonial county: County Durham
- Region: North East
- Country: England
- Sovereign state: United Kingdom
- Post town: DURHAM
- Postcode district: DH6
- Police: Durham
- Fire: County Durham and Darlington
- Ambulance: North East

Fleming Field is a hamlet in the civil parish of Shotton, in County Durham, England. It is situated between Peterlee and Durham, next to Shotton Colliery.
