= Inkerman, County Durham =

Former village in County Durham, England

Coordinates: 54.754°N 1.828°W

Inkerman
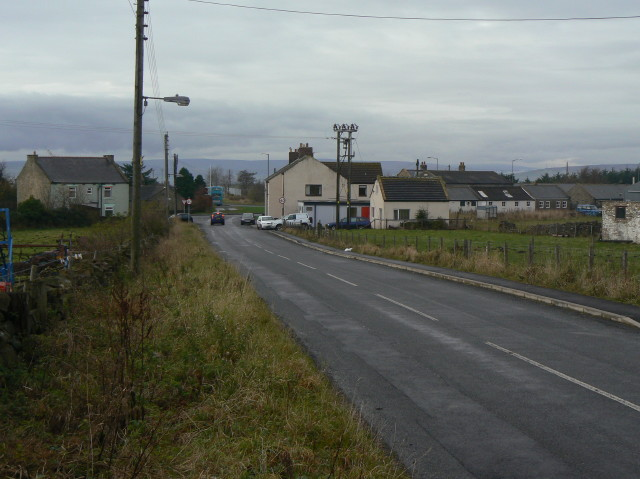
- Inkerman Road

- Location within County Durham
- Unitary authority: County Durham
- Ceremonial county: County Durham
- Region: North East
- Country: England
- Sovereign state: United Kingdom

Inkerman was a village in County Durham, England. Built in 1854–1855 a short distance to the north-west of Tow Law to house ironstone miners, it was named after the victorious Battle of Inkerman of the Crimean War, similarly to Balaclava, another County Durham village. In the 1930s the mines in the area went into liquidation, and the village was demolished in 1938.

Present-day maps retain the name for the handful of houses around the junction of the A68 and Inkerman Road.
