= Oakenshaw, County Durham =

Village in County Durham, England

Coordinates: 54.726°N 1.687°W

Oakenshaw
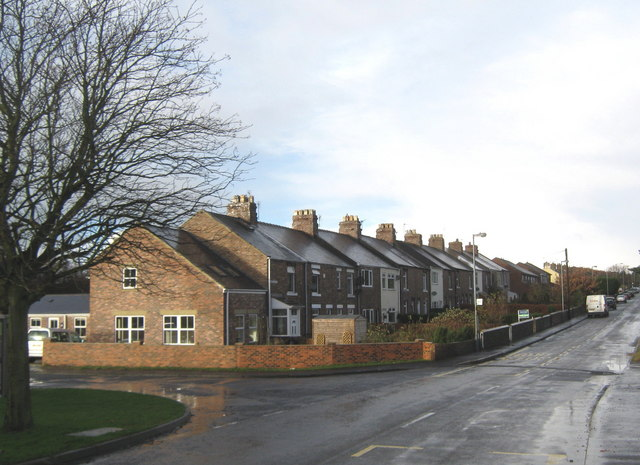
- Institute Street, Oakenshaw photographed in December 2009

- Location within County Durham
- Population: 470 (2001 census)
- Civil parish: Greater Willington
- Unitary authority: County Durham
- Ceremonial county: County Durham
- Region: North East
- Country: England
- Sovereign state: United Kingdom

Oakenshaw is a village in County Durham, in England. It is situated to the north of Willington. In the 2001 census Oakenshaw had a population of 470.

The village was purely a colliery village built for workers at the pit owned by Messrs. Straker & Love. Sinking started in 1855 but definite opening and closing dates are unknown. No disasters of 5 or more people killed were ever recorded but 43 people in total are known to have been killed working at the pit. Once the pit was closed down the village suffered, losing its school and chapels, and several rows of housing were demolished. Housing that was left are now in private ownership and newer housing has been built in the village. The pit was re-opened from 1991 till 1993 but did little to improve the village's economy. Between this point and the millennium the Working Men's Club also closed down, with rumours of a new owner or new housing being built before the building burned down around 2002 due to arson. New housing was built in its place leaving Oakenshaw without a club or pub.

The village is home to a large public open field at one end of the village, it runs parallel to New Row and boasts a small football pitch and playing area. After the closure of the mine a Wildlife Reserve area was set up consisting of woodland and pond areas where the opencast mine used to be situated.
