= Littletown, County Durham =

Coordinates: 54°47.1′N 1°28.2′W

Littletown
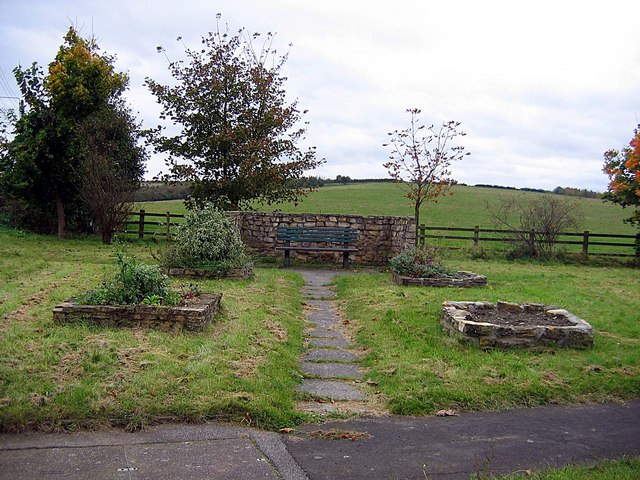
- Community garden at Littletown crossroads

- Location within County Durham
- Civil parish: Pittington
- Unitary authority: County Durham
- Ceremonial county: Durham
- Region: North East
- Country: England
- Sovereign state: United Kingdom
- Police: Durham
- Fire: County Durham and Darlington
- Ambulance: North East

Littletown is a hamlet in the civil parish of Pittington, in County Durham, England. It is situated a few miles to the east of Durham, and was previously the site of the Lambton Colliery.
