= Woodland, County Durham =

Village in County Durham, England

Coordinates: 54.6330°N 1.8891°W

Woodland
- Location within County Durham
- Population: 234 (2011)
- OS grid reference: NZ0726
- Unitary authority: County Durham
- Ceremonial county: County Durham
- Region: North East
- Country: England
- Sovereign state: United Kingdom
- Post town: Bishop Auckland
- Postcode district: DL13
- Police: Durham
- Fire: County Durham and Darlington
- Ambulance: North East
- UK Parliament: Bishop Auckland

Woodland is a rural village in County Durham, England. It is situated 1100 feet above sea level, a few miles to the north of Barnard Castle, and west of Bishop Auckland. Woodland is a typical small rural community with most villagers finding employment in local towns and cities. Agriculture provides a living for a number of villagers, livestock rearing being the most suitable practice for such an upland area. The population of the village was 234 at the 2011 Census. They are served by a primary school, St. Mary's Church, a village hall, a single shop/post office and ‘The Edge’ public house.

Woodland stands 1100 feet above sea level and commands views of the Cumbrian Mountains to the west, the moors of North Yorkshire to the south and, on a clear day, the east coast and North Sea.
