= Mount Pleasant, Spennymoor =

Village in County Durham, England

Coordinates: 54°42′12″N 1°34′52″W

Mount Pleasant is a village in County Durham, England. It is situated immediately to the north-east of Spennymoor, close to Tudhoe.
