= Mordon =

Coordinates: 54°37′58″N 1°29′23″W

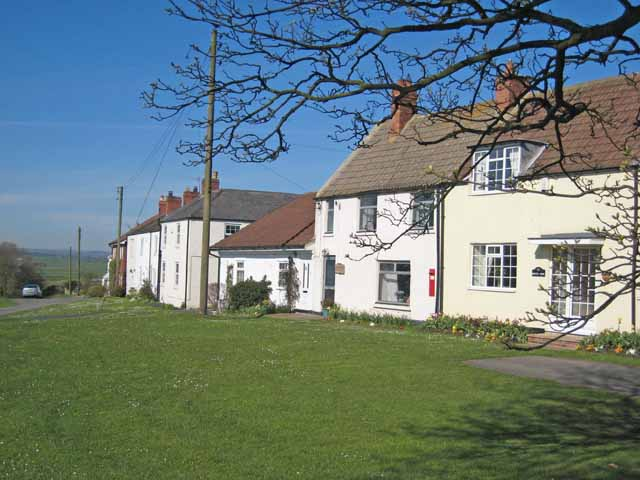
- Mordon in 2007

- Location within County Durham
- Population: 260 (2011 census)
- Civil parish: Mordon
- Unitary authority: County Durham
- Ceremonial county: Durham
- Region: North East
- Country: England
- Sovereign state: United Kingdom

Mordon is a village and civil parish in County Durham, England. It is situated a few miles to the north-east of Newton Aycliffe. The population recorded by the 2011 census for the parish was 260.

In 1872 the population was 179. Mordon was formerly in the parish of Sedgefield, in 1866 Mordon became a civil parish.
