= Staindrop =

Village in County Durham, England

Coordinates: 54.58060°N 1.80167°W

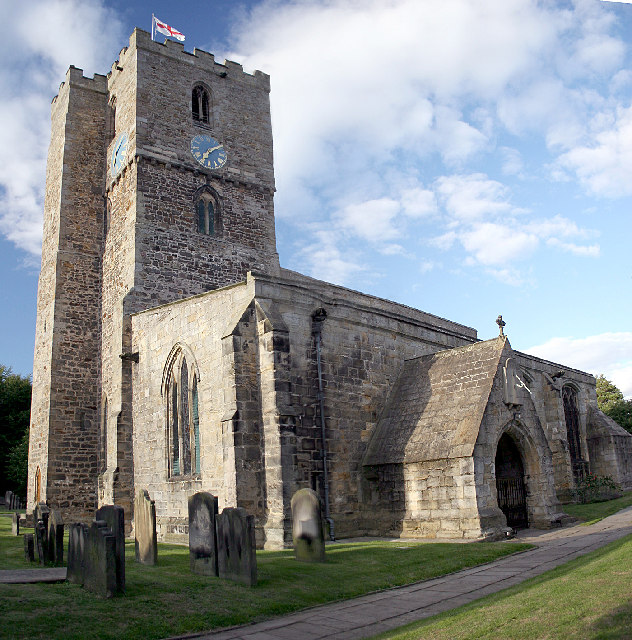
- St Mary's Church, Staindrop

- Location within County Durham
- Population: 1,310
- OS grid reference: NZ128206
- Unitary authority: County Durham
- Ceremonial county: County Durham
- Region: North East
- Country: England
- Sovereign state: United Kingdom
- Post town: DARLINGTON
- Postcode district: DL2
- Police: Durham
- Fire: County Durham and Darlington
- Ambulance: North East
- UK Parliament: Bishop Auckland

Staindrop is a village and civil parish in County Durham, England. It is situated approximately 6 miles (9.7 km) north east of Barnard Castle, on the A688 road. According to the 2011 UK census the population was 1,310, this includes the hamlets of Cleatlam and Killerby.

== Etymology ==
The name Staindrop is Old English in origin and means "stony valley". It is derived from the elements stǣner ("stony ground") + hop ("valley").

== History ==
Around the year 1018, King Canute gave the manors of Raby and Staindrop to Durham Priory. In 1131 Prior Algar granted the manor to an Anglo-Saxon named Dolfin "son of Uhtred", the earliest recorded direct male ancestor of the great Neville family which built as their seat Raby Castle in the north part of the manor. The grant was possibly merely a confirmation of the holding by this family from before the Norman Conquest of 1066. When doing homage to the Prior for his holding he reserved his homage to the kings of England and of Scotland and to the Bishop of Durham and was "no doubt a man of consequence", probably an aristocratic Northumbrian of high birth. In February 1203-4 King John confirmed to the prior and convent all their privileges and vast possessions, including "Staindrop and Staindropshire with the church".

=== Notable buildings ===
Perhaps the most famous building in Staindrop is that of Raby Castle, a medieval castle surrounded by 200 acres of deer park, situated 1.5 miles (2.4 km) north of the village, it was built in the late 14th century by John Neville, 3rd Baron Neville and remains a private home, the seat of the Vane family, the Barons Barnard. Raby Old Lodge dates back to the 14th century, and was once an outpost of Raby Castle, it was extensively altered between 1897 and 1899, it is now used as holiday accommodation.

Other buildings and historic features of note include Scarth Hall, built as the village hall in 1875 and used during the Second World War to provide NAAFI facilities to soldiers stationed in Staindrop, it is now used as a community hub after undergoing refurbishment in 2016. Snotterton Hall was a former fortified manor house dating back to the 15th century, demolished in 1831 and now rebuilt as a farmhouse.

=== Religion ===
The Church of England parish church of St Mary (formerly dedicated to St. Gregory) is Anglo-Saxon. The first church on the site is recorded as having been built in the 8th century (771AD) and the church has been extended and remodelled across the centuries. The church contains monuments including effigies of members of the Neville family, it underwent restoration around 1849. A Congregational chapel also stood from 1868 until the 1970s.

== Governance ==
Staindrop was part of the local government district of Teesdale from 1974 before it was abolished as part of the 2009 structural changes to local government in England. For the purposes of Durham County Council elections, the village is located in the Barnard Castle East ward.

The village lies within the Bishop Auckland parliamentary constituency.

== Community and culture ==
The village has two schools, Staindrop Church of England Primary School with approximately to 170 pupils aged 3–11, and Staindrop Academy, a coeducational secondary school with over 500 pupils aged 11–16, which also houses a community gym, opened in 2020.

The last remaining public house, The Wheatsheaf is a former coaching inn, former pubs include The Black Swan, The Black Lion Inn and The Royal Oak. Other amenities in the village include a SPAR convenience store, a newsagent housing the local post office, tea room, hairdressers and several holiday cottages.

The Staindrop Carnival, an annual parade and fair, celebrated its centenary in 2020. The village football team, Staindrop F.C. play in the Darlington Sunday invitation league, an affiliate of the Durham County Football Association in 2020-2021 they completed a famous double by winning the Alan Rusk trophy as well as the league cup. Raby Castle Cricket Club play in the Darlington & District Cricket League A, having remained unbeaten and winning the league title in the 2019 season.

== Notable people ==
- Burial place of Jeremiah Dixon (1733–1779), who with Charles Mason calculated and laid out the Mason–Dixon line in North America; his unmarked grave is in the Quaker burial ground adjoining the old Friends' Meeting House.
- Birthplace of Charles Bungay Fawcett, on 25 August 1883
- Birthplace of Charles Wilbraham Watson Ford, on 17 July 1896
