= Evenwood =

Village in County Durham, England

Coordinates: 54.620195°N 1.761168°W

- Location within County Durham
- Population: 2,455
- OS grid reference: NZ153112
- Unitary authority: County Durham
- Ceremonial county: County Durham
- Region: North East
- Country: England
- Sovereign state: United Kingdom
- Post town: Bishop Auckland
- Postcode district: DL14
- Police: Durham
- Fire: County Durham and Darlington
- Ambulance: North East

Evenwood is a village in County Durham, in England. It is situated to the south west of Bishop Auckland. It is in the civil parish of Evenwood and Barony, which has a population of 2,534 falling to 2,455 at the 2011 Census.

A former coal mining village, the major pit, Randolph Colliery with its associated coke ovens, was worked between 1893 and 1962, and at its peak in 1914 employed over 1000 men.

== Etymology and name ==
The name Evenwood is of Old English origin. The first element in the name is efen ("even, level") + wudu ("a wood"); equivalent to modern English even + wood and meaning "level woods".

=== As a namesake ===
Evenwood is the namesake of Evenwood in West Virginia - the only settlement so-named in the United States - the parents of that community's founders, lumbermen John and Thomas Raine, having emigrated to the US from the County Durham village in 1849.

== Governance ==
An electoral ward in the name of Evenwood exists. This ward stretches west to Woodland with a total population of 8,114.
