= Greencroft =

Village in County Durham, England

Coordinates: 54.85°N 1.75°W

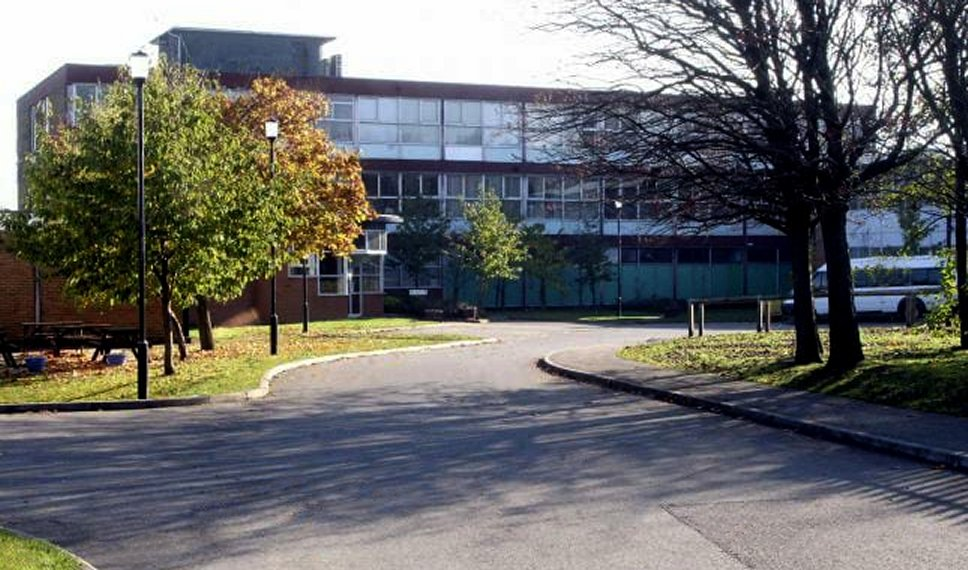
The former Greencroft Comprehensive School, Greencroft, County Durham.

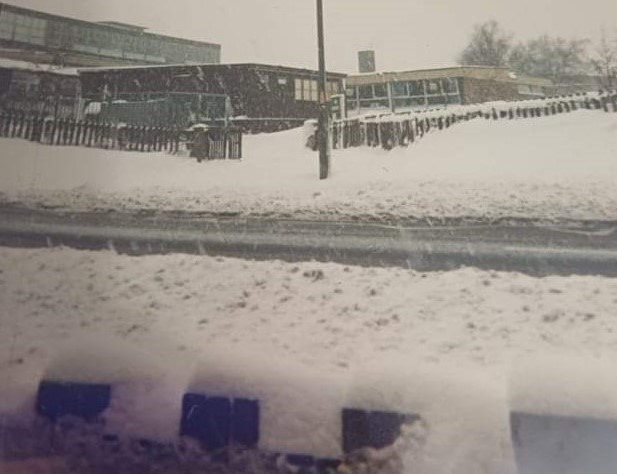
Greencroft Comprehensive in the snow.

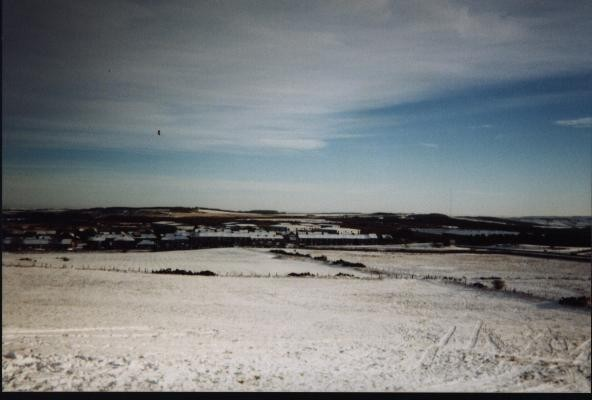
Greencroft from near top of nearby Loud Bank.

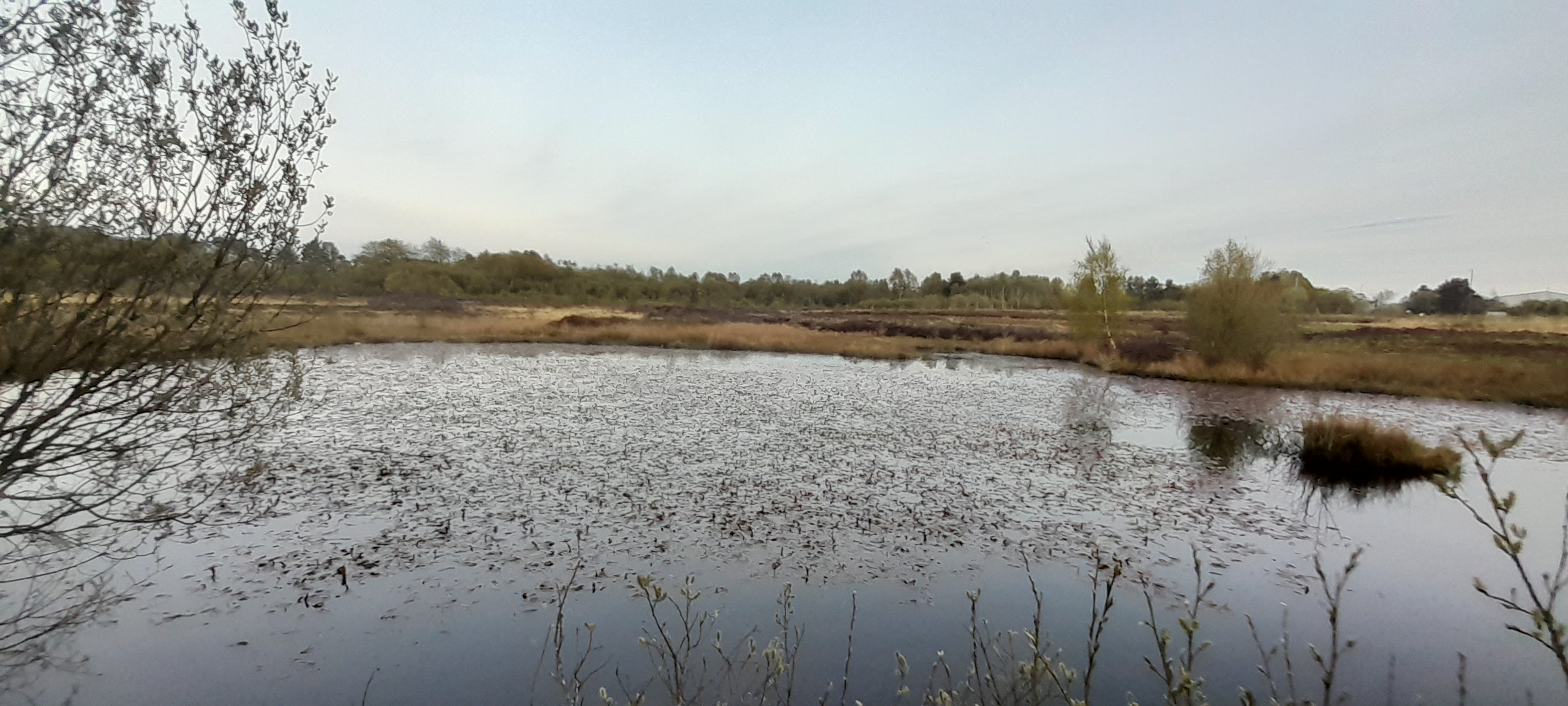
Alexander Pond, Greencroft Nature Reserve

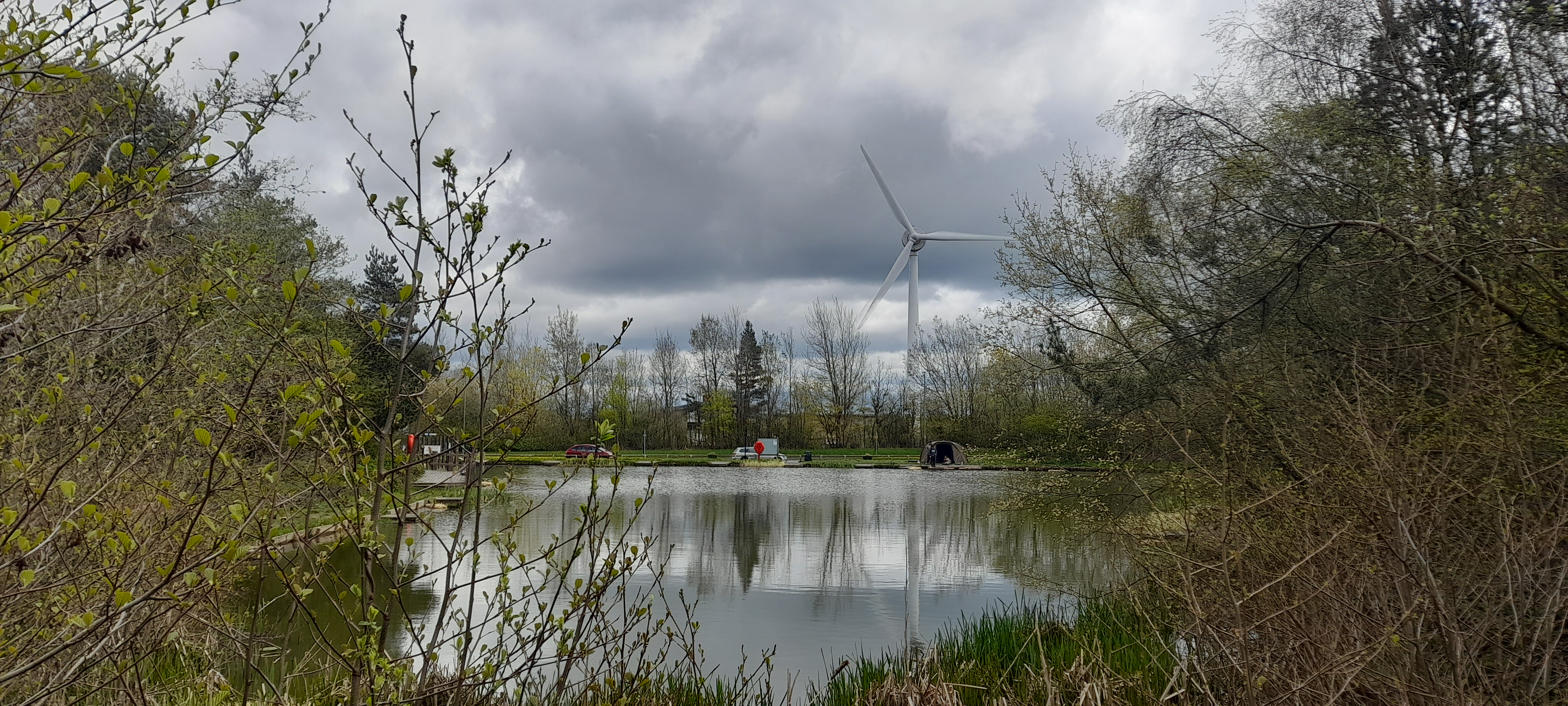
Greencroft Fishing Pond or Greencroft Tarn, located in Greencroft Industrial Park, County Durham.

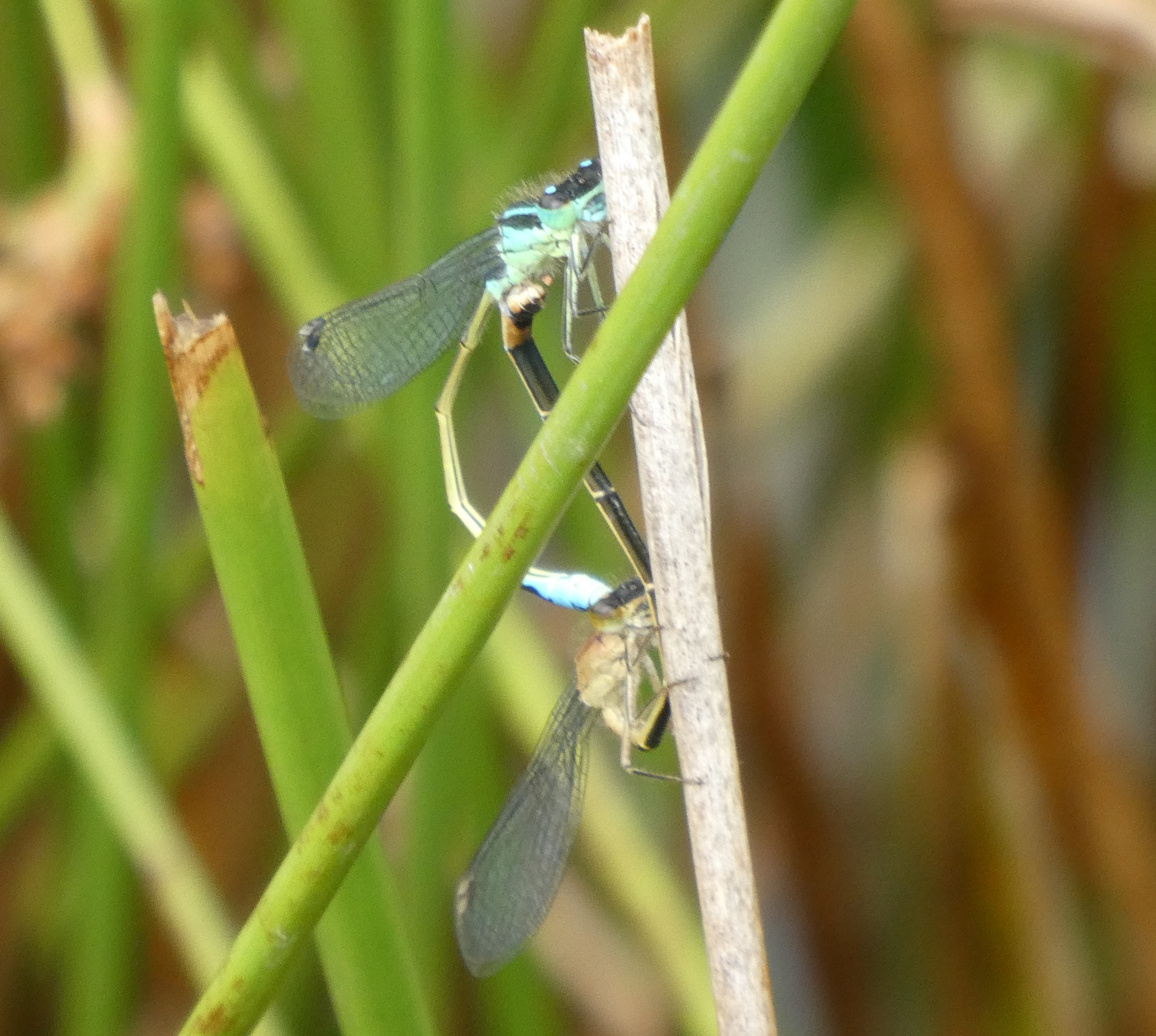
Damselflies mating at Greencroft Fishing Pond (Greencroft Tarn)

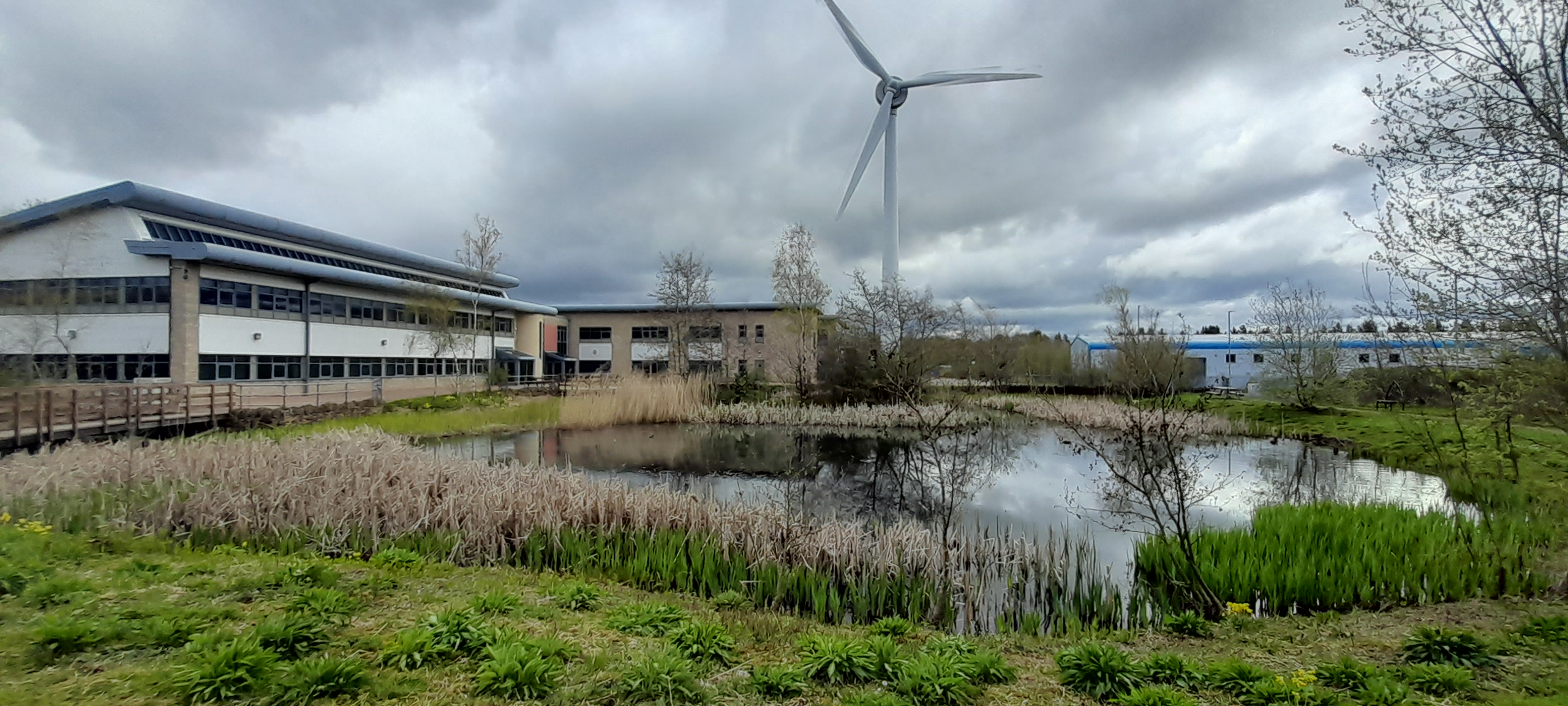
Quarzi Pond or Quarzi Tarn, located next to an eco-office building called the Greenhouse, in Greencroft Industrial Park, County Durham. The small Duck Island in the middle has a very small population of breeding mallard ducks.

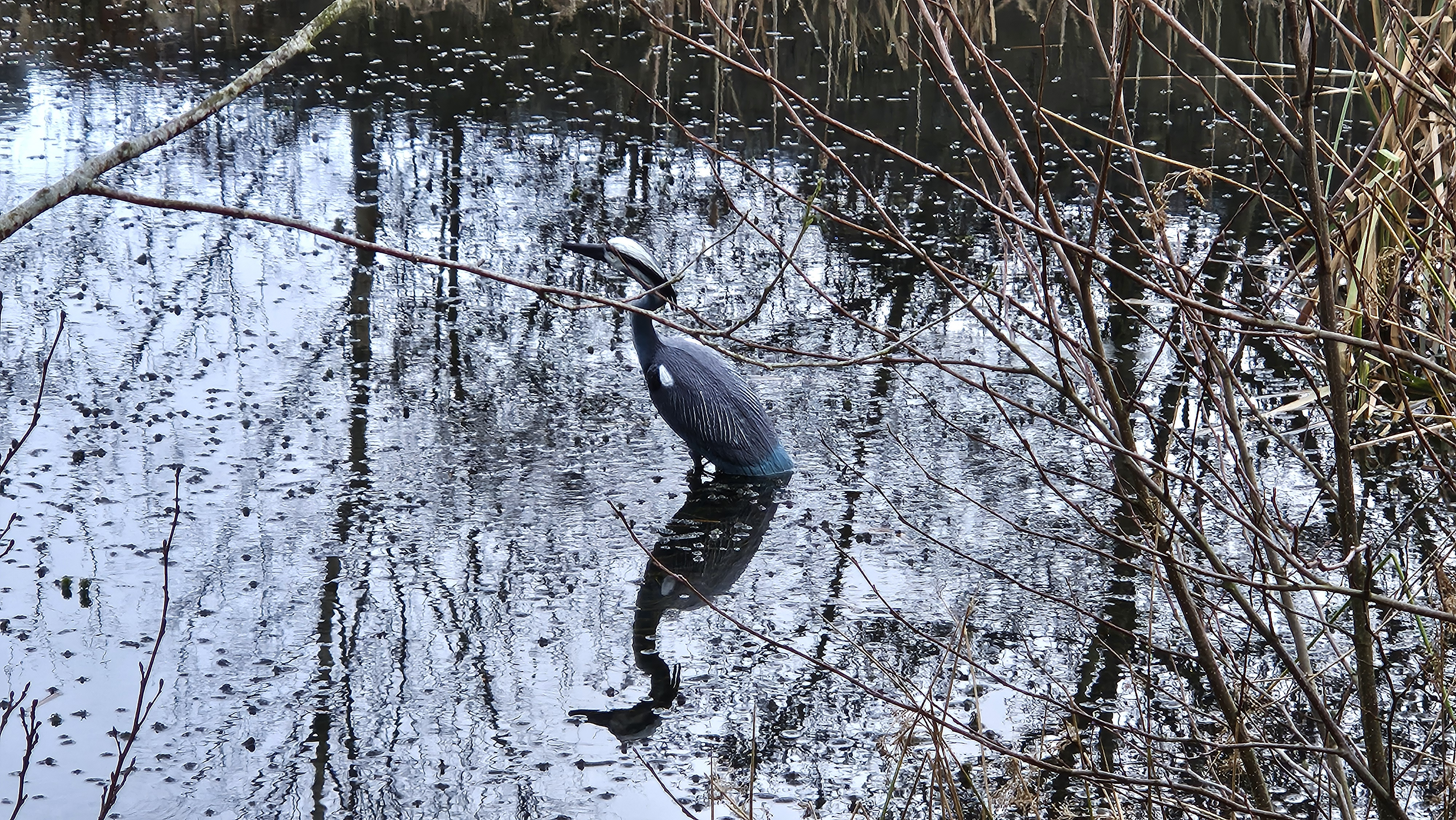
The Heron, a sculpture within the water on the south side of Quarzi Tarn, Greencroft.

Greencroft is a village and separately a parish in County Durham, England. Together, they are situated between Lanchester and Annfield Plain.

Greencroft consists of two entities:

- The Village of Greencroft is a suburb of Annfield Plain and not part of the parish of Greencroft. This article concerns mainly the village.
- The Parish of Greencroft is separate and lies to the south, between Greencroft village and Annfield Plain in the north and Lanchester to the south. The parish includes the village of Maiden Law directly between Annfield Plain and Lanchester. The population of the civil parish (which doesn't include the village) taken at the 2011 census was 171.

Greencroft village is mainly centred around a crossroads through which the A693 formerly passed (Annfield Plain to the south, Catchgate to the east, Loud Bank to the north beyond which the old A693 road joins the current A693 near East Castle). On this crossroads is situated Croft Community School, a school for special needs pupils. This transferred from Harelaw to occupy the former site of Greencroft Comprehensive School.

Greencroft Nature Reserve to the south and east of Greencroft towards the current A693, with the eastern boundary defined by Annfield Plain and home of Annfield Plain Football Club, Derwent Park Stadium. The nature reserve consists almost entirely of heath land, with Alexander Pond directly to the south of the stadium.

Annfield Plain Cricket Club is situated on the northern edge of the nature reserve, backing onto Greencroft village itself.

The C2C cycle route passes through Greencroft Village, Greencroft Nature Reserve and Greencroft Industrial Park on its Consett to Sunderland branch (NCN7).

== Greencroft Comprehensive and Croft Community Schools ==
The former Greencroft Comprehensive School or Greencroft Business and Enterprise Community School was split into two sites after its formation in 1965.

- The lower school (first and second years) was situated at New Kyo on the site of the former Annfield Plain Intermediate School;
- The upper school (third, fourth and fifth years) was located at Greencroft on the site of a former post-war grammar school;
- A sixth form existed until 1985 at the upper school, the last year of intake before sixth formers were transferred to Derwentside College.

The lower and upper schools were merged in the late 1990s, with all pupils from that point on taught at the upper school site in Greencroft. After this reorganisation the school name was changed to Greencroft Business and Enterprise Community School, but was also known by the truncated name "Greencroft School".

In July 2010 the school was merged with Stanley School of Technology to be replaced by North Durham Academy in September 2011. The building itself was vacated in September 2013 when the new North Durham Academy campus opened in Stanley.

The aforementioned Croft Community School then took over the site, with redevelopment work including demolition of the main three-storey block. Croft Community School teaches pupils with moderate learning difficulties and autism. It transferred from its original, smaller site in Harelaw in 2025, changing its name at the same time from Harelaw Community School.

== Greencroft Industrial Park ==
To the west, the current A693 splits Greencroft from Greencroft Industrial Park, created and built during the 1990s on land belonging to the former Greencroft Hall Estate. The industrial park is considered part of the village of Greencroft (and thus also Annfield Plain), with the separate parish of Greencroft starting along the unclassified Greencroft to Maiden Law road along its southern boundary.

The industrial park was possibly officially opened in 1993 by former Newcastle United goalkeeper John Burridge during the second of his three periods with the club, though this cannot be confirmed.

The C2C coast-to-coast cycle path, after leaving Consett and Leadgate to the north west, passes through this industrial park and past two further ponds, both of which are local fishing ponds:

- Greencroft Fishing Pond or Greencroft Tarn, hosting fish, amphibians and a population of breeding damselflies; and
- Quarzi Pond or Quarzi Tarn hosting a small breeding population of mallard that nest on the small Duck Island in the middle of the pond, situated next to an eco-office building called the Greenhouse

...before crossing over a foot and cycle bridge into Annfield Plain past Annfield Plain Park. The latter pond at least, Quarzi Tarn, may pre-date the industrial park as water may have pooled in a depression at the pond's location in the pre-existing fields.

The use of the Old Norse word tarn (tjörn) to describe a pond is unusual in County Durham, this entymology being more common in Cumbria, Lancashire and North Yorkshire. The only other known tarn in the Durham area is the artificially created Kyo Tarn near Oxhill. One possibility is the use of tarn might have been carried over from Cumbria by long distance cyclists using the C2C.

A sculpture called The Heron is situated within Quarzi Tarn on its south side, with urban legend linking it with Angel of the North creator, Anthony Gormley.

The Ransome & Marles ball bearing factory (later Ransome, Hoffman and Pollard) was sited to the north of the Greencroft Industrial Park site between 1954 and 1992. The factory building now forms part of the industrial park.

== East Castle ==
East Castle is a small group of houses lying on the A693 to the north west of Greencroft proper, on the way to Leadgate and Consett. It is situated on a crossroads, with Dipton and Pontop Pike Television Transmitter (which towers over East Castle) to the north east and Stony Heap to the south west.

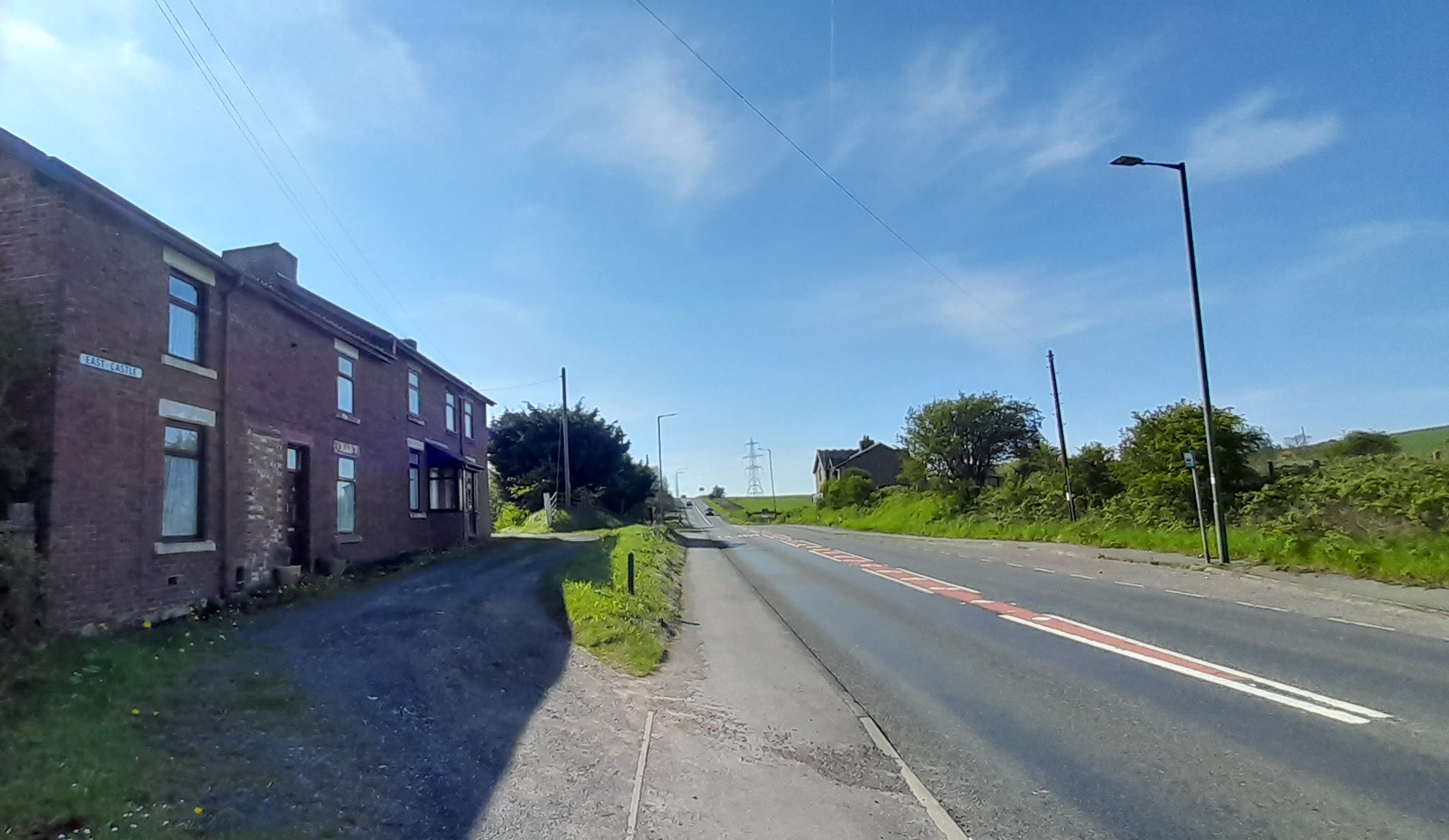
East Castle, to the north west of Greencroft. The farmouse on the right used to be the East Castle Inn.

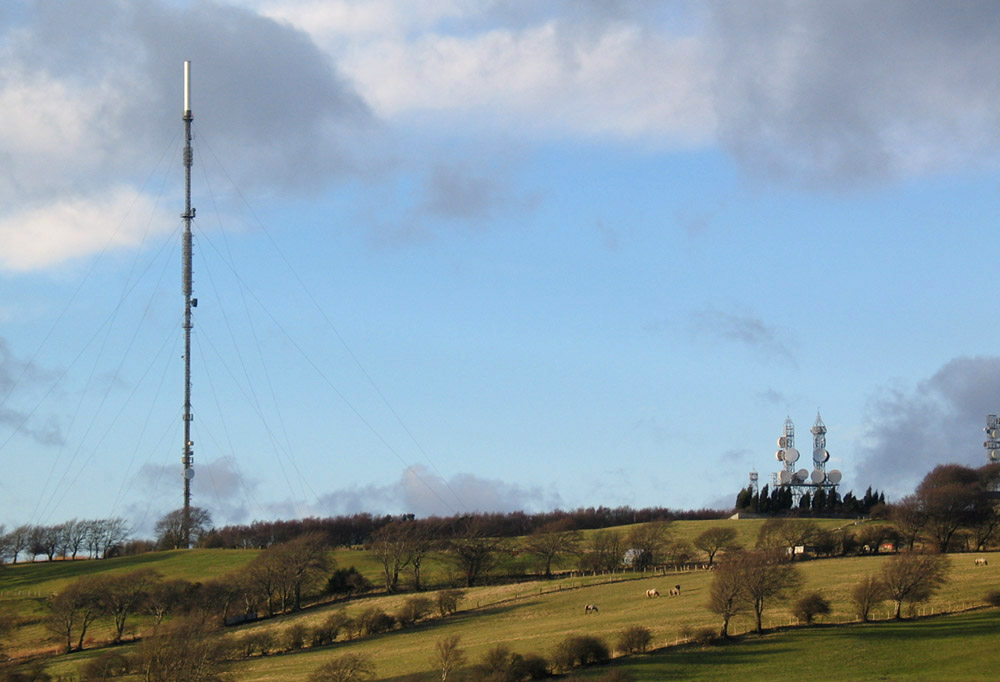
Pontop Pike transmission mast, overlooking Annfield Plain to the north west.

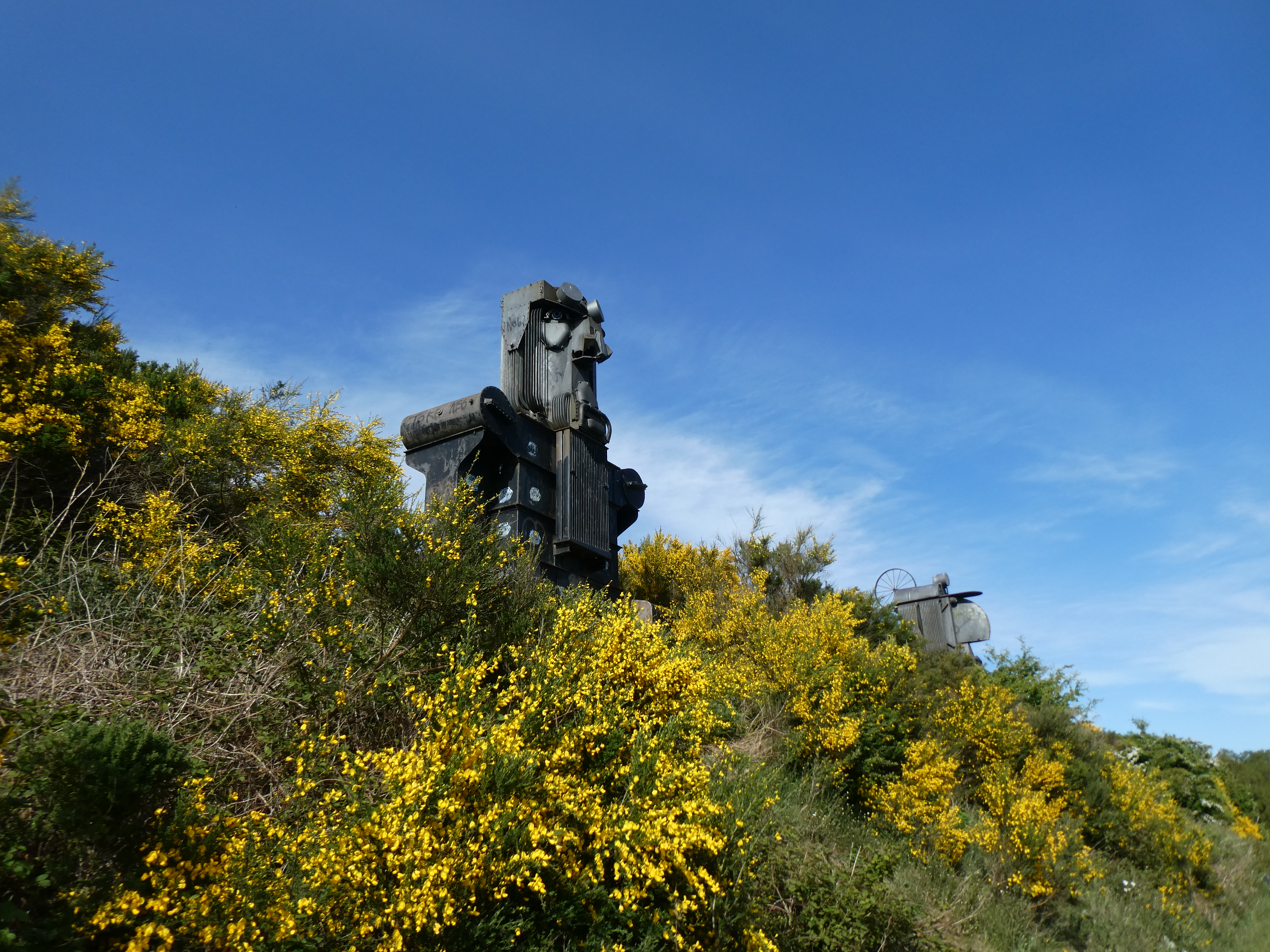
The Old Transformers on the C2C cycle route just to the north west of East Castle. Facing south east, they are a creation of David Kemp.

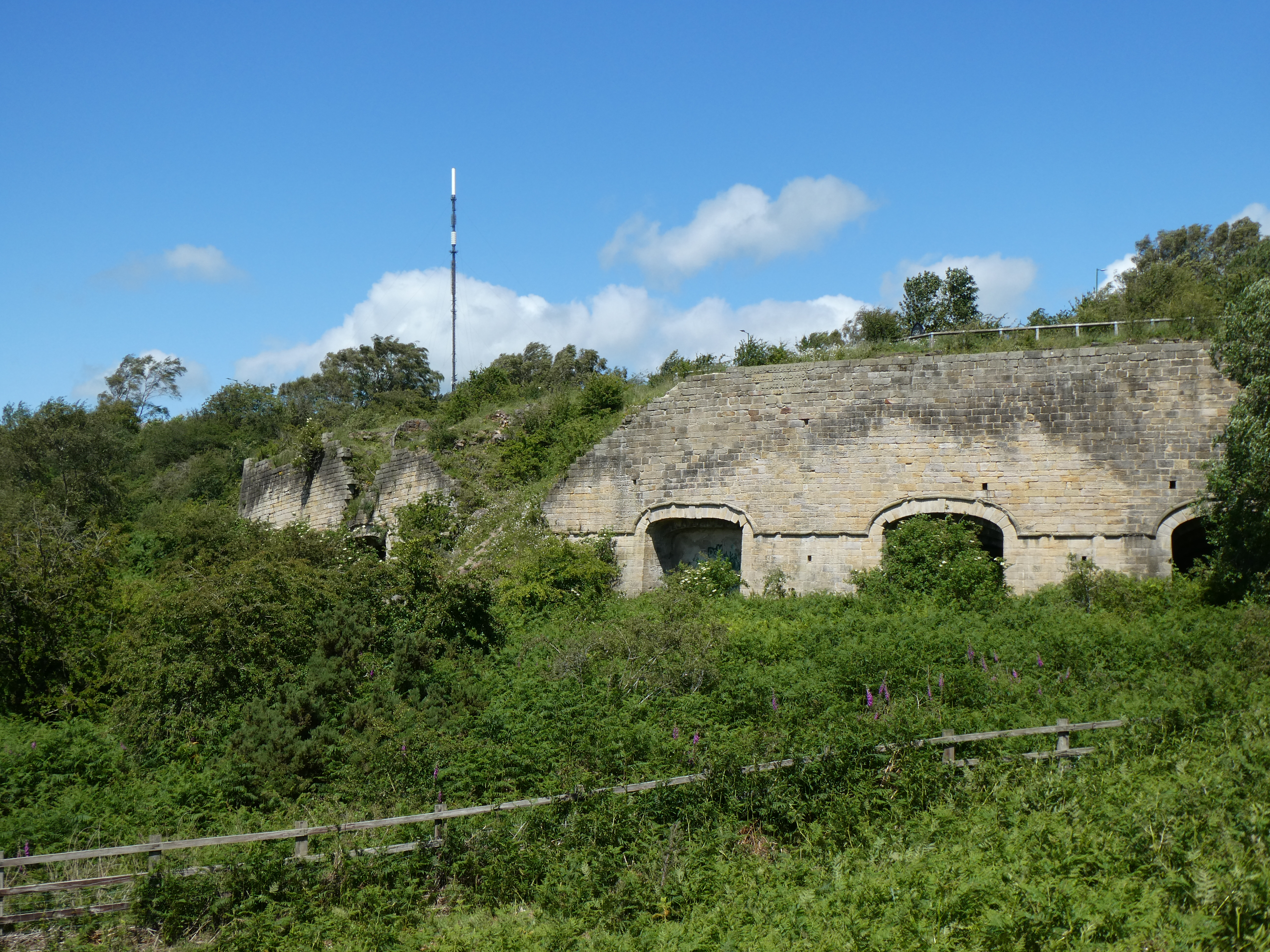
Bantling Lime Kilns at East Castle, Annfield Plain, with Pontop Pike television transmission mast in the background.

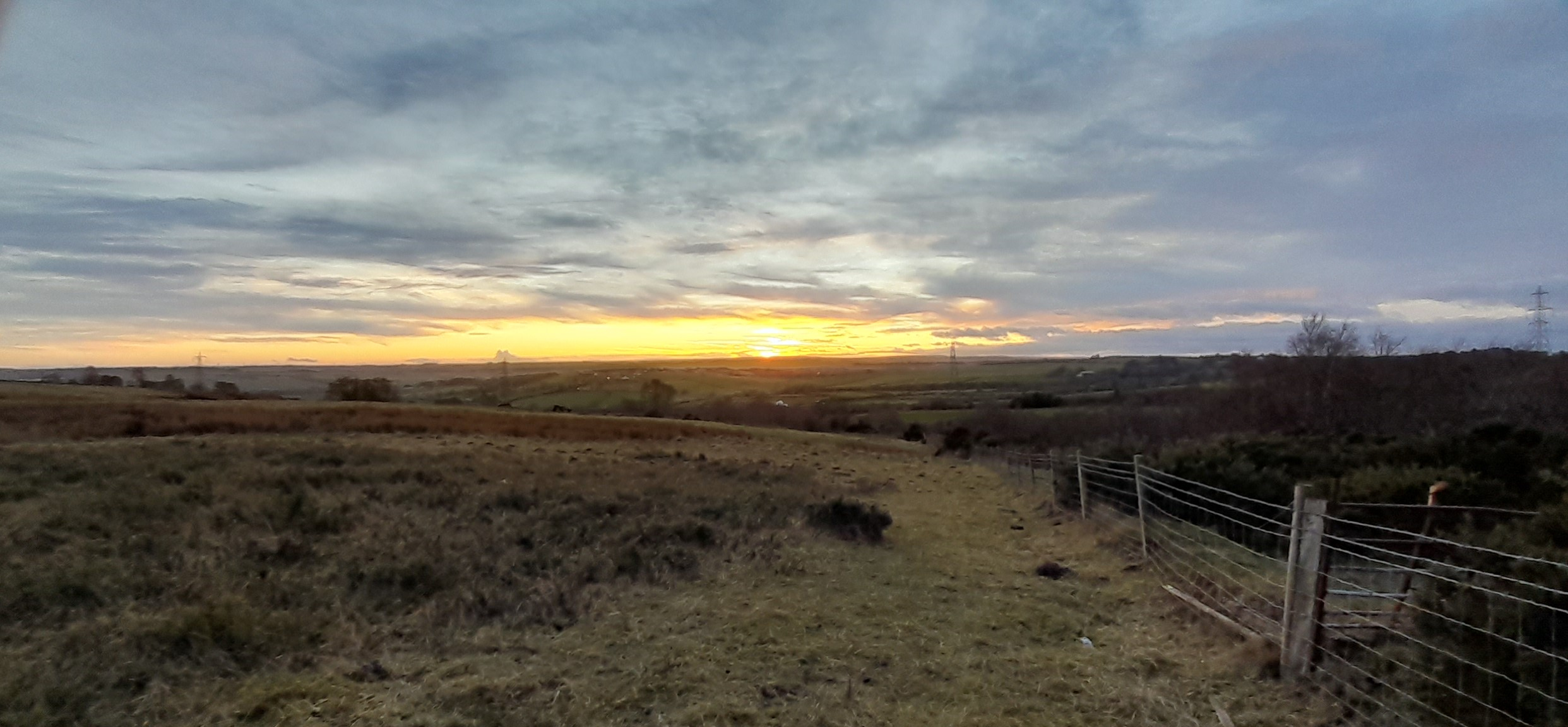
Sunset at East Castle, looking south west towards Iveston.

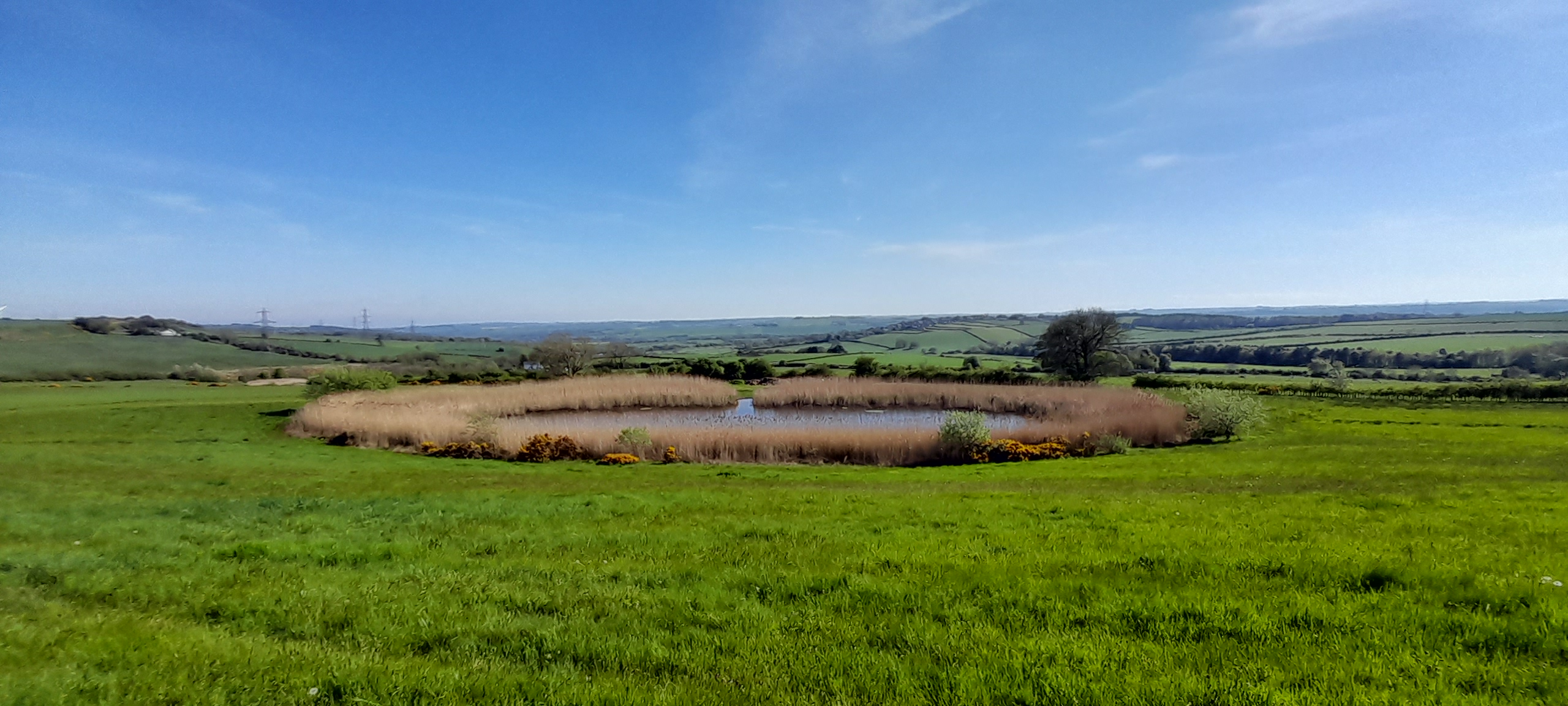
Pontop Water, to the north west of East Castle and Greencroft.

East Castle consists of a terrace of four houses of the same name and a farm (the farmhouse used to be "East Castle Inn"), all to the south east of the crossroads. A much larger settlement used to exist at this location, with a now demolished street on the north east of the A693. A village shop also used to exist here.

The C2C cross-country cycle route passes through East Castle to the south west of the four terrace houses, the route passing virtually parallel to the A693 and coming from Greencroft to the south east toward Leadgate to the north west. The route of the cycle path follows the line of the old Stanhope and Tyne Railway. The Old Transformers is a dual sculpture sitting on the C2C and created by David Kemp, face south east towards Iveston, just to the north west of East Castle.

Bantling Lime Kilns are also adjacent to the C2C, just to the east of East Castle and heading towards Greencroft. The C2C was diverted off the top of the Bantling Lime Kilns some years ago due to safety concerns. A stream, Newhouse Burn, flows south west away from the lime kilns before eventually joining the River Browney nearer Lanchester.

To the north west of East Castle towards Leadgate and Brooms, with access off the C2C 200 m and 400 m north west of the Old Transformers, is an open park area (access both off south west side). There are three ponds on this reclaimed site, with the largest of these being Pontop Water towards the west. The two smaller, unnamed ponds are to the extreme south west of the site towards Stoney Heap.
