= Harelaw =

Village in County Durham, England

Coordinates: 54.870°N 1.749°W

- Location within County Durham
- OS grid reference: NZ161528
- Unitary authority: County Durham
- Ceremonial county: County Durham
- Region: North East
- Country: England
- Sovereign state: United Kingdom
- Post town: DURHAM
- Postcode district: DH9
- Police: Durham
- Fire: County Durham and Darlington
- Ambulance: North East

Harelaw is a village in County Durham, in England. It is situated on the B6168 road to the north of Annfield Plain and Catchgate, south of Flint Hill and east of Dipton.

Carrmyers Pond and Carrmyers Burn form the boundary between Catchgate and Harelaw. St. Thomas's Church sits next to Carrmyers Burn on the B6168 road passing through Harelaw towards Catchgate.

Harelaw Special School was situated on the opposite side of the B6168 to St. Thomas's Church until 2013. This relocated to nearby Greencroft to become Croft Community School when Greencroft Business and Enterprise Community School merged with Stanley School of Technology and moved to Stanley to become North Durham Academy. Croft Community School took over the vacated site.

A small village shop existed in the centre of Harelaw until the late 1980s, before being converted into a house. A small industrial estate is situated on Harelaw's northern edge on the road to Flint Hill.

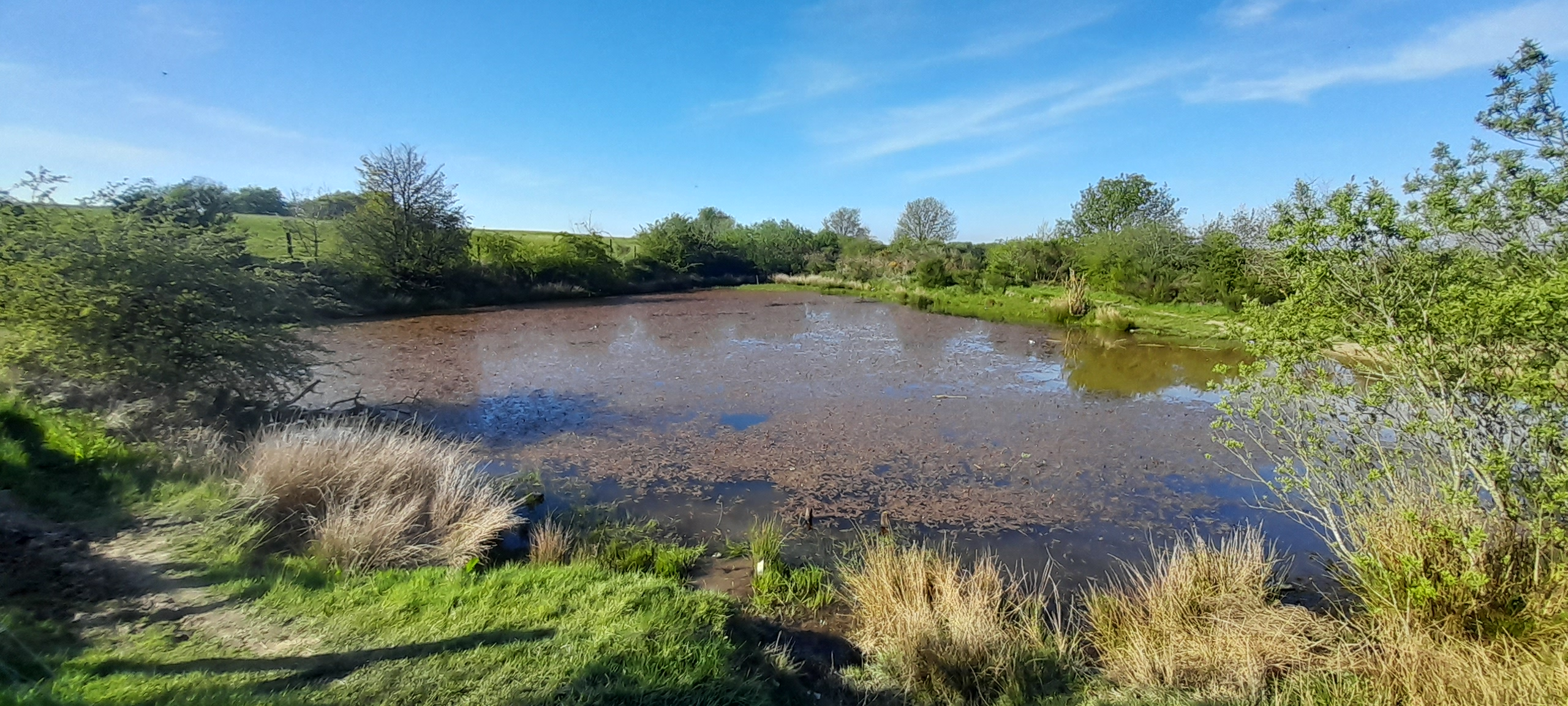
Carrmyers Pond, on boundary of Catchgate and Harelaw

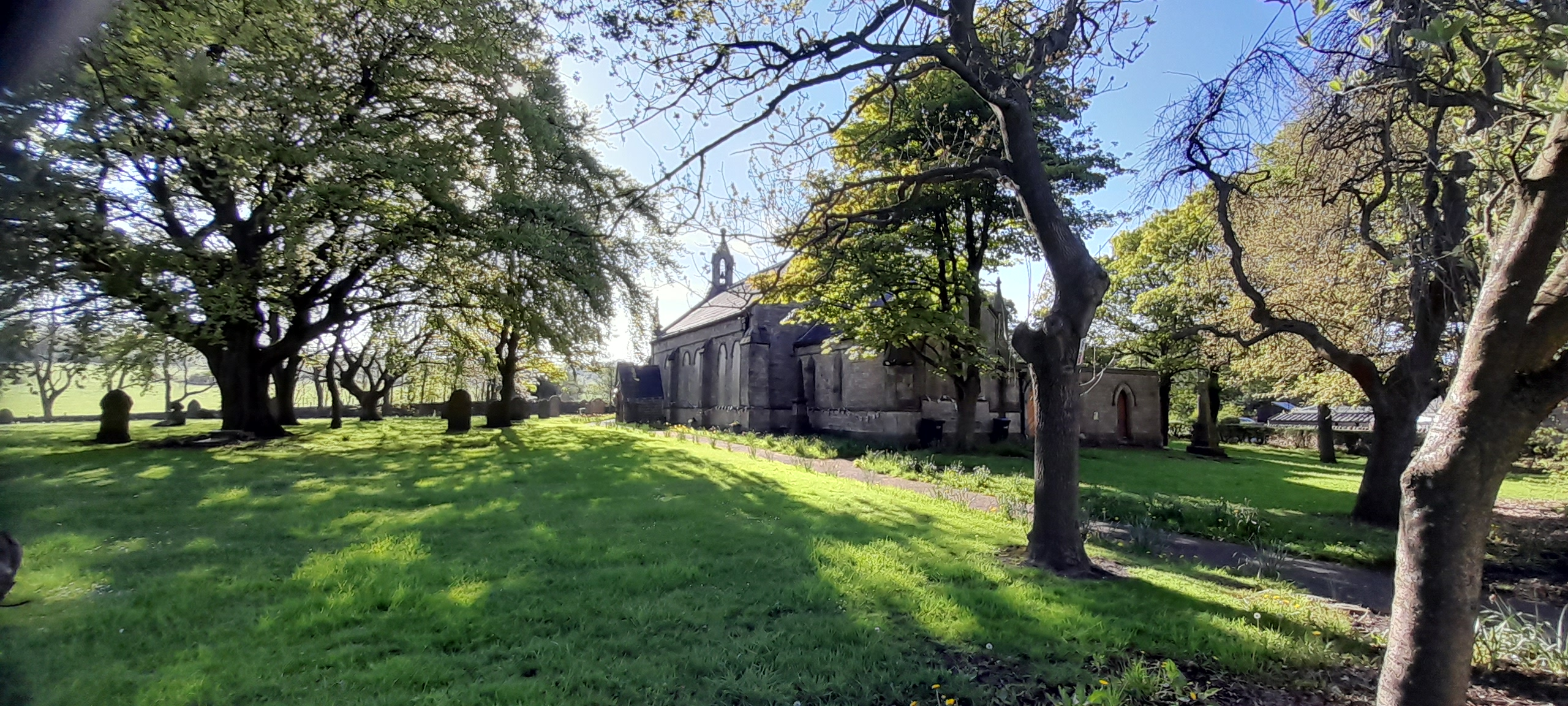
St. Thomas's Church, Harelaw, on the B6168 road to Catchgate.
