= Delves Lane =

Village in County Durham, England

Coordinates: 54.841°N 1.811°W

- Location within County Durham
- OS grid reference: NZ122495
- Unitary authority: County Durham
- Ceremonial county: County Durham
- Region: North East
- Country: England
- Sovereign state: United Kingdom
- Post town: DURHAM
- Postcode district: DH8
- Dialling code: 01207
- Police: Durham
- Fire: County Durham and Darlington
- Ambulance: North East
- UK Parliament: Blaydon and Consett

Delves Lane is a small village to the south of Consett, County Durham, England. The housing in the area was built as a suburb of Consett, historically providing housing for people working in the former mining and steel industries. The village has one pub: 'The Traveller's Rest'.

An unclassified road passes through the village from the A692 bypassing Consett, linking up with the A691 road between Leadgate and the nearby village of Lanchester. There is a crossroads at the south end of the village, with roads heading north-east to Iveston and south-west to Knitsley.

Delves Lane and Delves House perhaps derive their name from the delf holes (pits, quarries) created by the 17th and 18th-century quarrying, attributed to the swordmakers of Shotley Bridge. It was reported that in 1837 the only habitations in the immediate neighbourhood of Consett were Delves House, Carr House, and Barr House. Noted on the Ordnance Survey Durham Sheet XI (1862) as Delfts with the road listed as Delfts Lane, later editions refer to "Delves".

Delves colliery was first worked in 1847 as the Latter Day Saints pit named because it was first worked by Mormons. The name changed to the Saints pit and it closed in 1913. The Victory pit was opened in 1921 and closed in 1963. The pits provided coal for the Consett Iron Company as well as clay for the Delves brick works.

There is a village hall, which was constructed in 1925.

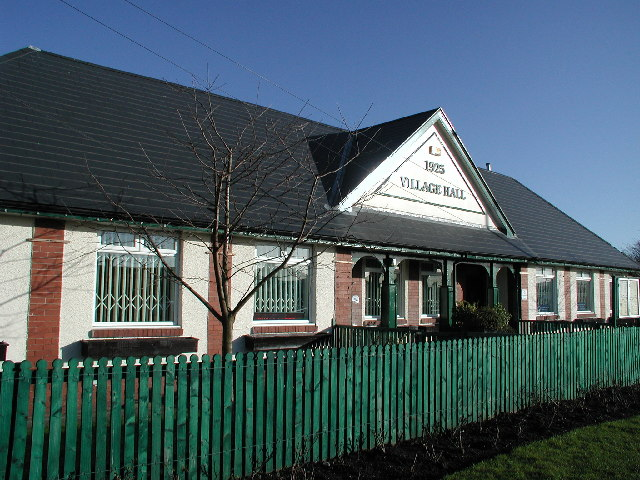
Delves Lane's village hall

== Education ==
Local schools include Delves Lane Infant School, and Delves Lane Junior School. The two schools have recently joined together and are now Delves Lane Community School.
