= Stony Heap =

Coordinates: 54.857°N 1.774°W

- Location within County Durham
- OS grid reference: NZ146513
- Unitary authority: County Durham
- Ceremonial county: County Durham
- Region: North East
- Country: England
- Sovereign state: United Kingdom
- Post town: DURHAM
- Postcode district: DH8
- Police: Durham
- Fire: County Durham and Darlington
- Ambulance: North East

Stony Heap is a hamlet in County Durham, in England. It is situated between Leadgate and Annfield Plain. There used to be 6 houses and 2 farms plus the pit, now there is 1 house and 1 farm.
