= Walter Ellison (footballer) =

English footballer

Personal information
- Full name: Samuel Walter Ellison
- Date of birth: 27 August 1923
- Place of birth: Leadgate, County Durham, England
- Date of death: December 1994 (age 71)
- Place of death: Isle of Wight
- Height: 5 ft 9 in (1.75 m)
- Position: Winger

Youth career
- Middlesbrough Crusaders

Senior career*
Years	Team	Apps	(Gls)
1945–1948	Sunderland	3	(0)
1948–1949	Consett		
1949–1950	Reading	4	(0)
1950–1951	Brighton & Hove Albion	0	(0)
- * Club domestic league appearances and goals

Samuel Walter Ellison (27 August 1923 – December 1994) was an English professional footballer who played as a winger for Sunderland.
