= Catchgate =

Hamlet in County Durham, England

Coordinates: 54.865°N 1.749°W

- Hamlet
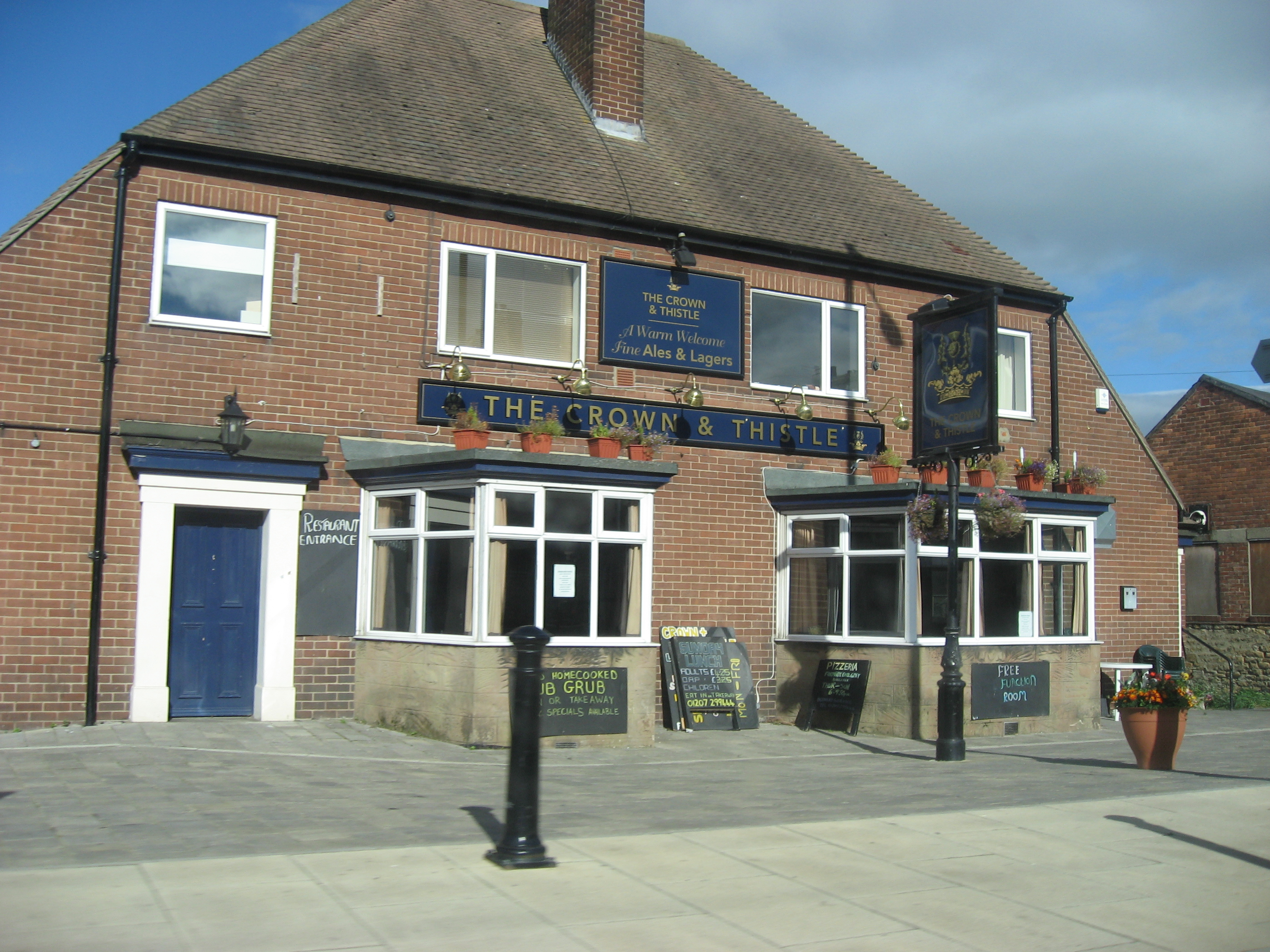
- Crown and Thistle pub, aka Bob Bells

- Location within County Durham
- Population: 3,000 (approx)
- OS grid reference: NZ162523
- Unitary authority: County Durham
- Ceremonial county: County Durham
- Region: North East
- Country: England
- Sovereign state: United Kingdom
- Post town: STANLEY
- Postcode district: DH9
- Police: Durham
- Fire: County Durham and Darlington
- Ambulance: North East

Catchgate is a former mining village in County Durham, England. It has a population of approximately 3,000 people. The nearest town is Stanley, also a former coal mining community. The town of Consett, once famous for its steel works, is 5 miles (8.0 km) away.

== Geography ==
Catchgate is bordered by the villages of Greencroft to the west, Annfield Plain to the south, Harelaw to the north (the B6168 runs through it from Annfield Plain to Harelaw), and West Kyo (also known as Old Kyo) to the east. To the west of Catchgate was Pontop village, now no more than a few bungalows, dominated by the enormous Pontop Pike television and radio transmitter. Carrmyers Pond and Carrmyers Burn form the northern boundary of Catchgate, beyond which is Harelaw.

== Facilities ==
Catchgate is home to the Annfield Plain library, on the boundary with Annfield Plain, and also the Crown and Thistle pub, known locally as Bob Bell's after a former owner who is rumoured to haunt the pub. A small police station is situated at the north end of the village, though it is only partially staffed. Another pub, the Smiths Arms, now derelict, is situated on Catchgate crossroads. A number of working men's clubs used to exist, notably the Excelsior, the RAOB and the Buffs. The last of these has now been converted and split into three premises, a retail shop, a boxing club and a currently vacant premises.

A fish shop is located just to the east of Catchgate crossroads. Opposite this is the former Bethany Chapel, which was temporarily home to an employment agency after closure. A second retail shop and two hair dressers complete the more permanent businesses in Catchgate.

== Education ==
Catchgate Primary School is situated 200 m (660 ft) west of Catchgate Crossroads on the road to Greencroft. The school was moved (100 m (330 ft) to the west in the 2000s when the old infant and junior school were demolished and replaced by a housing estate.

== Gallery ==
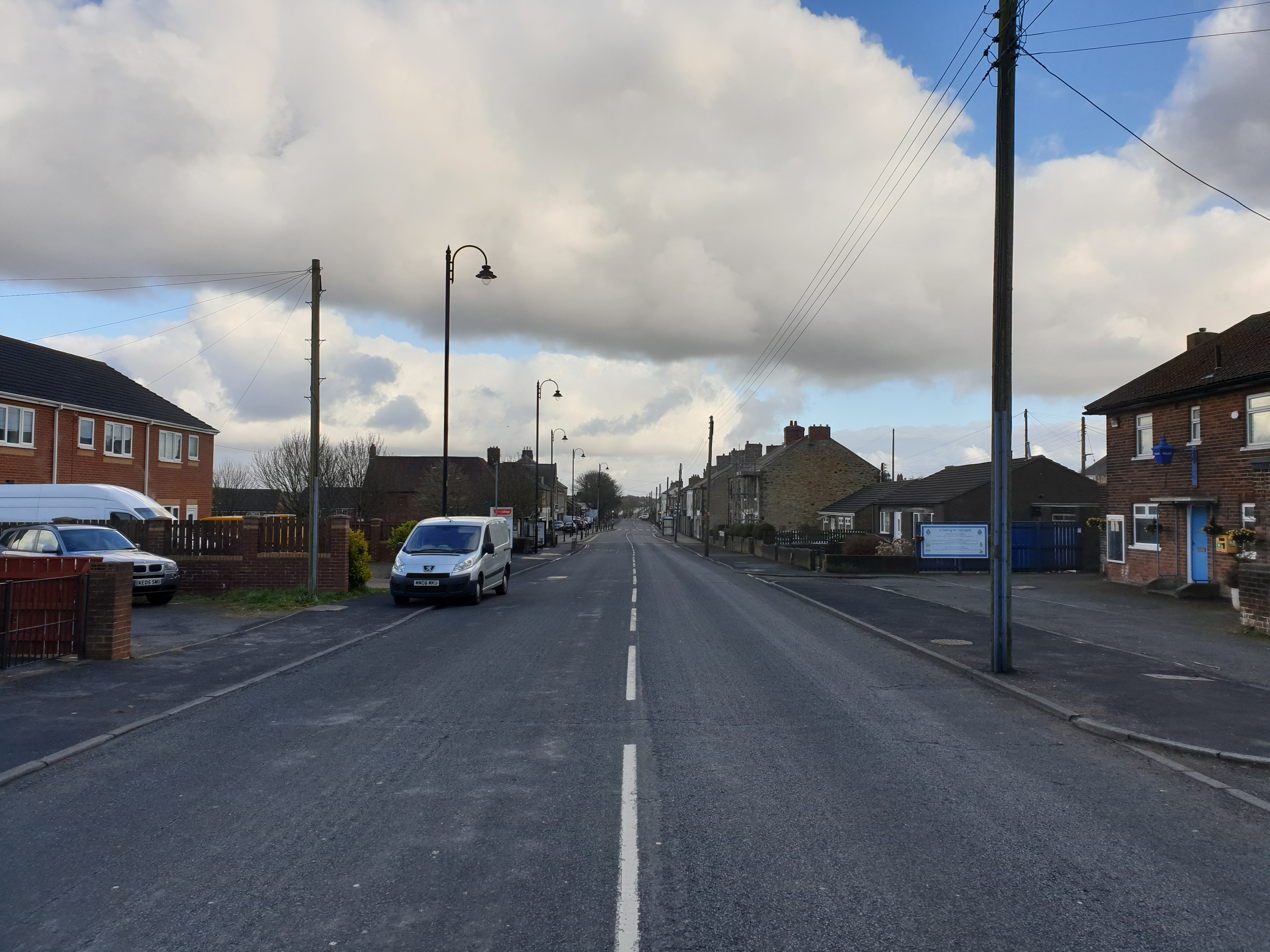
Catchgate, looking south along the front street

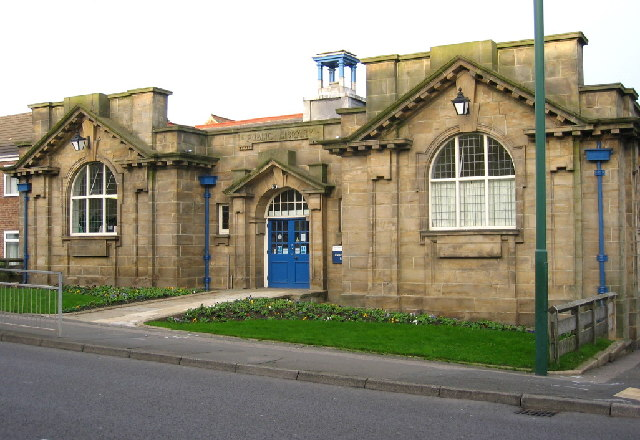
Annfield Plain Public Library, actually located in Catchgate

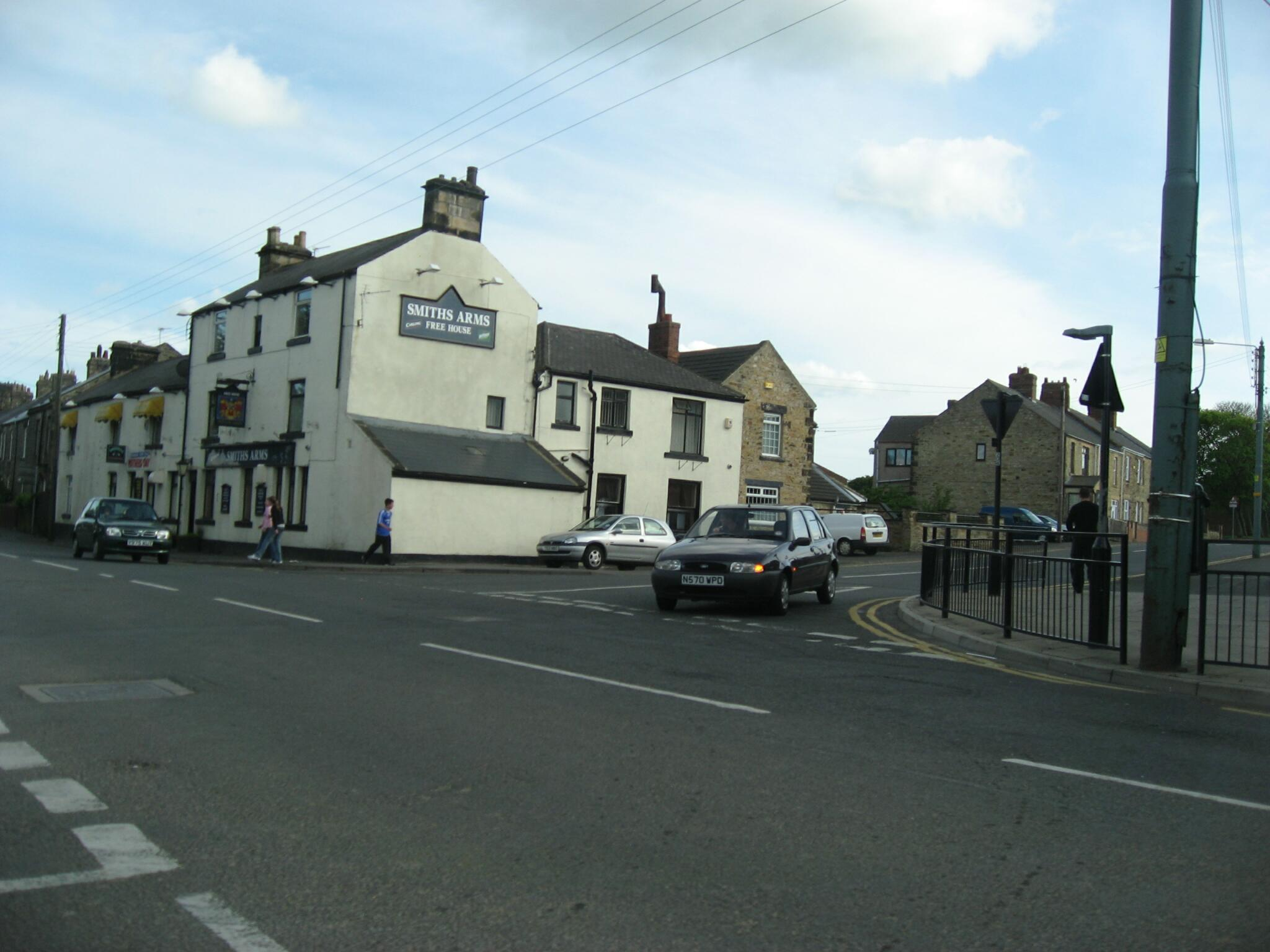
Smiths Arms, a former pub on Catchgate crossroads. The building is now derelict.

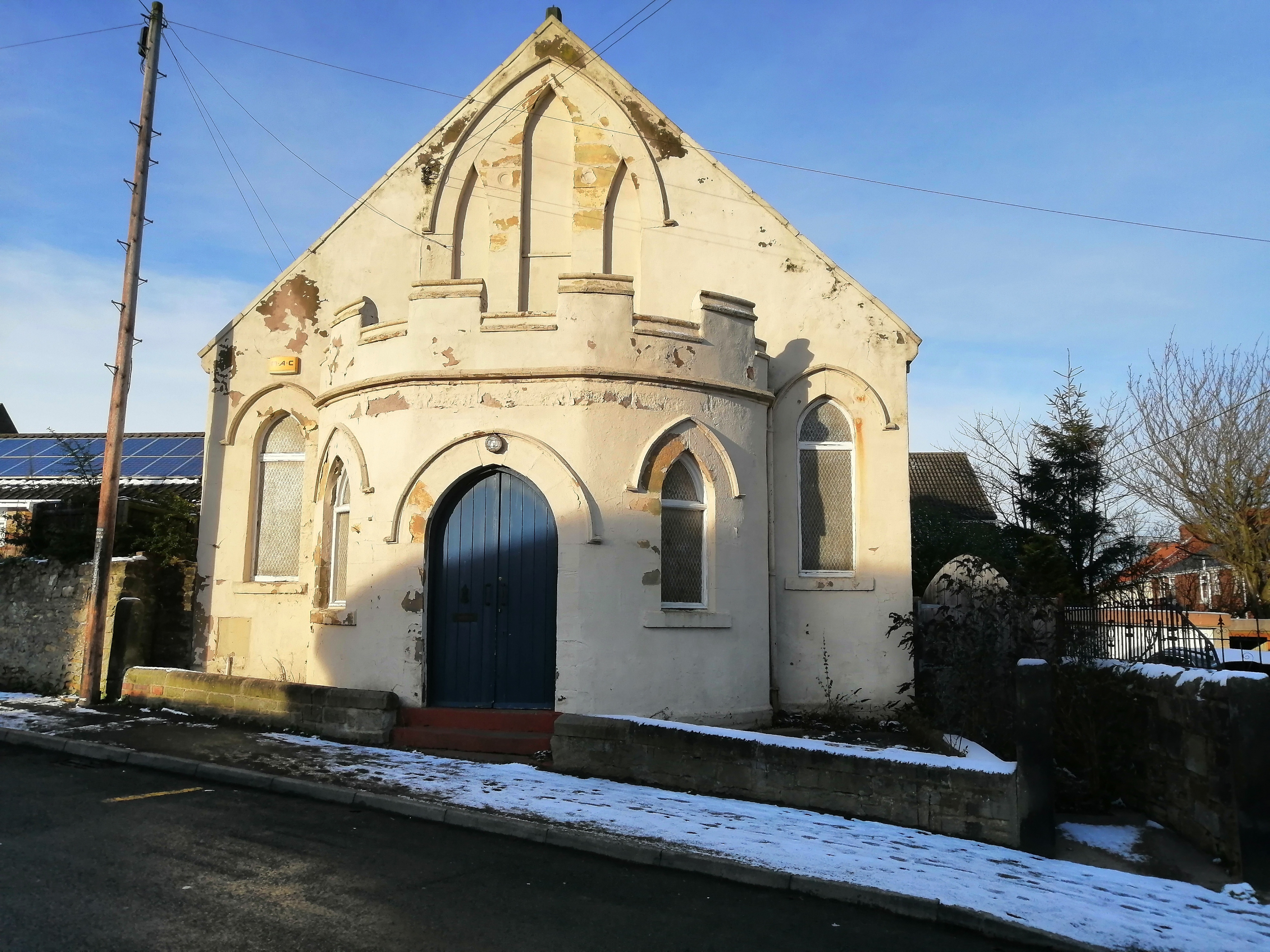
Bethany Chapel, now closed, to the east of Catchgate Crossroads

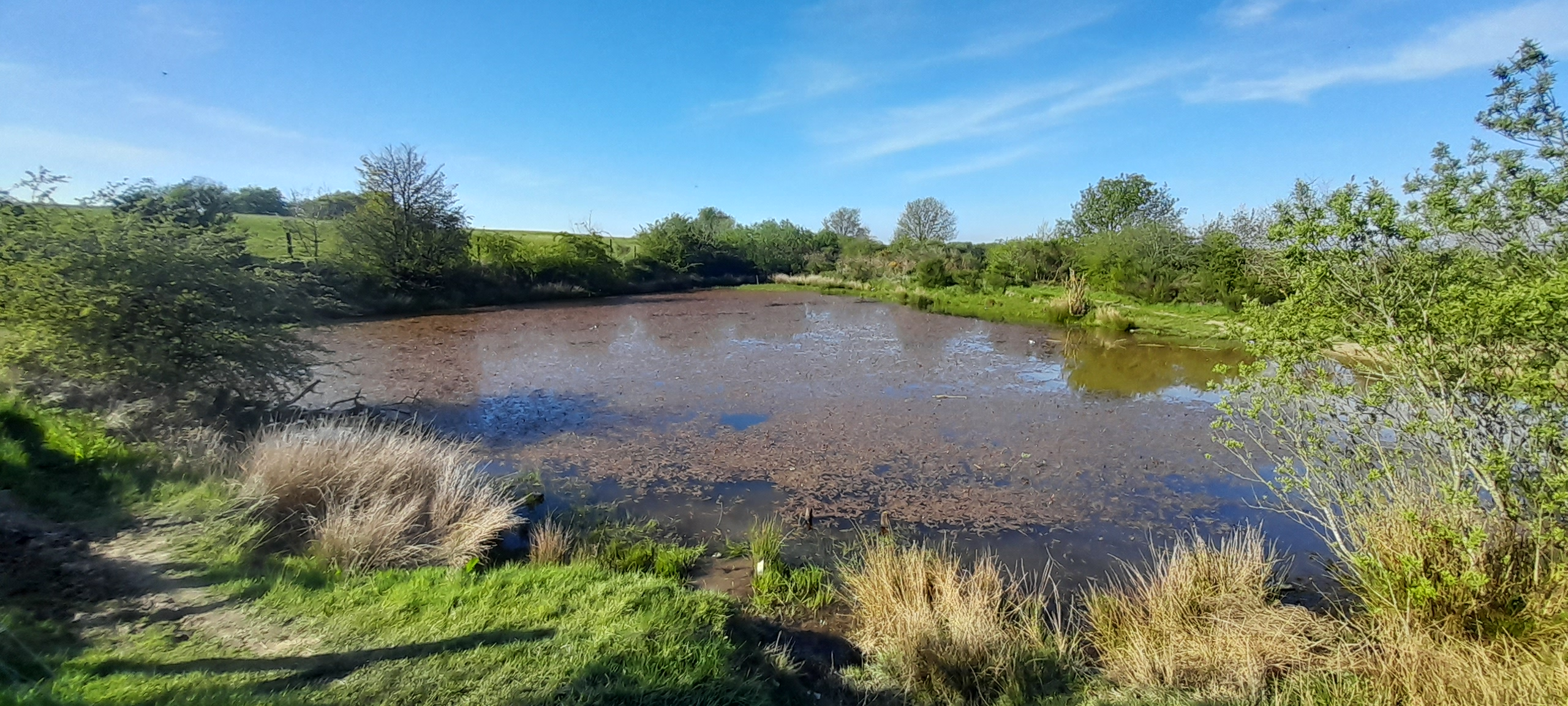
Carrmyers Pond, on boundary of Catchgate and Harelaw
