= Burnhope =

Village in County Durham, England

Coordinates: 54.828°N 1.709°W

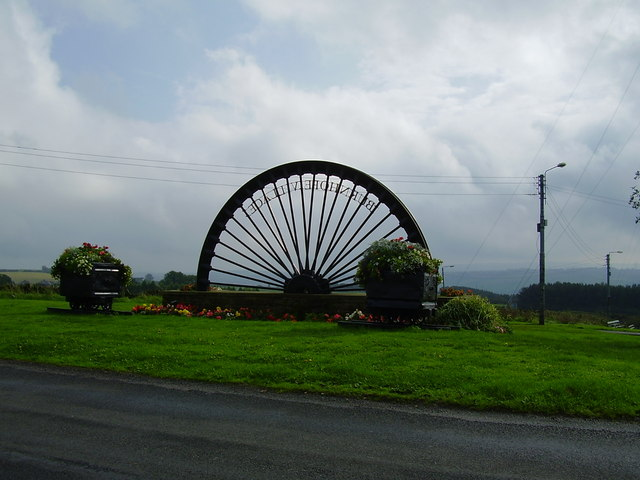
- Coal chauldrons and pit wheel sculpture at Burnhope. (Opened by MP Hilary Armstrong and two of the local school children, Mark Gray and Kerry Pinnington)

- Location within County Durham
- Population: 1,564 (2011)
- OS grid reference: NZ187482
- Unitary authority: County Durham
- Ceremonial county: County Durham
- Region: North East
- Country: England
- Sovereign state: United Kingdom
- Post town: DURHAM
- Postcode district: DH7
- Dialling code: 01207
- Police: Durham
- Fire: County Durham and Darlington
- Ambulance: North East
- UK Parliament: North West Durham

Burnhope is a village and civil parish in County Durham, England. It is located in the Craghead valley on the opposite side to Stanley and has 1,564 inhabitants, as measured in the 2011 census. Burnhope overlooks Lanchester in the Browney Valley, roughly two miles to the west and Maiden Law is roughly two miles north. Holmside is roughly two miles to the south east.

== The village ==
Burnhope is a village of contrasts, being home to many of the area's poorest and richest people (among them, children's author Terry Deary). In 2003 two wind turbines were erected in a field between the village and nearby Craghead, creating a new landmark to accompany the transmission mast. Burnhope is the only place that the Durham Miners' Gala has been held apart from Durham. This was in 1926 the year of the General Strike when it was banned at Durham so it was moved to Burnhope. In 1986 a 60th anniversary was held to mark this event.

The school was run in 1921 by William Jacques Warwick, with his wife Emmeline teaching in the Infants Department.

Burnhope has increased in size rapidly within the last few years with over 120 new homes being built by developer, Keepmoat Homes.

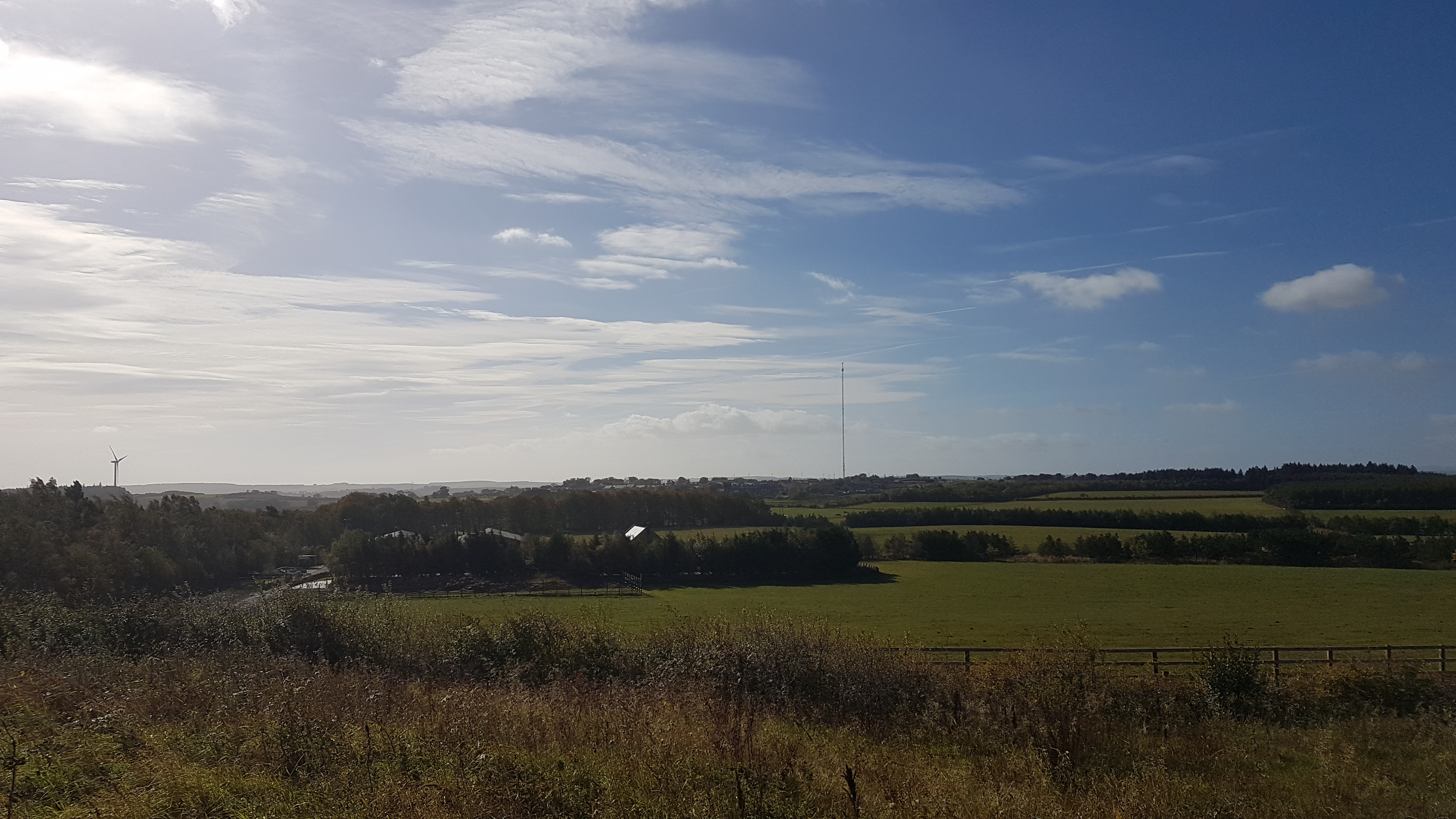
Burnhope from Springwell Farm with Burnhope Television Mast on the horizon

== Langley Hall ==
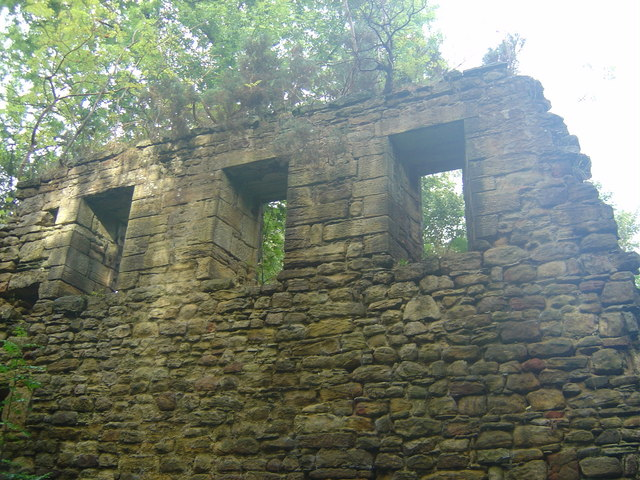
Langley Hall

Two miles south-east are the ruins of Langley Hall, a 16th-century fortified manor house. Built for Henry Scrope, 7th Baron Scrope of Bolton it probably consisted of three ranges around a courtyard with a moat. After Scropes' death the estate passed down his family until Emanuel Scrope, 1st Earl of Sunderland, 11th Baron Scrope of Bolton. With Emanuel's death in 1630 the hall and estate fell into disrepair.
