= Iveston =

Village in County Durham, England

Coordinates: 54°50′14″N 1°35′15″W

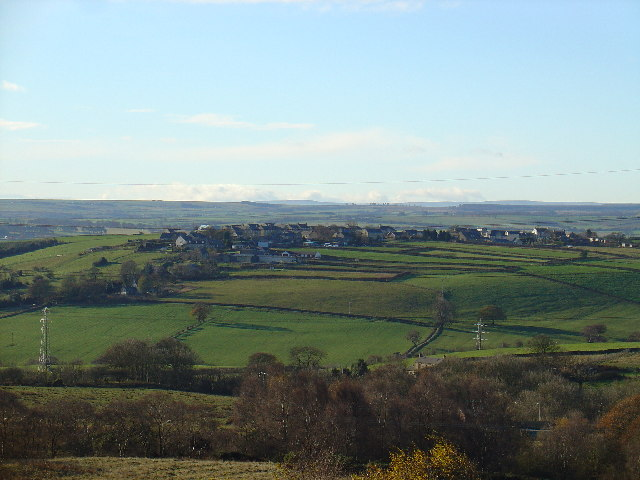

- Location within County Durham
- Unitary authority: County Durham
- Ceremonial county: Durham
- Region: North East
- Country: England
- Sovereign state: United Kingdom

Iveston is a village in County Durham, England. It is situated a short distance to the east of Consett. Housing in the area consists of a mixture of traditional cottages and large, newer residential properties. Historically, farming and mining formed the chief sources of employment in the village. In 1931 the parish had a population of 6395.

First documented in the Boldon Book as Ivestan. The village is also listed in Bishop Hatfield’s survey (1381) as Ivestane.

Little is known about the prehistory of the Iveston area. In fact no certain remains from this period have been found at all. It was once thought that 'Castle Hill' might be the sight of an Iron Age hillfort. However, the remains at this site are simply those of an early-19th-century quarry. The hill itself is a spoil tip from the quarry. The only object to have been found here is a 17th-century shoe buckle. More likely to be of prehistoric date is the enclosure shown by cropmarks, which was excavated in 1963. Although no dating evidence was found, this is not surprising as many prehistoric sites produce very few finds.

The Romans arrived in County Durham in the 1st century and swiftly defended their newly captured territory by building a series of forts and connecting them with a network of roads. It is thought that the course of Dere Street ran through this area connecting the forts such as Binchester with Hadrian's Wall. A number of Roman coins have also been discovered- at least one was of mid-3rd century date. It is likely that there was other Roman activity in the area which remains to be discovered.

Little is known about the area between the Roman period and the medieval period, although the name Iveston is of Old English origin suggesting that there was a village here during the Anglo-Saxon period. In fact little is known about the village until the 14th century when it is recorded that a chapel dedicated to St Margaret was built by the monks of the abbey of St Mary at Blanchland. However, after the dissolution it was used for agricultural purposes and finally demolished to use the stone for a farmhouse. All that can be seen today are the remains of a roughly rectangular earth platform.

Coal mining probably became important in the area as early as the 15th century; coal mines are recorded in 1440. Further mines are recorded between 1611 and 1703, but like the rest of Durham it was really the 19th century that saw the massive expansion of coal mining in the area. Iveston Colliery itself was sunk in 1839 and closed in 1892. The colliery was served by the Iveston Railway.

The Roman road of Dere Street, locally following the route of the A691 from Consett and Leadgate onward to Lanchester and Durham, passes through the south of the village. However, most of the village lies on an unclassified road called Iveston Lane heading north through the village from a junction with the A691 at The New Pavilion Chinese restaurant, formerly the Iveston Inn public house. Iveston Lane passes through the village green, before descending steeply down a bank locally well known with cyclists and joggers / runners with a gradient of 15% to the north of the village. This lane then terminates at a junction with Lund's Lane and Stoneyheap Lane.

A further unclassified road heads north from the A691 at the south end of Iveston across a narrow gully and connecting with the north end of Delves Lane.

== Civil parish ==
Iveston was formerly a township in the parish of Lanchester, from 1866 Iveston was a civil parish in its own right, on 1 April 1937 the parish was abolished and merged with Consett and Stanley.
