= Liam Dixon =

English cricketer (born 1993)

Personal information
- Full name: Liam Dixon
- Born: 26 April 1993 (age 33); Durham, County Durham, England
- Batting: Right-handed
- Bowling: Right-arm medium

Domestic team information
- Years: Team
- 2014: Durham MCCU
- 2016–2017: Northumberland

Career statistics
Competition	First-class
Matches	2
Runs scored	1
Batting average	0.50
100s/50s	–/–
Top score	1
Balls bowled	197
Wickets	5
Bowling average	36.60
5 wickets in innings	–
10 wickets in match	–
Best bowling	3/92
Catches/stumpings	–/–
- Source: Cricinfo, 14 June 2019

Liam Dixon (born 26 April 1993) is an English former first-class cricketer.

Dixon was born at Durham and educated in the city at the Stanley College of Technology (now known as North Durham Academy). From there he attended the College of St Hild and St Bede at Durham University. While studying at Durham University, Dixon played first-class cricket for Durham MCCU, making two appearances in 2014 against Derbyshire at Derby, and Durham at Chester-le-Street. A right-arm medium pace bowler, Dixon took 5 wickets at an average of 36.60, with best figures of 3 for 92. He debuted in minor counties cricket for Northumberland in the 2016 MCCA Knockout Trophy, with Dixon making four appearances in the competition in 2016 and one in 2017.
