= Flint Hill, County Durham =

Village in County Durham, England

Coordinates: 54.883°N 1.747°W

- Location within County Durham
- OS grid reference: NZ163543
- Unitary authority: County Durham
- Ceremonial county: County Durham
- Region: North East
- Country: England
- Sovereign state: United Kingdom
- Post town: DURHAM
- Postcode district: DH9
- Dialling code: 01207
- Police: Durham
- Fire: County Durham and Darlington
- Ambulance: North East
- UK Parliament: Blaydon and Consett

Flint Hill is a small village in County Durham, England. It is situated to the north of Annfield Plain.
