= Maiden Law =

Village in County Durham, England

Coordinates: 54.841°N 1.733°W

Maiden Law is a small village in County Durham, England. It is situated to the north of Lanchester, on the road to Annfield Plain.
