= Dipton, County Durham =

Village in County Durham, England

Coordinates: 54°53′N 1°45′W

- village
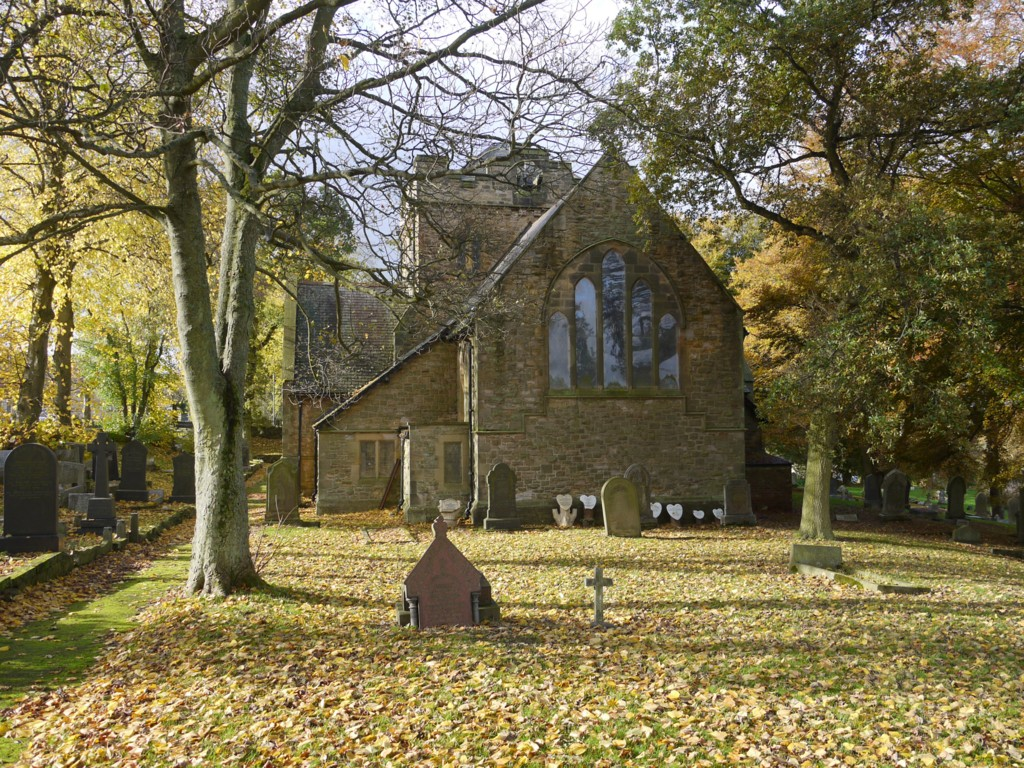
- The Parish Church of St John the Evangelist
- Unitary authority: County Durham
- Ceremonial county: County Durham
- Region: North East
- Country: England
- Sovereign state: United Kingdom
- Post town: STANLEY
- Postcode district: DH9
- Police: Durham
- Fire: County Durham and Darlington
- Ambulance: North East

Dipton is a village located in County Durham, England. It is situated to the north-east of Consett, 3 miles south west of Burnopfield and a short distance to the north-west of Annfield Plain.

The village runs along the A692 road. Originally a series of hamlets and settlements such as Pontop, West Nook, Colliery Dykes and the township of Collierley, by 1820 the name Dipton was applied to the area.

There was a chapel at Collierley in the 13th century. In c.1221 Kepier Hospital agreed to build a chapel at Collierley. The church is mentioned again in 1534 and in 1637 the inhabitants of the village had to repair the churchyard wall. By 1770 it was in ruins. The chapel stood on what is now the farm at Collierley in "Chapel field" (and noted on ordnance survey maps).

The Church of England parish church, dedicated to St John the Evangelist, was built 1885-6 by the firm Oliver and Leeson. A fire in 1963 led to some damage in the chancel and south chapel. The church was closed and decommissioned in 2013.

There is a Roman Catholic church dedicated to St Patrick. Founded in 1907 it was built of timber and iron on a site acquired from Lord Ninian Crichton-Stuart (owner of a coal mine in the area). The church was burned down in 1964 and in 1967-8 replaced by another church to the design of local architect Anthony Joseph Rossi (1916-71).

Pontop Hall is a late 16th early 17th century house with later additions. The manor belonged to John de Gourlay and according to Bishop Hatfield's survey of 1377 belonged to William de Gourlay. The estate passed through many families including the Claxtons, Meaburnes and Swinburnes. From 1748 to 1802 the attic acted as a Roman Catholic chapel. The hall also acted as a refuge for students from the seminary at Douai before their move to Crook Hall.

Coal mining is documented in the area from the 14th century. The main collieries in the area were, the South Medomsley Pit (Pontop Hall colliery) opened 1867 and closed 1980 which used the Annie and Mary shafts; the Dipton colliery (also known as the Delight colliery) operating 1855-1940; and the Lily colliery disused by the 1890s.

The local village school is called Collierley Primary School. Very little housing development occurred in the 1980s, but new housing estates have been built in the village over the last 10 years, which in turn have sustained a younger generation of villagers.

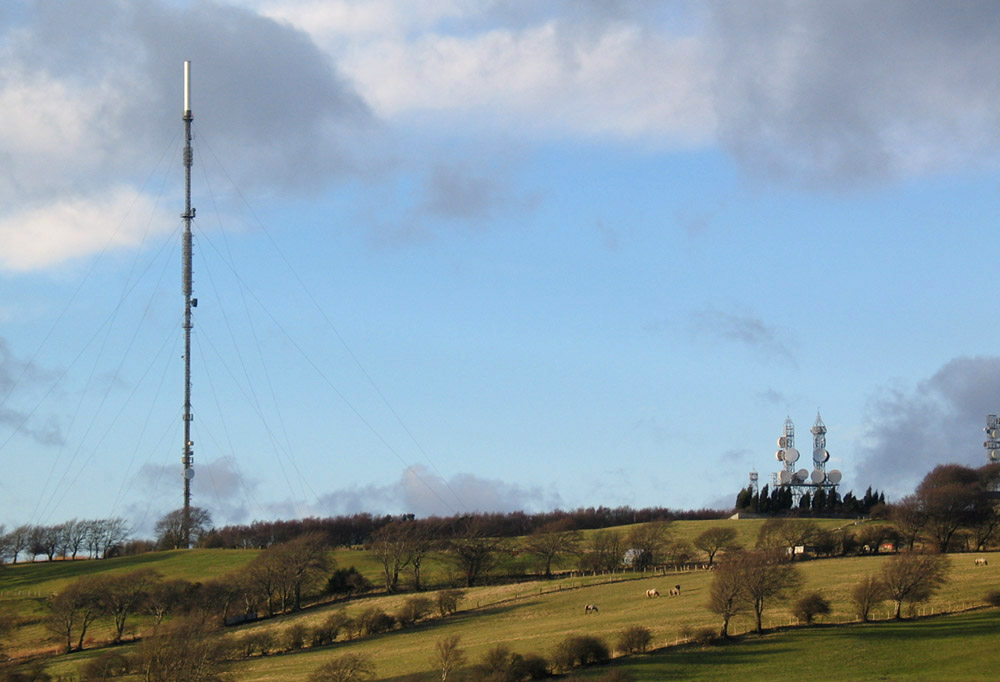
Pontop Pike transmission mast stands near Dipton

It is close to the Pontop Pike Television Transmitter.
