= Annfield Plain =

Coordinates: 54°51′25″N 1°44′13″W

- Village
- Location within County Durham
- Population: 7,774 (2011.ward)
- OS grid reference: NZ169514
- Unitary authority: County Durham
- Ceremonial county: County Durham
- Region: North East
- Country: England
- Sovereign state: United Kingdom
- Post town: STANLEY
- Postcode district: DH9
- Dialling code: 01207
- Police: Durham
- Fire: County Durham and Darlington
- Ambulance: North East
- UK Parliament: North Durham

Annfield Plain is a village in County Durham, in England. It is situated on a plateau between the towns of Stanley, 3 mi (4.8 km) to the north-east, and Consett, 5 mi (8.0 km) to the west. According to the 2001 census, Annfield Plain had a population of 3,569. By the time of the 2011 Census Annfield Plain had become a ward of Stanley parish. The ward had a population of 7,774. Along with much of the surrounding area, Annfield Plain's history was coal mining.

Much of the surrounding landscape is rough moorland, dominated by the nearby Pontop Pike television mast. Not far from semi-rural Derwentside, however, is the Tyneside–Wearside conurbation, with Newcastle 12 mi (19 km) away, and Sunderland a similar distance. The cathedral city of Durham is 10 mi (16 km) away and offers quite a contrast to the former pit villages in the area of Annfield Plain.

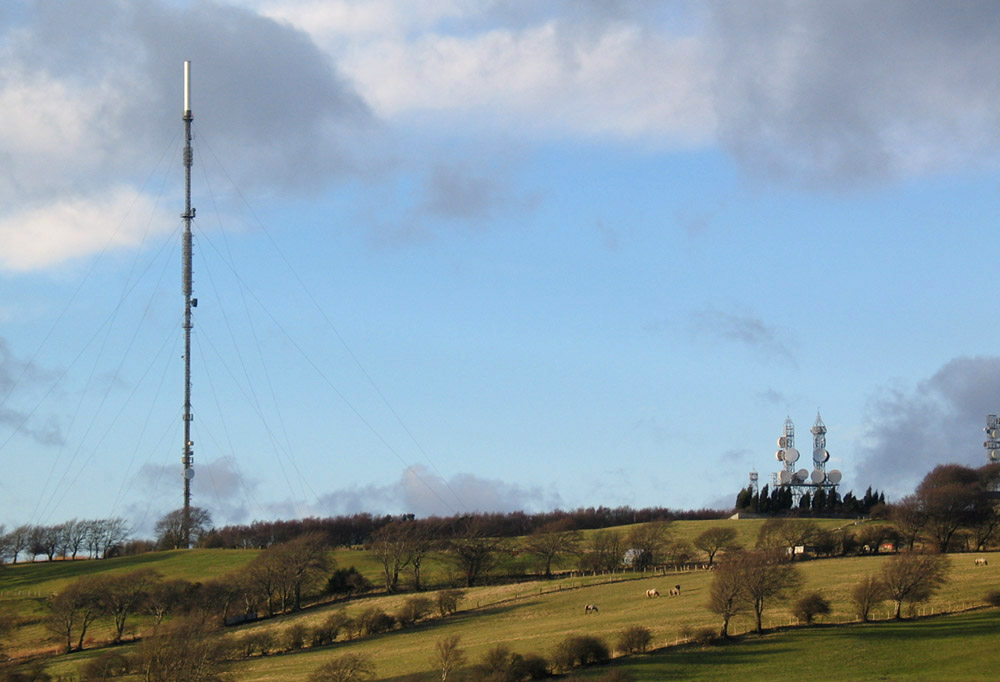
Pontop Pike transmission mast, overlooking Annfield Plain to the north west.

== Name ==
"Anfield", as the name was originally appears to derive from "the fields of An", referring to a man who lived before the Norman Conquest. The "Plain" part of the name was originally "Plane" and appears to refer originally not to the plateau on which the village stands but to the inclined plane on the Stanhope and Tyne Railway of 1834 (now the basis of the eastern end of the C2C cycle route passing through Annfield Plain, from neighbouring Greencroft through to Stanley). The engine used by the plane was known as the Anfield Engine because of its proximity to Anfield House, built in the 18th century on nearby Loud Hill. The spelling changed to "Annfield Plain" around 1856, when houses were built for miners on the nearby plateau.

== History ==
The earliest hard evidence of habitation in the area comes from the 16th century, when the main economic activity was sheep farming. The village's association with mining begins in the late 17th century when many shallow mines were dug. The Stanhope and Tyne Railway, laid in 1834, assisted the transportation of coal. Several limekilns were built at this time and were fuelled by local coal, with limestone being brought in by rail.

Demand for coal increased with the advent of the Industrial Revolution, and a number of deep pits were sunk over the course of the 19th century. The village grew substantially and light industry increased, including the construction of a brewery, mill, and candle factory; as well as various services for the population, including a school, church, at least two nonconformist chapels, and a variety of shops.

In the 19th century Annfield Plain was the scene of a murder, when a man named William Thompson killed his wife. He was hanged at Durham prison on 5 January 1874.³

Annfield Plain Golf Club (now defunct) was founded in 1907. The club closed in 1931.

Greencroft Comprehensive School (later Greencroft School) was the main secondary school in Annfield Plain between 1965 and 2013, split between sites at New Kyo and Greencroft (see Greencroft for more information). It was merged with Stanley School of Technology in 2011 to form North Durham Academy then closed in 2013 when pupils were moved to the new campus in Stanley.

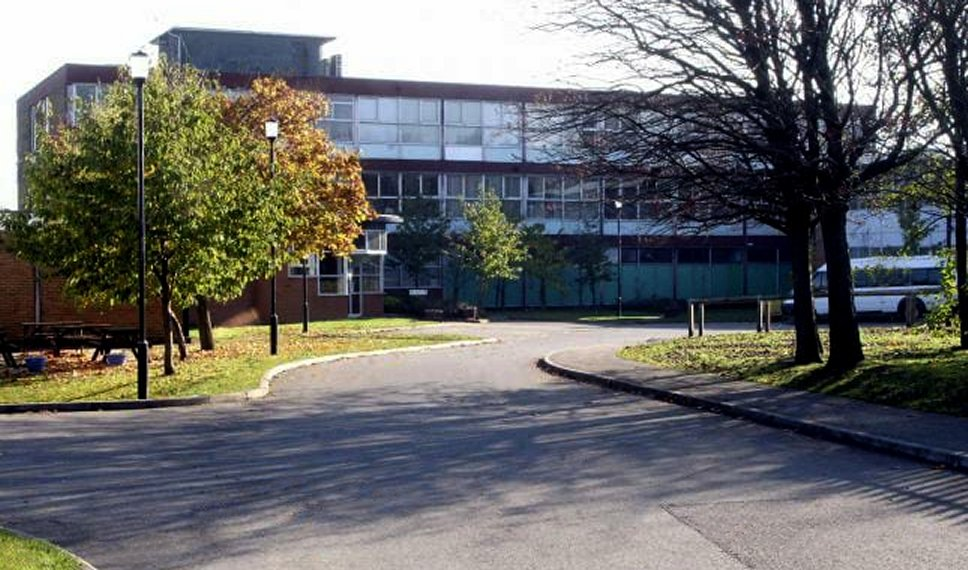
The former Greencroft Comprehensive School, Greencroft, County Durham.

== Present day ==
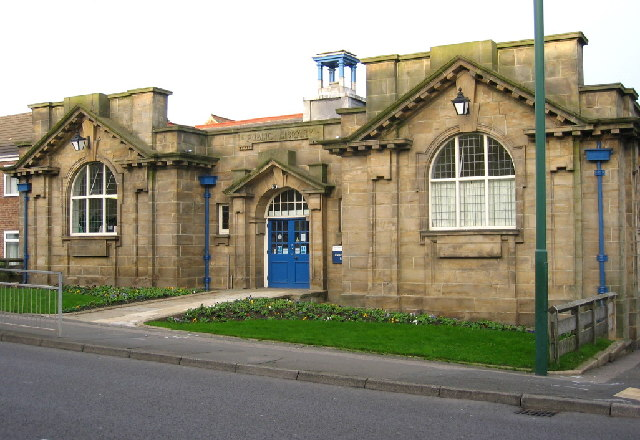
Annfield Plain Public Library, actually located in Catchgate

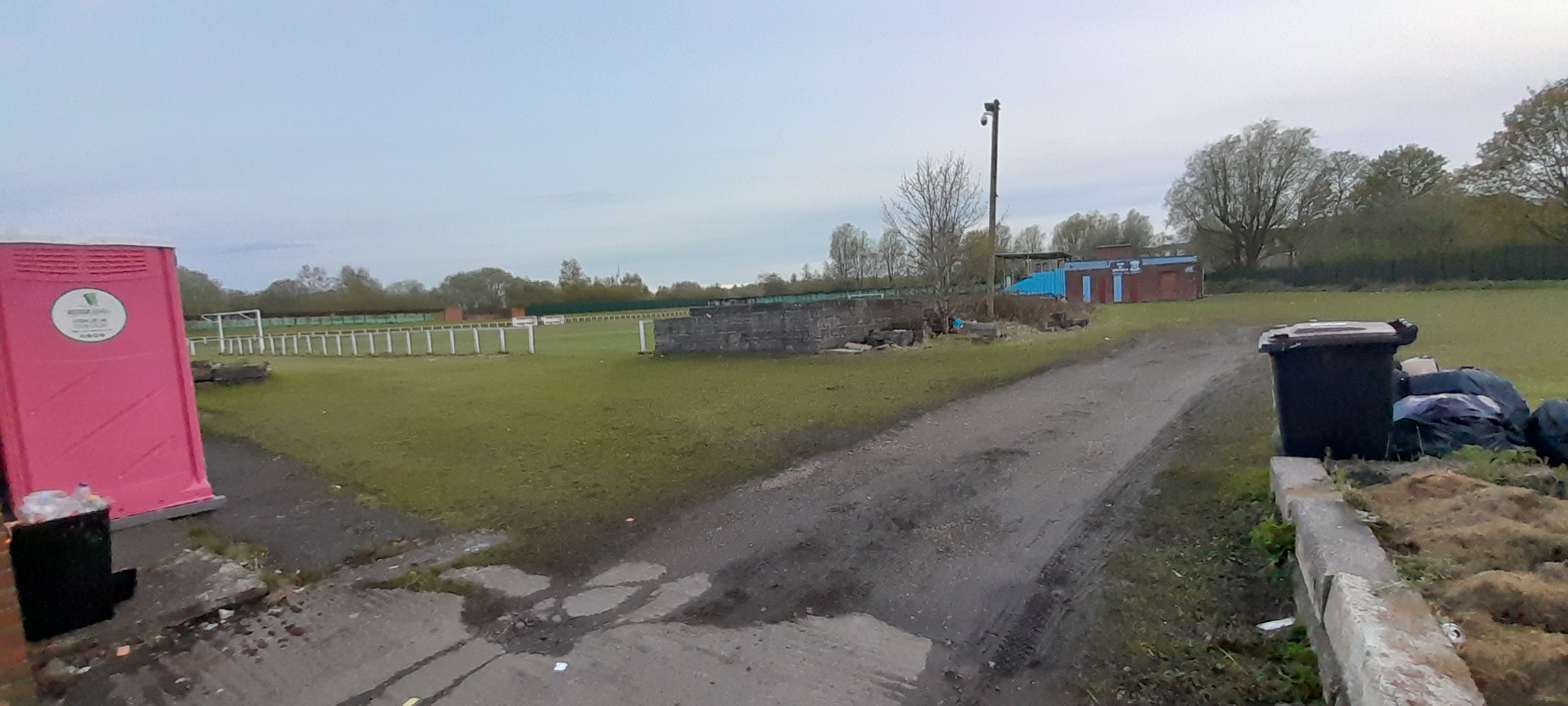
Derwent Park Stadium, home of Annfield Plain Football Club

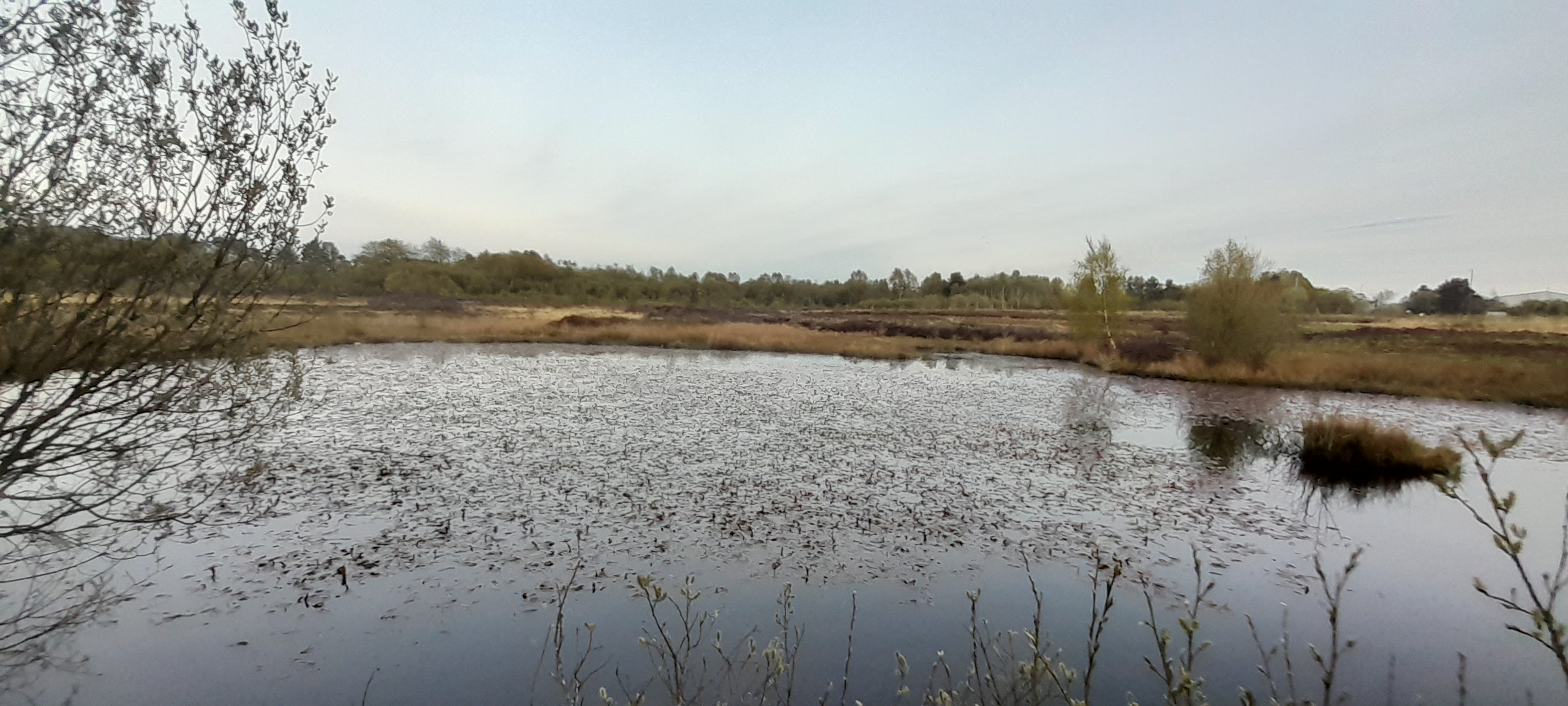
Alexander Pond, Greencroft Nature Reserve

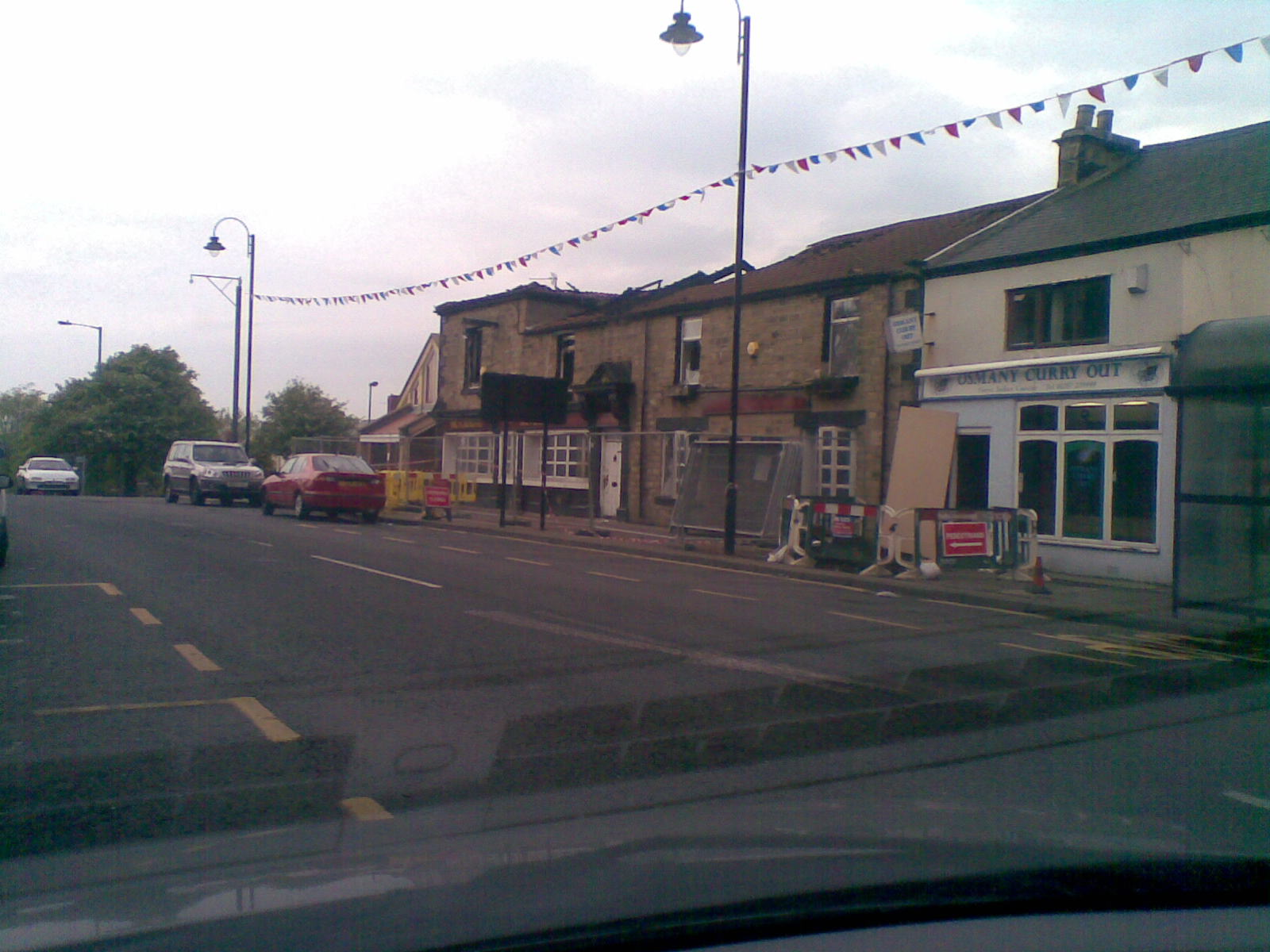
The Plainsman, a former pub just before its demolition in 2009.

Annfield Plain is centered on what used to be the junction of the former A693 between Consett and Stanley (now bypassing Annfield Plain to the south west) and the B6168, heading north towards Catchgate and Flint Hill. The A6076 additionally heads south west towards Maiden Law and Lanchester.

While there is some light industry (mostly at nearby Greencroft Industrial Park), most of Annfield Plain is made up of housing, village shops, a working man's club and two remaining pubs (Coach and Horses, and the Queen's Head – the Smugglers Arms closed in the 1990s and the Plainsman ceased trading and was demolished in 2009).

The local Tesco (formally Co-operative) Co-op supermarket was commonly known as the Disco, an allusion to its former name: the Annfield Plain Co-op and Discount Electricals. The supermarket was converted to a Tesco store in October 2007. The original Annfield Plain co-operative store was dismantled and rebuilt at the nearby Beamish Open Air Museum in the late 1980s. The site of the village's main pit, the Busty, is now a privately owned coach garage.

Annfield Plain Public Library is situated on and just over the boundary with Catchgate to the north west.

The C2C cycle route passes directly through Annfield Plain to the south of Tesco on its way from Whitehaven in Cumbria on the west coast, to Sunderland on the east coast, following the route of the former Stanhope and Tyne Railway. The C2C enters Annfield Plain from the east from Oxhill and Stanley. It leaves via a footbridge over the A693 to the south into Greencroft Industrial Estate after passing Annfield Plain Park before turning west towards Greencroft proper.

Annfield Plain F.C., based at Derwent Park Stadium, is situated on the south west side of Annfield Plain, backing onto Greencroft Nature Reserve and Alexander Pond. Annfield Plain Cricket Club is located on the west side of the village within Greencroft.

Annfield Plain Park, on the south side of the village, contains tennis courts on its northern corner, a bowling green, a children's play area, a basic basketball court, a war memorial and a green area with football pitches.

== Geography ==
=== Administration ===
Annfield Plain is located in the County Durham unitary authority area. It is represented on Durham County Council by Michele Hodgson and Thomas Nearney (both Labour). The village is part of the North Durham parliamentary constituency, which as of 2005 is represented in parliament by Kevan Jones (Labour).

The local police force is Durham Constabulary. Annfield Plain is in the Derwentside division and its nearest police station is in Catchgate.

=== Location ===
1. Elevation: 250 m (850 ft);
2. Rail access: Chester-le-Street, 11 km (6.8 mi) by road - historically, the Stanhope and Tyne Railway passed through it.
3. Cycle Access: The C2C cross-country cycle route from Sunderland to Whitehaven in Cumbria passes through Annfield Plain.
4. Road access:
- A693 between Stanley and Consett, which used to pass through Annfield Plain and now bypasses it.
- A6076 towards Lanchester.
- B6168 towards Catchgate and Flint Hill, where it joins the A692 towards Newcastle-upon-Tyne.

=== Nearby places ===
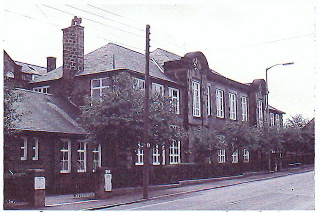
Annfield Plain Intermediate School, later Greencroft Comprehensive Lower School, in New Kyo, 1994

Surrounding Annfield Plain and effectively joined to it are several other villages:

- Greencroft to the west
- New Kyo to the east
- West Kyo and Catchgate to the north

== Notable people ==
- Alun Armstrong - original cast member of Les Misérables, playing Monsieur Thénardier. Also in New Tricks and The Mummy Returns
- Joseph Crawford - President of the Trades Union Congress and General Secretary of the National Association of Colliery Overmen, Deputies and Shotfirers
- Darren Grimes - political commentator and Reform UK Councillor for the Annifield Plain ward since 2025
- Micky Horswill- former footballer
- Tom Lamb - former miner who became an artist, depicting the scenes of underground life for miners
- Glenn McCrory - former Cruiserweight World Champion boxer
