= North Durham Academy =

Location
- High Street; Stanley, County Durham, DH9 0TW; England; 54.8716°N 1.69011°W

Information
- Type: Academy
- Local authority: Durham
- Department for Education URN: 136745 Tables
- Ofsted: Reports
- Principal: Gemma Knox
- Gender: Coeducational
- Age: 11 to 16
- Website: http://www.northdurhamacademy.co.uk/

North Durham Academy is a secondary school with academy status based in Stanley in County Durham, England.

The school was formed in September 2011, when Greencroft Business and Enterprise Community School (also known as Greencroft Comprehensive School and just Greencroft School) and Stanley School of Technology (former South Stanley Comprehensive School) formally merged. Tanfield School opted not to take part in the merger and remains a separate entity.

It opened its new £30 million campus in September 2013, but was not officially opened until March 2014 by the Duke of York, KG.

In 2013 and 2015, Ofsted inspectors rated the academy as 'requires improvement'.

== School performance and inspections ==
As of 2026, the school's most recent inspection by Ofsted was in 2022, with an outcome of Good.

== Notable alumni ==
- Liam Dixon (born 1993), cricketer
