= DH postcode area =

Postcode area within the United Kingdom

Durham
- Postcode area
- Coordinates: 54.826°N 1.619°W
- Country: United Kingdom
- Postcode area: DH
- Postcode area name: Durham
- Post towns: 5
- Postcode districts: 12
- Postcode sectors: 47
- Postcodes (live): 8,971
- Postcodes (total): 11,453
- Statistics as at May 2020

The DH postcode area, also known as the Durham postcode area, is a group of nine postcode districts in north-east England, within five post towns. These cover northern County Durham (including Durham, Chester-le-Street, Consett and Stanley), parts of southern Tyne and Wear (including Houghton-le-Spring) and a small part of southern Northumberland.

Mail for the DH postcode area is processed at Tyneside Mail Centre in Gateshead, along with mail for the DL, NE, SR and TS postcode areas.

== Coverage ==
The approximate coverage of the postcode districts:

Postcode district	Post town	Coverage	Local authority area(s)
DH1	DURHAM	Durham	County Durham
DH2	CHESTER LE STREET	Chester-le-Street (west of East Coast Main Line), Ouston, Pelton, Birtley (west of East Coast Main Line)	County Durham, Gateshead
DH3	CHESTER LE STREET	Chester-le-Street (east of East Coast Main Line), Great Lumley, Birtley (east of East Coast Main Line)	County Durham, Gateshead
DH4	HOUGHTON LE SPRING	Houghton-le-Spring (west of A690), Penshaw, Shiney Row, West Rainton	Sunderland, County Durham
DH5	HOUGHTON LE SPRING	Houghton-le-Spring (east of A690), Hetton-le-Hole, East Rainton	Sunderland, County Durham
DH6	DURHAM	South Hetton, Haswell, Shotton Colliery, Ludworth, Shadforth, Sherburn, Littletown, Kelloe, Coxhoe, Bowburn, Cassop, Pittington, Thornley, Wheatley Hill	County Durham
DH7	DURHAM	Brandon, Lanchester, Esh Winning, Burnhope, Langley Park, Sacriston, Ushaw Moor, Brancepeth	County Durham
DH8	CONSETT	Consett, Blackhill, Bridgehill, Shotley Bridge, Leadgate, Delves Lane	County Durham, Northumberland
DH9	STANLEY	Dipton, Stanley, Annfield Plain	County Durham
DH97	DURHAM	HM Passport Office	non-geographic
DH98	DURHAM	BT	non-geographic
DH99	DURHAM	National Savings and Investments	non-geographic

== Map ==
DH postcode area map, showing postcode districts in red and post towns in grey text, with links to nearby DL, NE, SR and TS postcode areas.

== See also ==
- List of postcode areas in the United Kingdom
- Postcode Address File
