= Leadgate, County Durham =

Village in England

Coordinates: 54.861°N 1.807°W

- Village
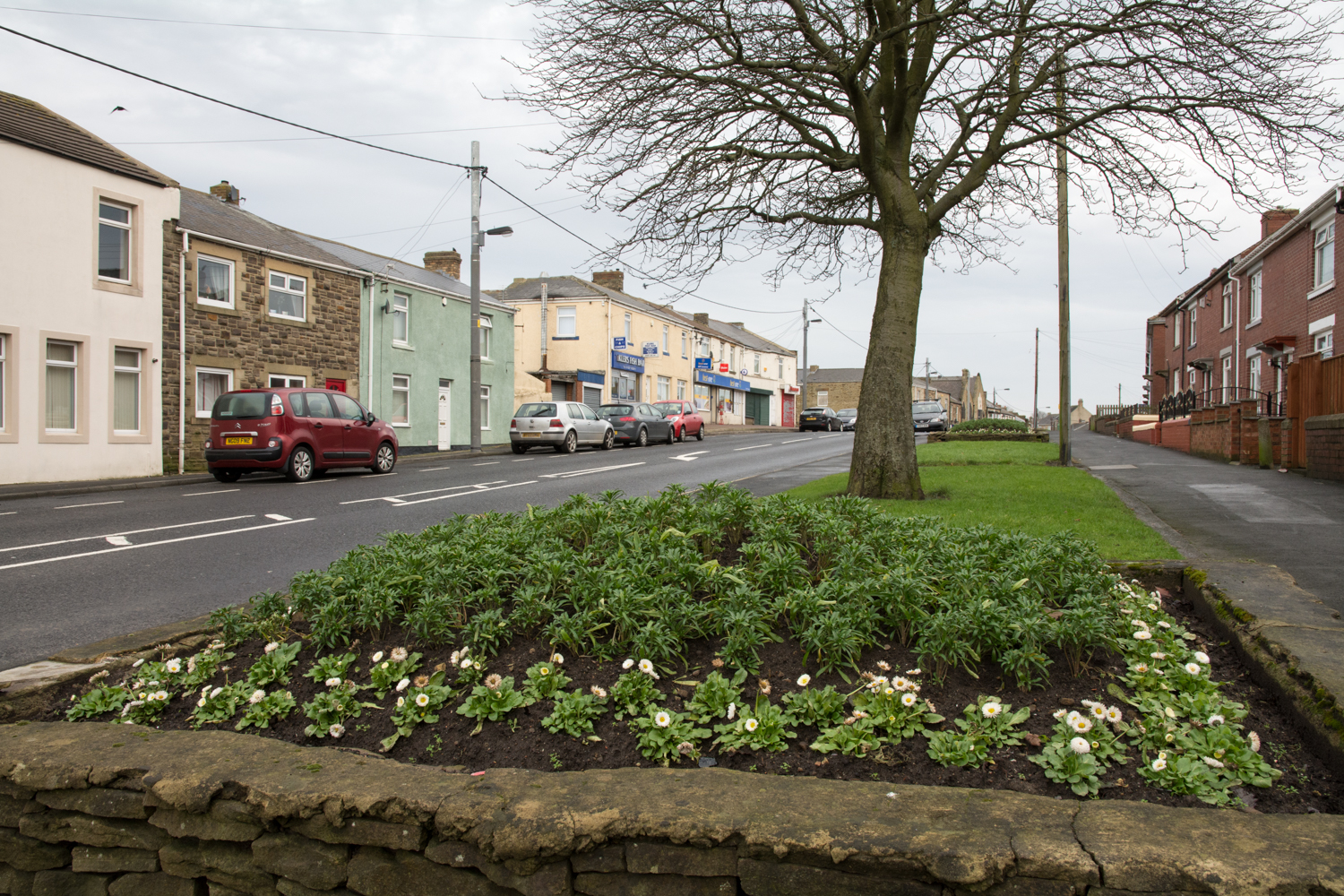
- Leadgate, Front Street
- Population: 3,338 Census 2021
- OS grid reference: NZ117514
- Region: North East
- Country: England
- Sovereign state: United Kingdom
- Ambulance: North East

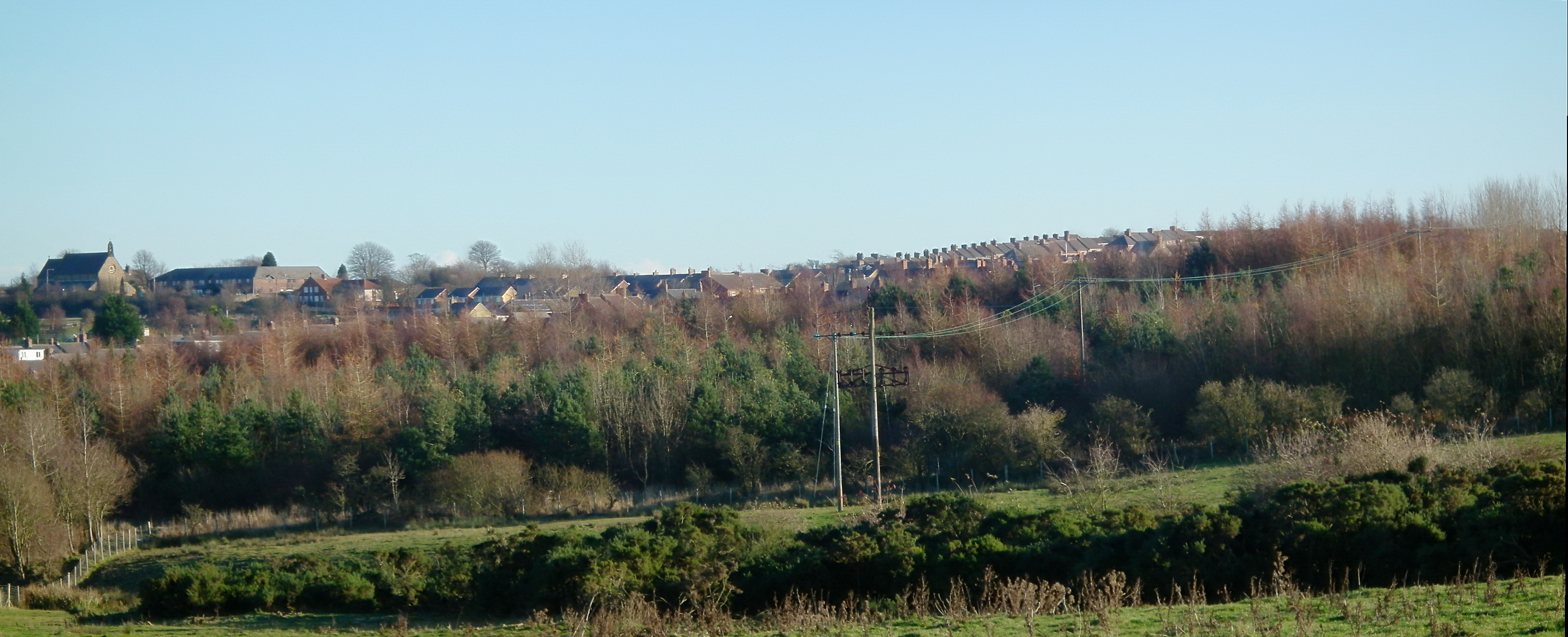
View of Leadgate, Durham County

Leadgate is a village in County Durham, in England. It is situated to the north-east of Consett. The Roman road Dere Street runs straight through the middle of Leadgate, today this is known as Durham Road and the B6309.

The place-name 'Leadgate' is first attested in 1590 and derives from the Old English 'hlidgeat', which means 'swing-gate'.

The Church of England parish church of St Ives was built in 1865–68 by Charles Hodgson Fowler. The Roman Catholic church of Our Blessed Lady and St. Joseph lies a little way out of the village at Brooms. It was built 1866-69 by E. W. Pugin and served the Irish migrant community. Brooms was the birthplace of Thomas Smith (1763-1831), Roman Catholic bishop.

Leadgate was the home of the workers and staff of the Eden colliery which opened in 1844, and was closed on the 18 July 1980. There was a smaller coal mine at Bradley Colliery which seems to have closed before 1875. Leadgate was also home to many working for the Consett Iron Company (about 2 miles away) and which closed in the 1980s. On the current site of Bradley Workshops there was also the Bradley Iron Works which seems to have operated between 1856 and 1866 being taken over by the Consett Iron Company.

Leadgate now stands as a small village with a close-knit community. Plans to regenerate the area have been on the local councils' planning board for some time and improvements are being made.

The retail economy of Leadgate is centered on Front Street which until the construction of the Leadgate bypass formed one of the main routes from Newcastle into Consett. Front Street hosts a number of independent businesses as well as a local co-operative.

The coast-to-coast cycle route runs through Leadgate and follows the path of the former Stanhope and Tyne railway. The last train ran on the line on 17 March 1984.

On 17 August 2020 the Bradley open-cast mine, the last coal mine in England, was closed.
