= List of churches in Hartlepool =

The following is a list of churches in the Borough of Hartlepool in County Durham, England.

No active churches are known in the civil parishes of Dalton Piercy, Brierton, Claxton and Newton Bewley.

The borough has an estimated 37 churches for 92,500 inhabitants, a ratio of one church to every 2,500 people.

Name	Civil parish/n'hood	Web	Dedication	Founded	Denomination	Benefice	Notes
St Mary Magdalene, Hart	Hart		Mary Magdalene	Medieval	Church of England	Hart & Elwick	
St Peter, Elwick	Elwick		Peter	Medieval	Church of England	Hart & Elwick	
St John the Baptist, Greatham	Greatham		John the Baptist	Medieval	Church of England		
St Hilda, Hartlepool	Headland		Hilda of Whitby	Medieval	Church of England		
Immaculate Conception, Hartlepool	Headland		Immaculate Conception	1834	Roman Catholic	Holy Family Parish	New building 1851
Headland Baptist Church	Headland			1843	Baptist Union		
St Mark, Hartlepool	Clavering		Mark		Church of England	Holy Trinity & St Mark	
Holy Trinity, Hartlepool	West View		Trinity	1852	Church of England	Holy Trinity & St Mark	New building 1958
St John Vianney, Hartlepool	West View		John Vianney	1961	Roman Catholic	Holy Family Parish	
West View Baptist Church	West View			1955	Baptist Union		
Living Waters Hartlepool	West View				Elim		
Central Estate Methodist Church	Central Estate				Methodist	United NE Methodist Circuit	New building 1995
St Oswald, Hartlepool	Hartlepool		Oswald of Northumbria	1904	Church of England		
St Luke, Hartlepool	Hartlepool		Luke	1916	Church of England		
St Thomas More, Hartlepool	Hartlepool		Thomas More	1953	Roman Catholic	Holy Family Parish	
Church of the Nazarene, Hartlepool	Hartlepool				Nazarene		
St Paul, Hartlepool	Grange		Paul	1885	Church of England		
St Joseph, Hartlepool	Grange		Joseph	1894	Roman Catholic	Holy Family Parish	
Grange Road Methodist Church	Grange			1886	Methodist	United NE Methodist Circuit	
St George's United Reformed Church, Hartlepool	Grange		George	1902	URC		Presbyterian meetings in the town from 1839
Hartlepool Salvation Army	Grange			1877	Salvation Army		
New Life Fellowship, Hartlepool	Grange			1927	Assemblies of God		
All Saints, Stranton	Stranton		All Saints	Medieval	Church of England	All Saints & Burbank	LEP with RC, URC and 2 Methodist churches
Burbank Community Church	Stranton				Church of England	All Saints & Burbank	Meets in Ward Jackson Primary School
Oasis Christian Fellowship	Stranton			1980	Pentecostal		
Grace Church Hartlepool	Stranton			2015	Independent		Meets in Stranton Centre
St Aidan, Hartlepool	Foggy Furze		Aidan of Lindisfarne	1890	Church of England	St Aidan & St Columba	
St Cuthbert, Hartlepool	Foggy Furze		Cuthbert	1928	Roman Catholic	Holy Family Parish	Permanent building 1955
Oxford Road Baptist Church	Foggy Furze			1914	Baptist Union		
Browning Avenue Baptist Church	Foggy Furze			1853	Grace Baptist		
Westbourne Methodist Church	Foggy Furze			1885	Methodist	United NE Methodist Circuit	New building 1906. Services in church hall from 2000
St Columba, Hartlepool	Rift House		Columba	1967	Church of England	St Aidan & St Columba	New building 2009
St James, Owton Manor	Owton Manor		James ?	1870	Church of England		Previously in Musgrave St, Stratton; moved to Owton Manor 1958
St Patrick, Hartlepool	Owton Manor		Patrick		Roman Catholic	Holy Family Parish	
Owton Manor Baptist Church	Owton Manor				Baptist Union		
Holy Trinity, Seaton Carew	Seaton Carew		Trinity	pre-1831	Church of England		Became church in its own right 1831
Seaton Carew Methodist Church	Seaton Carew			1937	Methodist	United NE Methodist Circuit	
