= List of civil parishes in County Durham =

The civil parishes of County Durham

This is a list of civil parishes in the ceremonial county of Durham, England. The towns of Stockton-on-Tees, Darlington and Hartlepool are the only unparished areas outside the administrative county. There are 181 civil parishes.

== Darlington ==
The former Darlington County Borough is unparished.

- Archdeacon Newton ^{10}
- Barmpton ^{10}
- Bishopton ^{10}
- Brafferton ^{10}
- Coatham Mundeville ^{10}
- Denton ^{10}
- East and West Newbiggin ^{10}
- Great Burdon ^{10}
- Great Stainton ^{10}
- Heighington ^{10}
- High Coniscliffe ^{10}
- Houghton le Side ^{10}
- Hurworth ^{10}
- Killerby ^{10}
- Little Stainton ^{10}
- Low Coniscliffe and Merrybent ^{10}
- Middleton St George ^{10}
- Morton Palms ^{10}
- Neasham ^{10}
- Piercebridge ^{10}
- Sadberge ^{10}
- Summerhouse ^{10}
- Walworth ^{10}
- Whessoe ^{10}

== County Durham ==
The former Chester le Street Urban District and Consett Urban District and parts of the former Bishop Auckland Urban District, Crook and Willington Urban District and Stanley Urban District are unparished. When the City of Durham parish was formed in 2018, three areas remained unparished as the boundaries were based on wards and not aligned to those of the surrounding parishes.

- Barforth ^{21}
- Barnard Castle (town)^{2}
- Barningham ^{21}
- Bearpark ^{12}
- Belmont ^{12}
- Bishop Auckland (town)^{3}
- Bishop Middleham ^{17}
- Bolam ^{1}
- Boldron ^{21}
- Bournmoor ^{5}
- Bowes ^{21}
- Bradbury and the Isle ^{17}
- Brancepeth ^{12}
- Brandon and Byshottles ^{4}
- Brignall ^{21}
- Burnhope ^{15}
- Cassop-cum-Quarrington ^{12}
- Castle Eden ^{13}
- Chilton (town)^{17}
- City of Durham ^{11}
- Cleatlam ^{1}
- Cockfield ^{1}
- Cornforth ^{17}
- Cornsay ^{15}
- Cotherstone ^{21}
- Coxhoe ^{12}
- Croxdale and Hett ^{12}
- Dalton-le-Dale ^{13}
- Dene Valley ^{3}
- Easington Colliery ^{13}
- Easington Village ^{13}
- Edmondbyers ^{25}
- Edmondsley ^{5}
- Eggleston ^{1}
- Egglestone Abbey ^{21}
- Eldon ^{18}
- Esh ^{15}
- Etherley ^{1}
- Evenwood and Barony ^{1}
- Ferryhill (town)^{17}
- Fishburn ^{17}
- Forest and Frith ^{1}
- Framwellgate Moor ^{12}
- Gainford ^{1}
- Gilmonby ^{21}
- Great Aycliffe (town)^{10} ^{17} ^{18}
- Great Lumley ^{5}
- Greater Willington (town)^{8}
- Greencroft ^{15}
- Hamsterley ^{1}
- Hamsterley Common ^{1}
- Haswell ^{13}
- Hawthorn ^{13}
- Headlam ^{1}
- Healeyfield ^{15}
- Hedleyhope ^{15}
- Hilton ^{1}
- Holwick ^{21}
- Hope ^{21}
- Horden ^{13}
- Hunderthwaite ^{21}
- Hunstanworth ^{25}
- Hutton Henry and Station Town ^{13}
- Hutton Magna ^{21}
- Ingleton ^{1}
- Kelloe ^{12}
- Kimblesworth and Plawsworth ^{5} ^{12}
- Lanchester ^{15}
- Langleydale and Shotton ^{1}
- Langton ^{1}
- Lartington ^{21}
- Little Lumley ^{5}
- Lunedale ^{21}
- Lynesack and Softley ^{1}
- Marwood ^{1}
- Mickleton ^{21}
- Middleton in Teesdale ^{1}
- Middridge ^{18}
- Monk Hesleden ^{13}
- Mordon ^{17}
- Morton Tinmouth ^{1}
- Muggleswick ^{15}
- Murton ^{13}
- Nesbitt ^{13}
- Newbiggin ^{1}
- North Lodge ^{5}
- Ouston ^{5}
- Ovington ^{21}
- Pelton ^{5}
- Peterlee (town)^{13}
- Pittington ^{12}
- Raby with Keverstone ^{1}
- Rokeby ^{21}
- Romaldkirk ^{21}
- Sacriston ^{5}
- Satley ^{15}
- Scargill ^{21}
- Seaham (town)^{16}
- Seaton with Slingley ^{13}
- Sedgefield (town)^{17}
- Shadforth ^{12}
- Sheraton with Hulam ^{13}
- Sherburn Village ^{12}
- Shildon (town)^{18}
- Shincliffe ^{12}
- Shotton ^{13}
- South Bedburn ^{1}
- South Hetton ^{13}
- Spennymoor (town)^{19}
- Staindrop ^{1}
- Stanhope ^{25}
- Stanley (town)^{20}
- Startforth ^{21}
- Streatlam and Stainton ^{1}
- Thornley ^{13}
- Tow Law (town)^{24}
- Trimdon ^{17}
- Trimdon Foundry ^{13}
- Urpeth ^{5}
- Waldridge ^{5}
- Wackerfield ^{1}
- Weather Hill Wood ^{4} ^{12}
- West Auckland ^{3}
- West Rainton and Leamside ^{12}
- Westwick ^{1}
- Wheatley Hill ^{13}
- Whorlton ^{1}
- Windlestone ^{17}
- Wingate ^{13}
- Winston ^{1}
- Witton Gilbert ^{12}
- Witton-le-Wear ^{8}
- Wolsingham ^{25}
- Wolsingham Park Moor ^{25}
- Woodland ^{1}
- Wycliffe with Thorpe ^{21}

== Hartlepool ==
Part of the former Hartlepool County Borough is unparished.

- Brierton ^{22}
- Claxton ^{22}
- Dalton Piercy ^{22}
- Elwick ^{22}
- Greatham ^{22}
- Hart ^{22}
- Headland ^{14}
- Newton Bewley ^{22}
- Wynyard

== Stockton-on-Tees ==
Part of the former Teesside County Borough is unparished. For the part of the borough south of the River Tees, see List of civil parishes in North Yorkshire.

- Aislaby ^{22}
- Billingham (town)^{23}
- Carlton ^{22}
- Egglescliffe ^{22}
- Elton ^{22}
- Grindon and Thorpe Thewles ^{22}
- Longnewton ^{22}
- Newsham ^{22}
- Preston-on-Tees ^{22}
- Redmarshall ^{22}
- Stillington and Whitton ^{17} ^{22}
- Wolviston ^{22}
- Wynyard ^{22}

== Notes ==
1. Formerly Barnard Castle Rural District
2. Formerly Barnard Castle Urban District
3. Formerly Bishop Auckland Urban District
4. Formerly Brandon and Byshottles Urban District
5. Formerly Chester-le-Street Rural District
6. Formerly Chester le Street Urban District
7. Formerly Consett Urban District
8. Formerly Crook and Willington Urban District
9. Formerly Darlington County Borough
10. Formerly Darlington Rural District
11. Formerly Durham Municipal Borough
12. Formerly Durham Rural District
13. Formerly Easington Rural District
14. Formerly Hartlepool County Borough
15. Formerly Lanchester Rural District
16. Formerly Seaham Urban District
17. Formerly Sedgefield Rural District
18. Formerly Shildon Urban District
19. Formerly Spennymoor Urban District
20. Formerly Stanley Urban District
21. Formerly Startforth Rural District
22. Formerly Stockton Rural District
23. Formerly Teesside County Borough
24. Formerly Tow Law Urban District
25. Formerly Weardale Rural District

== See also ==
- List of civil parishes in England
