= Sadberge (wapentake) =

Former liberty and ancient county of England

Sadberge was a wapentake in northern England until the 16th century. Named after the village of Sadberge, the wapentake covered land now in County Durham, north of the River Tees as far west as Barnard Castle and as far east as Hartlepool.

== History ==
Wapentakes were found in the Danelaw, most notably the wapentakes of Yorkshire. In the 12th century, the wapentake (or "Earldom") of Sadberge was a liberty of the county of Northumberland. In 1139, Northumberland and its liberties were given to the kingdom of Scotland by England's King Stephen. It was reclaimed in 1157 by Henry II. In 1189 Hugh de Puiset, the Bishop of Durham, purchased the manor and wapentake of Sadberge from Richard I for £11,000. The wapentake was initially administered separately from the Bishop's County Palatine of Durham, and sometimes called the "county of Sadberge", with its own sheriff, coroner and court of pleas. Sadberge's institutions gradually merged with those of Durham, ending with its assizes, last held in 1576. By the 14th century its area was included within two of Durham's four "wards" (subdivisions akin to the hundreds of other English counties). Prior to the Durham (County Palatine) Act 1836, the county was officially called "Durham and Sadberge"; a name retained for the Court of Chancery of the County Palatine of Durham and Sadberge until its abolition by the Courts Act 1971.

== Area ==
Sadberge comprised several discontiguous portions:

- An area which became the northeast part of Stockton ward, comprising the parishes of Hart, Hartlepool, Stranton, Elwick Hall and Greatham (excluding Claxton)
- An area which became the southwest part of Stockton ward, comprising the parishes of Stainton, Elton, Long Newton, Egglescliffe, Middleton St George, Low Dinsdale and Hurworth, and the townships of Coatham Mundeville and Sadberge
- An area merged into Darlington ward, comprising the parishes of Coniscliffe and Gainford

== See also ==
- House of Balliol
