= Stranton =

Area of Hartlepool, England

Coordinates: 54.666°N 1.224°W

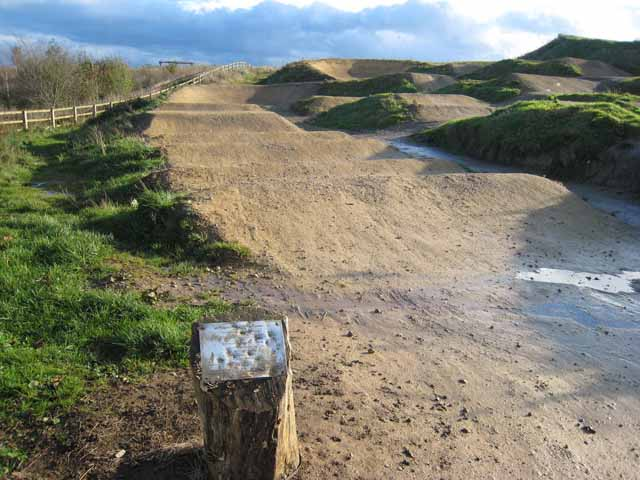
- BMX track, Summerhill Country Park, in the former parish

- Location within County Durham
- Unitary authority: Hartlepool
- Ceremonial county: Durham
- Region: North East
- Country: England
- Sovereign state: United Kingdom
- Police: Cleveland
- Fire: Cleveland
- Ambulance: North East

Stranton is an area of south Hartlepool in the borough of Hartlepool, County Durham, England. It is a former village and parish.

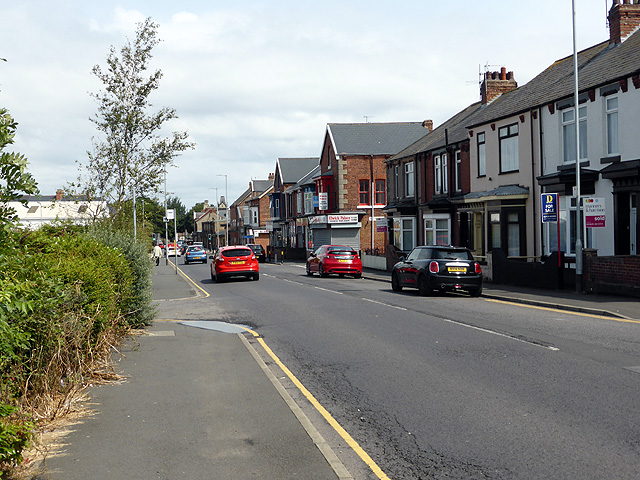
Elwick Road

The ancient parish boundaries were the North Sea to the east, Greatham Creek, an arm of the Tees, to the south, the parish of Greatham to the south-west, and the Greatham Beck to the west. In 1831, the parish contained the townships of Stranton, Seaton Carew, and Brierton.

The area’s name was last used as an electoral ward name in the 2011 UK Census, with a population of 6,105. It covered most of the town centre with parts of Stranton in the south west of the ward. For the 2015 general election Burn Valley, Headland & Harbour and Victoria replaced the majority of the former ward area.

== History ==
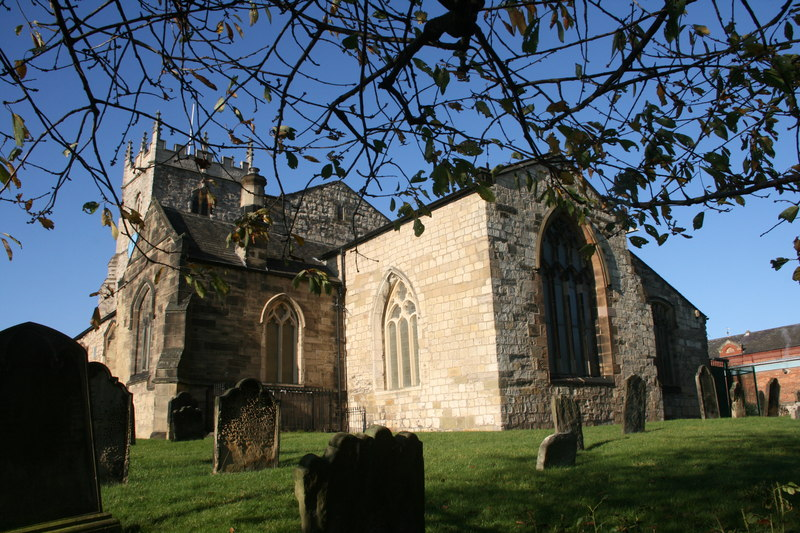
All Saints Church

Samuel A. Lewis's A Topographical Dictionary of England (1848) says:

STRANTON (All Saints), a parish, in the union of Stockton, N. division of Stockton ward, S. division of the county of Durham; containing, with the townships of Brierton and Seaton-Carew, 2106 inhabitants, of whom 1491 are in Stranton township, 2½ miles (S. W. by W.) from Hartlepool, on the road to Stockton. Since the formation of the harbour at Hartlepool, this place has become the scene of busy employment in iron foundries, ship-building yards, and other works connected with maritime trade. A harbour and docks were opened at Stranton in the summer of 1847. Limestone abounds, and used formerly to be quarried to a great extent, and the lime shipped coastwise. The Stockton and Hartlepool railway approaches close to the sea-coast at New Stranton, and is carried along the verge of the sea by an embankment of puddled clay.

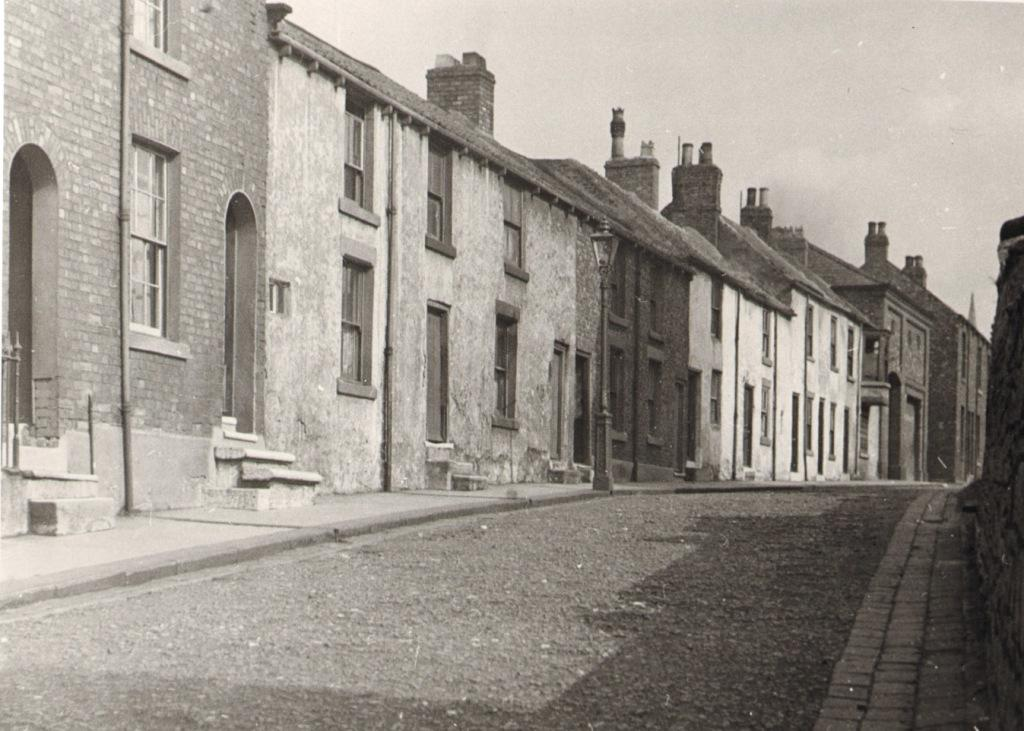
Church Row in 1937

Lewis noted that the parish church was on high ground in the centre of the village and that its tower was a landmark for seamen, and that there was also a Wesleyan Methodist chapel. He reported two benefices, Stranton and Seaton-Carew, and two schools, an almost new National School in the hamlet of Middleton, built in 1840, and a small endowed school in Stranton teaching fifteen children.

In 1931 the civil parish had a population of 308. On 1 April 1937 the parish was abolished and merged with West Hartlepool and Dalton Piercy.

In draining a morass at Stranton, a large quantity of human bones was found, which may have been the remains of the Scots killed at the Siege of Hartlepool in 1644.

== Notable people ==
- Edith Clasper (1894–1984), vaudeville dancer
- Jack London (1913–1963), boxer
- Agnes Rudd (1861–1939), artist
- Lt. General Sir William Marshall (1865–1939), soldier

== See also ==
- Stranton Grange Cemetery
- Sadberge (wapentake)
