= Hart Station =

Area of Hartlepool, County Durham, England

Coordinates: 54.712°N 1.240°W

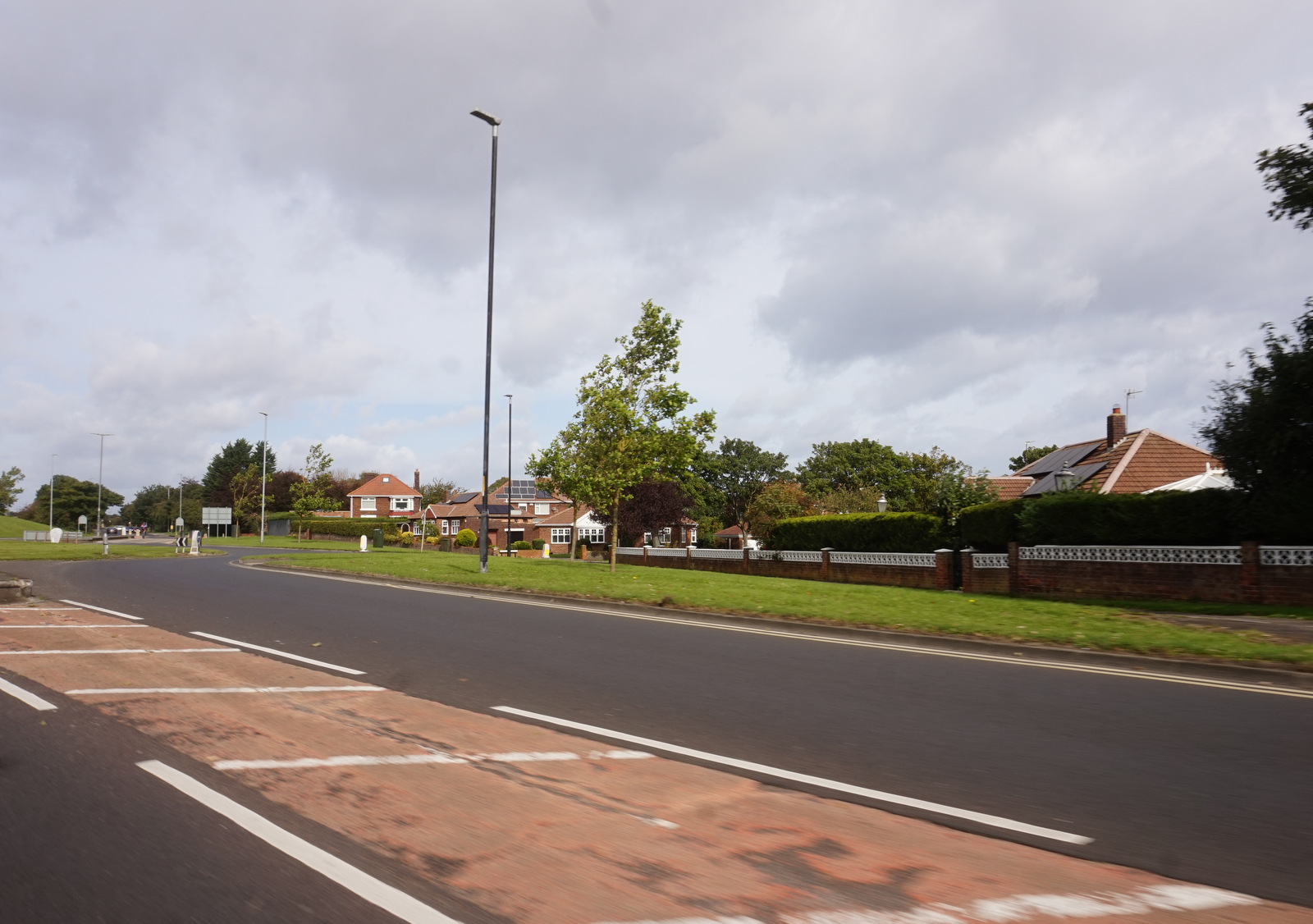
Easington Road

Hart Station is the most northern area of Hartlepool in the borough of Hartlepool, County Durham, England. It is south of Crimdon, east of Hart and north of Throston. It is likely named after the former Hart railway station (1839–1953) around which it first developed.
