= Ferdinand Ashmall =

- Born: 9 January 1695; Elwick, County Durham, England
- Died: 5 February 1798 (aged 103); New House, County Durham
- Occupation: Catholic priest
- Known for: Reaching the age of 103

Ferdinand Ashmall (9 January 1695 – 2 February 1798) was an English centenarian and Catholic priest for the Catholic Church in England and Wales.

== Biography ==
He was born on 9 January 1695 in Elwick, County Durham to Thomas Ashmall and Mary Addison. He was admitted to Lisbon College on 9 August 1711, at age 15, to prepare for the priesthood. He was ordained on 18 February 1720 as a Roman Catholic priest in Portugal. He returned to England in 1723 where he became the chaplain to Mary Salvin at Elvet, County Durham until her death in 1727. He then moved back to his family estate in Amerston. He later moved to New House, County Durham where he remained as the priest until his death.

He died in New House, County Durham on 2 February 1798 in the 104th year of his life. It was the 73rd year of his ministry.
