= Throston =

Area of Hartlepool in County Durham, England

Coordinates: 54.689499°N 1.2341000°W

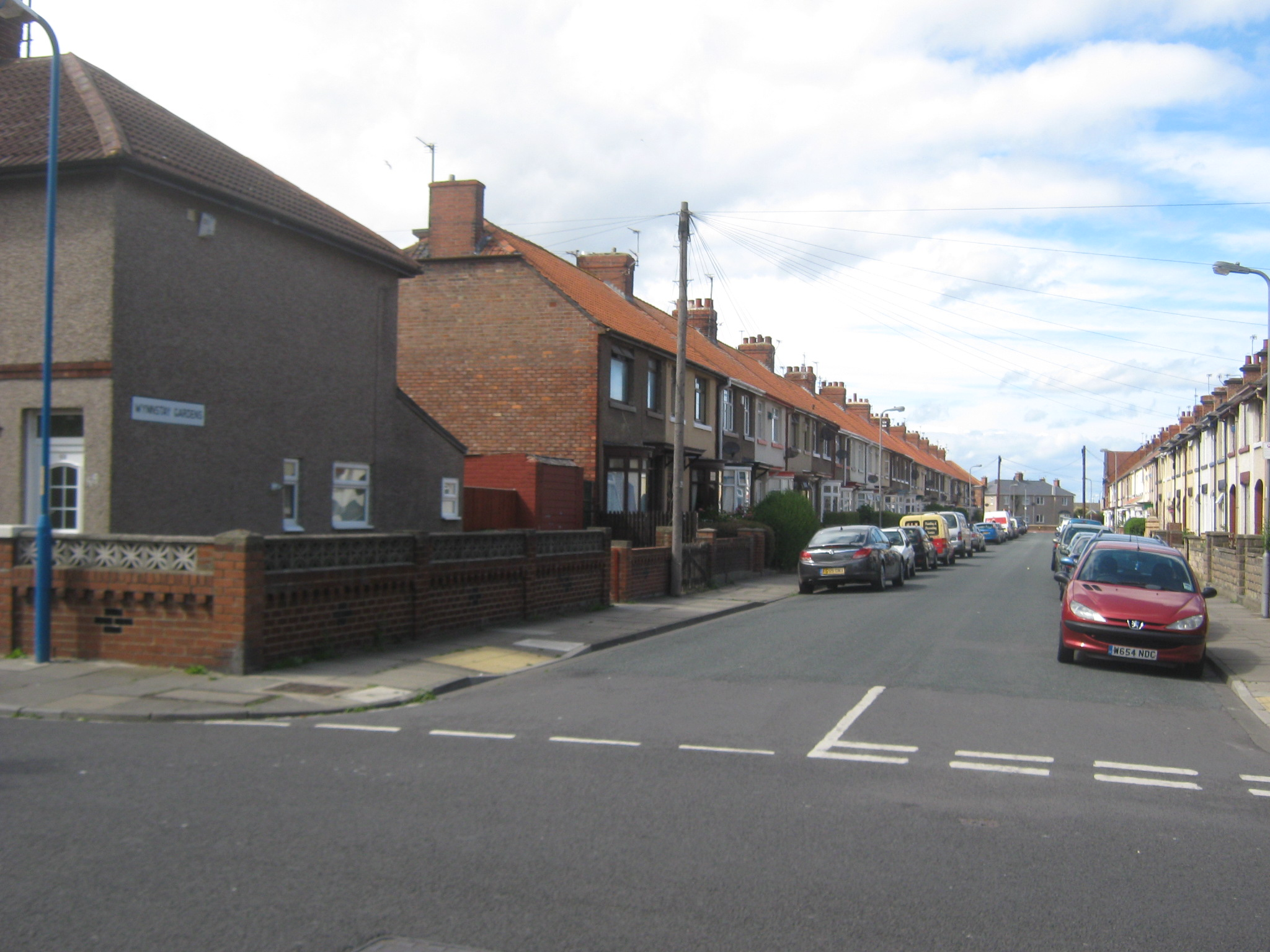
- Wynnstay Gardens

- Location within County Durham
- OS grid reference: NZ4947032986
- Unitary authority: Hartlepool
- Ceremonial county: County Durham
- Region: North East
- Country: England
- Sovereign state: United Kingdom
- Post town: HARTLEPOOL
- Postcode district: TS24 & TS26
- Police: Cleveland
- Fire: Cleveland
- Ambulance: North East
- UK Parliament: Hartlepool

Throston is an area of north Hartlepool within the borough of Hartlepool in County Durham, England. The area name is from the Anglo-Saxon thosson, meaning hill.

== History ==
Throston was formerly a township in the parish of Hartlepool, in 1866 Throston became a separate civil parish. The parish was near the Headland overlooking the Tees bay. The parish also covered inland farm areas such as Dyke House and West View; some included Throston in their names such as High Throston and Throston Grange. The parish was split in 1894 when the part outside the borough of Hartlepool became Throston Rural parish in Hartlepool Rural District. The rural parish existed until 1932 when it became part of West Hartlepool; the urban parish, part of Hartlepool since 1883, was abolished on 1 April 1936. In 1931 the parish had a population of 3729. As Hartlepool developed the area is now mainly urban.

== Education ==
The area has multiple primary schools such as Throston, Brougham, Springwell, Sacred Heart (Roman Catholic), St Bega's (Roman Catholic) and West View. Dyke House Academy and sixth form is also in the area.

== Gallery ==
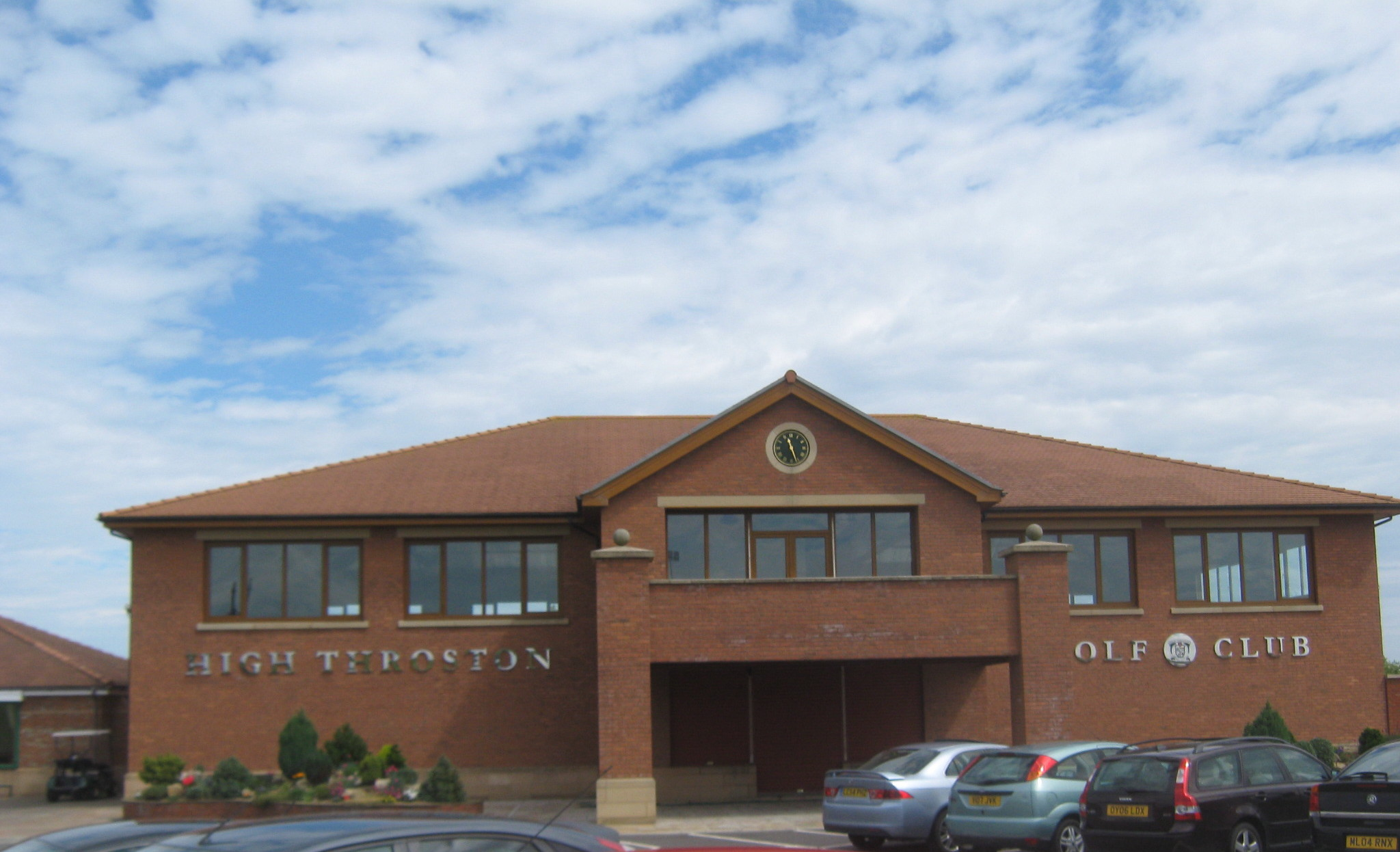
High Throston Golf Club

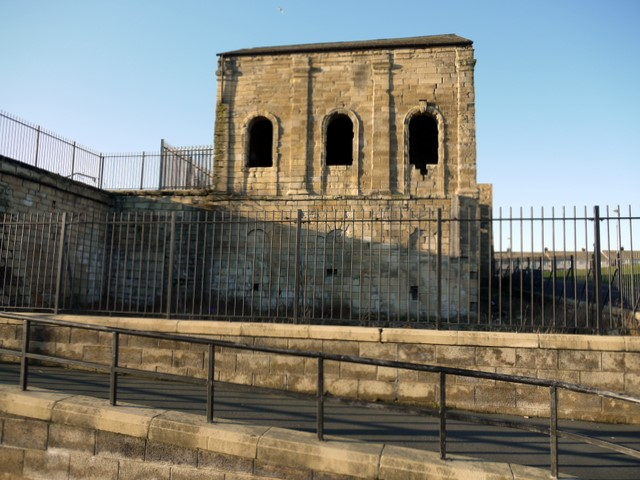
Throston Engine House
