= Ellerker (disambiguation) =

Ellerker is a village and civil parish in the East Riding of Yorkshire, England.

Ellerker may refer also to:

== People ==
- Ellerker Bradshaw (1680–1742), British politician who sat in the House of Commons between 1727 and 1741
- Edward Ellerker (c. 1537–1586), English politician
- Ralph Ellerker (died 1546), English soldier, knight and Member of Parliament
- Thomas Ellerker (1738–1795), English Jesuit
- William Henry Ellerker (died 1891), Australian architect and politician
