= Borough of Hartlepool =

Unitary authority area in County Durham, England

- Unitary authority area and borough
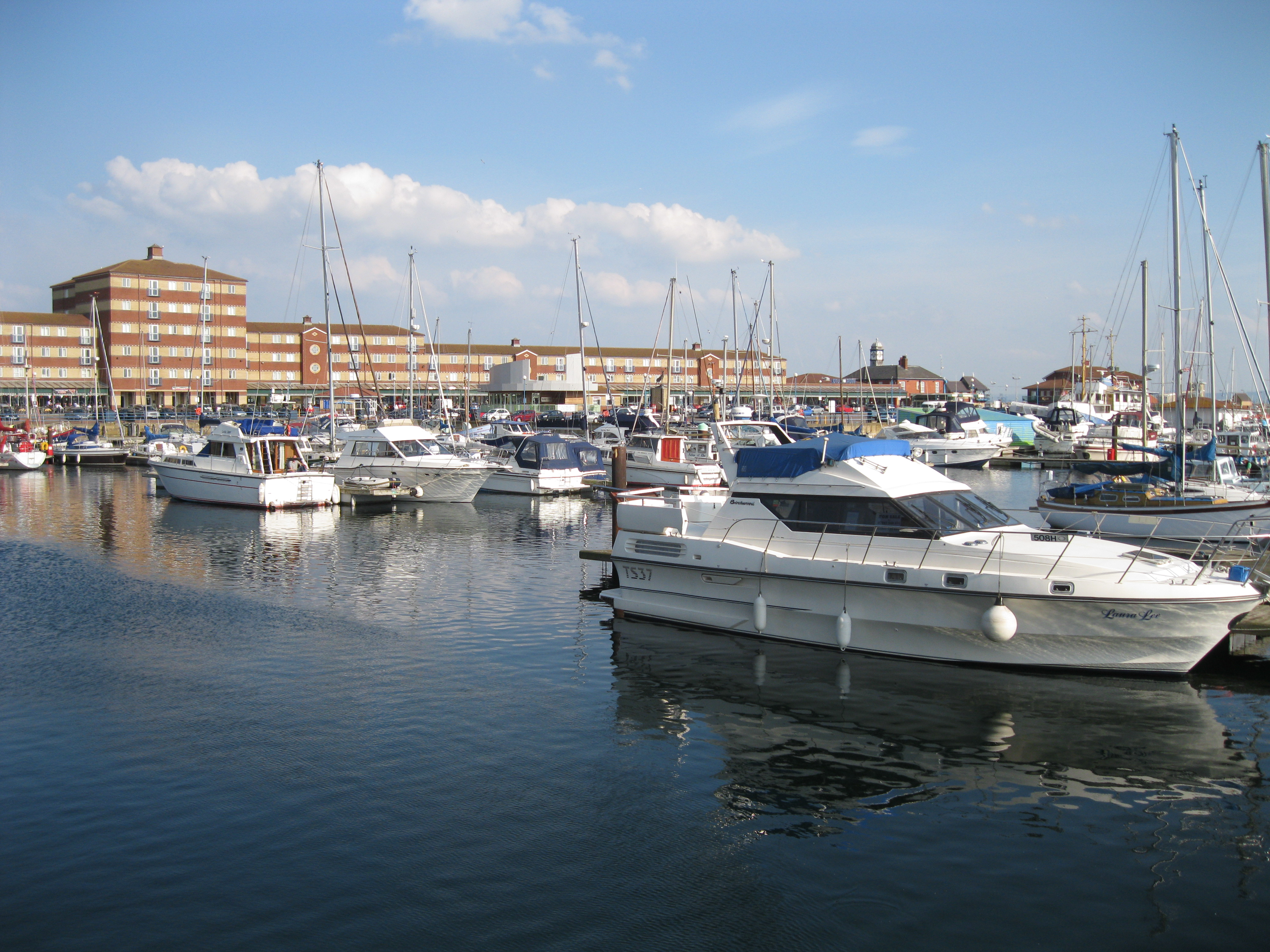
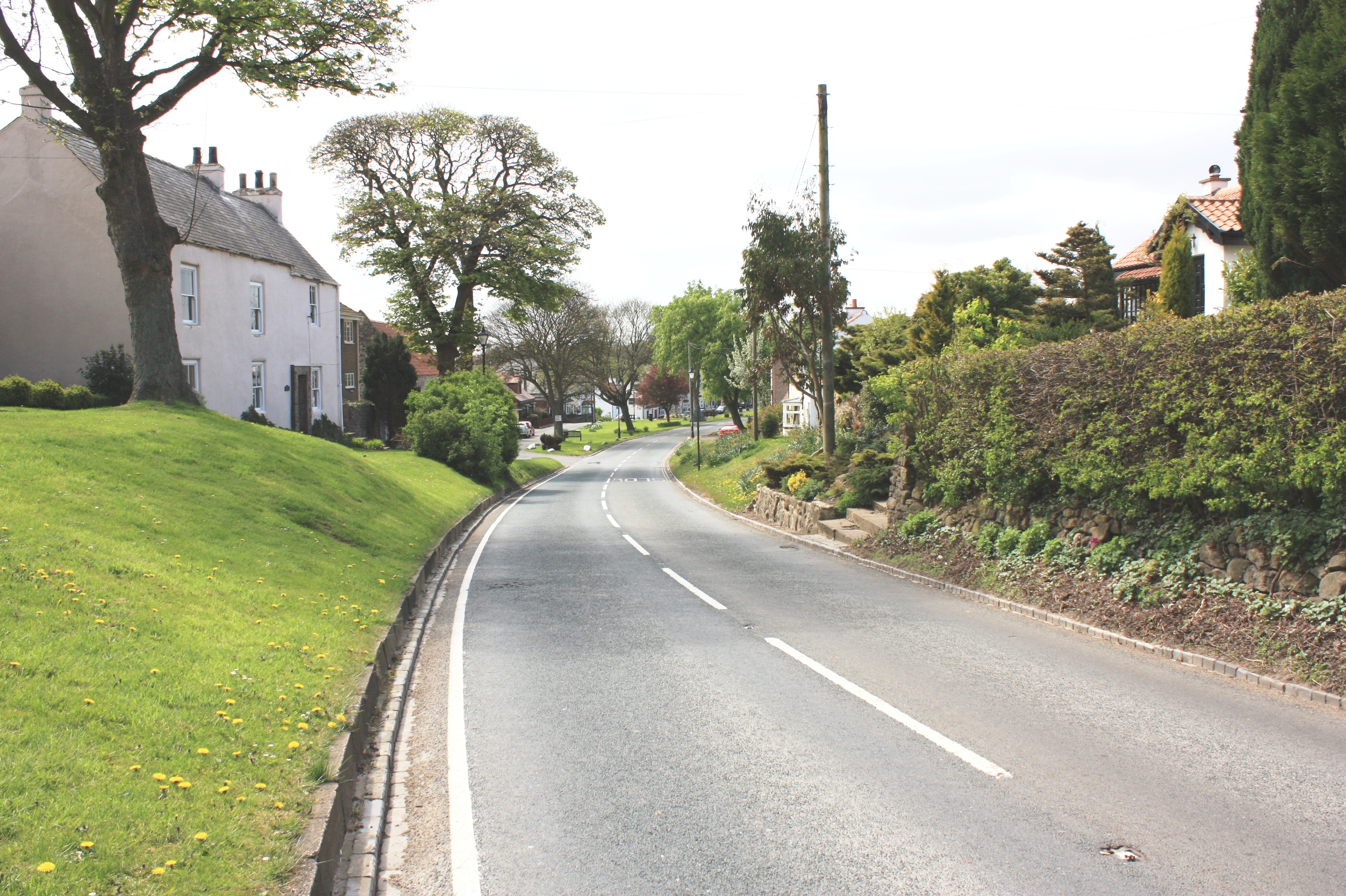
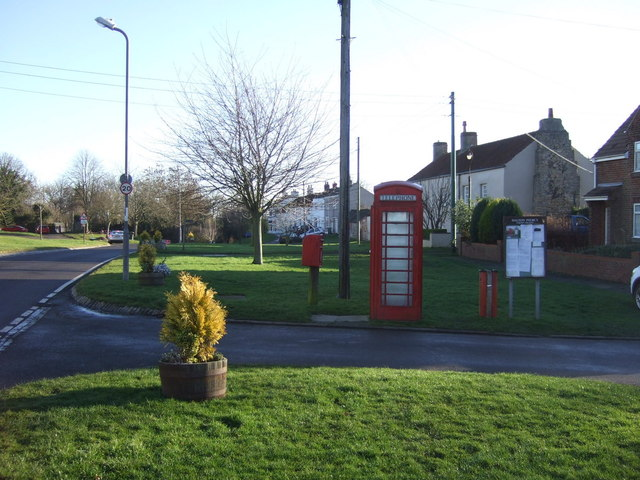
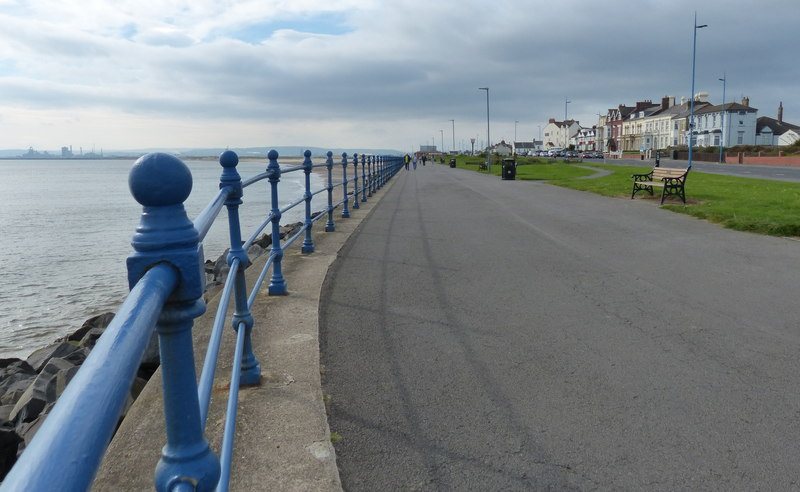
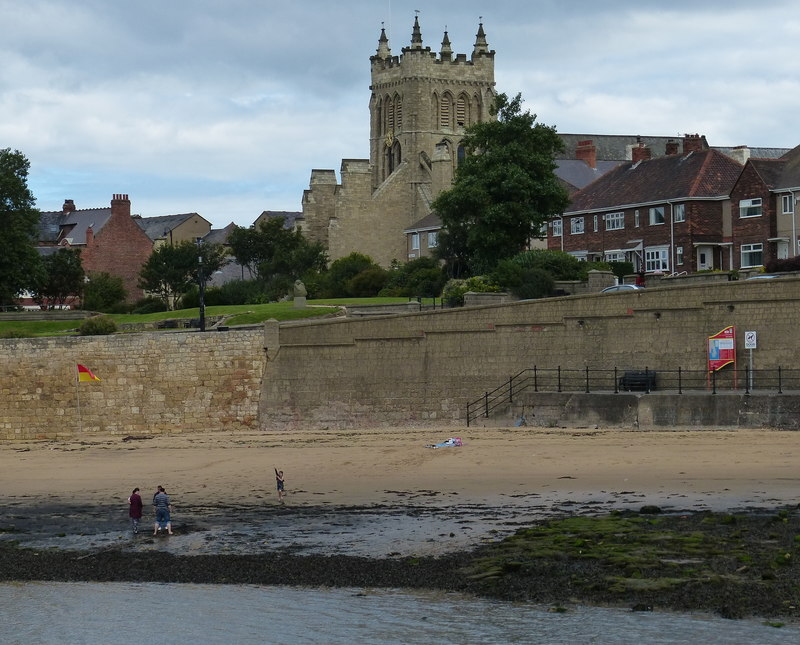
- From left to right; Top: Hartlepool Marina; Middle: Elwick and Dalton Piercy; Bottom: Seaton Carew Esplanade and the Headland with St Hilda's Church

- Hartlepool shown within County Durham
- Coordinates: 54°41′11″N 1°12′39″W
- Sovereign state: United Kingdom
- Country: England
- Region: North East
- Ceremonial county: County Durham
- City region: Tees Valley
- Incorporated: 1 April 1974
- Unitary authority: 1 April 1996
- Named for: Hartlepool
- Administrative HQ: Hartlepool Civic Centre

Government
  - Type: Unitary authority
  - Body: Hartlepool Borough Council
  - Executive: Committee system
  - Control: No overall control
  - MP: Jonathan Brash (L)

Area
  - Total: 36 sq mi (94 km^{2})
  - Rank: 204th

Population (2025)
  - Total: 99,656
  - Rank: 253rd
  - Density: 2,750/sq mi (1,063/km^{2})

Ethnicity (2021)
  - Ethnic groups: List: 96.5% White; 1.7% Asian; 0.7% Mixed; 0.6% other; 0.5% Black

Religion (2021)
  - Religion: List: 52.5% Christianity; 40.1% no religion; 1.3% Islam; 0.2% Hinduism; 0.2% Buddhism; 0.2% Sikhism; 0.0% Judaism; 0.3% other; 5.1% not stated
- Time zone: UTC+0 (GMT)
  - Summer (DST): UTC+1 (BST)
- Postcode areas: TS
- Dialling codes: 01429
- ISO 3166 code: GB-HPL
- GSS code: E06000001
- Website: www.hartlepool.gov.uk

The Borough of Hartlepool is a unitary authority area with borough status in County Durham, England. Hartlepool Borough Council became a unitary authority in 1996; it is independent from Durham County Council. It is named after its largest settlement, Hartlepool, where the council is based. The borough also includes a rural area to the west of the town. The population of the borough at the 2021 census was 92,571, of which over 95% (87,995) lived in the built-up area of Hartlepool itself.

Since 2016 the council has been a member of the Tees Valley Combined Authority, which has been led by the directly elected Tees Valley Mayor since 2017. The Hartlepool constituency has been coterminous with the borough since 1983.

The neighbouring districts are the County Durham district and Stockton-on-Tees; the borough also adjoins Redcar and Cleveland across the mouth of the River Tees.

== History ==
The town of Hartlepool was an ancient borough, having been granted a charter by King John in 1200. It was reformed to become a municipal borough in 1850. This borough covered the relatively small area now known as the Headland, where the original town was located.

The new town of West Hartlepool was laid out from the 1840s on land outside Hartlepool's historic borough boundaries, in the neighbouring parish of Stranton. A body of improvement commissioners was established to administer the new town in 1854. The commissioners' district was enlarged in 1883 to include Seaton Carew. The commissioners were superseded in 1887, when West Hartlepool was incorporated as a separate borough. In 1902 West Hartlepool was elevated to become a county borough, making it independent from Durham County Council.

After several unification efforts starting in 1902, the two boroughs of Hartlepool and West Hartlepool merged into a single county borough called Hartlepool in 1967, also absorbing at the same time the neighbouring parish of Seaton (being the residual rural part of the old parish of Seaton Carew) to provide coastal land for industrial development.

The borough was reformed and enlarged on 1 April 1974, by the merger of the previous county borough of Hartlepool, along with the parishes of Brierton, Claxton, Dalton Piercy, Elwick, Elwick Hall, Greatham, Hart and Newton Bewley, from the Stockton Rural District, all of which had been part of the administrative county of Durham. The enlarged borough was transferred at the same time from County Durham to the new non-metropolitan county of Cleveland.

Cleveland was abolished in 1996 following the Banham Review, which gave unitary authority status to its four districts, including Hartlepool. The way this change was implemented was to create a new non-metropolitan county of Hartlepool covering the same area as the existing borough, but with no separate county council; instead the existing borough council took on county functions, making it a unitary authority. The borough was restored to County Durham for ceremonial purposes at the same time, but as a unitary authority it is independent from Durham County Council. Hartlepool continues to share certain local services with the other former Cleveland boroughs, including the Cleveland Police and Cleveland Fire Brigade.

== Governance ==
Hartlepool Borough Council

Type
- Type: Unitary authority

Leadership
- Mayor: Sue Little, Independent since 21 May 2026
- Leader: Dave Bruce, Reform UK since 15 September 2026
- Chief Executive: Matt Wilton since 2026

Structure
- Seats: 36 councillors
- Graph of the party split among 36 seats.
- Political groups: All parties (36) Reform (16) Labour (14) Independent (6)
- Joint committees: Tees Valley Combined Authority

Elections
- Voting system: First-past-the-post
- Last election: 7 May 2026
- Next election: 6 May 2027

Meeting place
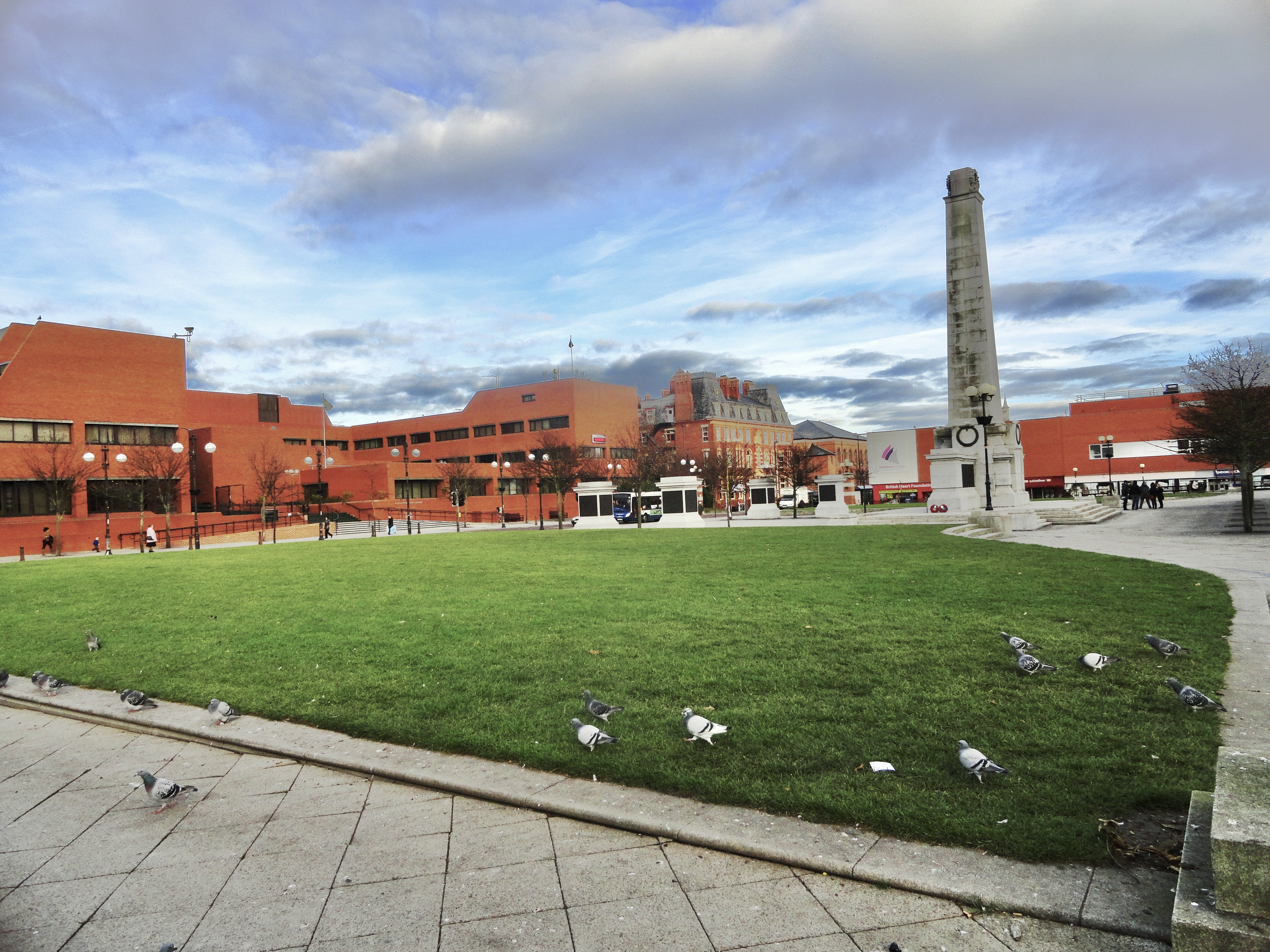
- Civic Centre, Victoria Road, Hartlepool, TS24 8AY

Website
- www.hartlepool.gov.uk

Hartlepool Borough Council provides both county-level and district-level services. There are also nine civil parishes in the borough, which form a second tier of local government for their areas; the rest of the borough is an unparished area.

Since 2016 the council has been a member of the Tees Valley Combined Authority.

In May 2021, the four parish councils of Elwick, Hart, Dalton Piercy and Greatham all issued individual votes of no confidence in Hartlepool Borough Council, and expressed their desire to re-join County Durham. Subsequently, quarterly parish liaison meetings were set up between the parish and borough councils, and a new Parish Charter was adopted.

=== Political control ===
The council went under no overall control at the May 2026 elections. Reform UK is the largest party, and has led the council since then.

Political control of the council since the 1974 reforms has been as follows:

Non-metropolitan district

Party in control	Years
Labour	1974–1976
No overall control	1976–1979
Labour	1979–1996

Unitary authority

Party in control	Years
Labour	1996–2000
No overall control	2000–2004
Labour	2004–2008
No overall control	2008–2010
Labour	2010–2019
No overall control	2019–2024
Labour	2024–2026
No overall control	2026–present

=== Leadership ===
Since 2013 the role of mayor has been largely ceremonial in Hartlepool. Political leadership is instead provided by the leader of the council.

Between 2002 and 2013, Hartlepool was one of a small number of councils in the United Kingdom to have a directly elected mayor. This followed a referendum held in the borough in October 2001. The first mayoral election was held in May 2002, and became famous for being won by the mascot of Hartlepool United F.C., 'H'Angus the Monkey', with a majority of approximately 500 over the second-placed Labour Party candidate. The man inside the monkey costume, Stuart Drummond, served as mayor as an independent, being re-elected in 2005 with a majority of over 10,000 and again in 2009 with a second round majority of 844.

In November 2012 Hartlepool voted in a referendum to abolish the directly elected mayor and return to having a leader of the council, as it had done prior to 2002, being the leadership model used by most English councils. 7,366 voted against the directly elected mayor system, while 5,177 voted to retain it, on a turnout of 18%.

The leaders from 1985 to 2002 were:

Councillor	Party	From	To
Bryan Hanson	Labour		May 1985
Ray Waller	Labour	May 1985	May 1988
Bill Emerson	Labour	May 1988	May 1990
Ray Waller	Labour	May 1990	May 1991
Bryan Hanson	Labour	May 1991	21 May 1998
Ray Waller	Labour	21 May 1998	May 1999
Russell Hart	Labour	May 1999	25 May 2000
Arthur Preece	Liberal Democrats	25 May 2000	5 May 2002

The directly elected mayor was: (Note: Mayoral terms of office run from the fourth day after polling day.)

Mayor	Party	From	To
Stuart Drummond	Independent	6 May 2002	5 May 2013

The leaders since 2013 have been:

Councillor	Party	From	To
Christopher Akers-Belcher	Labour	2 May 2013	21 May 2019
Shane Moore	Independent Union	21 May 2019	12 Sep 2019
Shane Moore	Brexit Party	12 Sep 2019	31 Jan 2020
Shane Moore	Independent Union	31 Jan 2020	16 May 2023
Mike Young	Conservative	16 May 2023	21 May 2024
Brenda Harrison	Labour	21 May 2024	2 Oct 2025
Pamela Hargreaves	Labour	2 Oct 2025	May 2026
Graham Harrison	Reform	21 May 2026	Sep 2026
Dave Bruce	Reform	15 Sep 2026	

=== Composition ===
Following the 2026 election, the composition of the council was:

Party	Seats
Reform	15
Labour	14
Independent	7
Total	36

The next election is due in May 2027.

=== Elections ===
Since the last boundary changes in 2020 the council has comprised 36 councillors representing 12 wards, with each ward electing three councillors. Elections are held three years out of every four, with a third of the council (one councillor for each ward) elected each time for a four-year term of office.

=== Premises ===
The council is based at the Civic Centre on Victoria Road. It was completed in 1976, and was formally opened by Elizabeth II on 14 July 1977. Prior to moving to the Civic Centre, the council was based at the Municipal Buildings on Church Square, which had been built in 1889 for the old West Hartlepool Borough Council. Before the 1967 merger the old Hartlepool Borough Council had been based at Hartlepool Borough Hall on Middlegate.

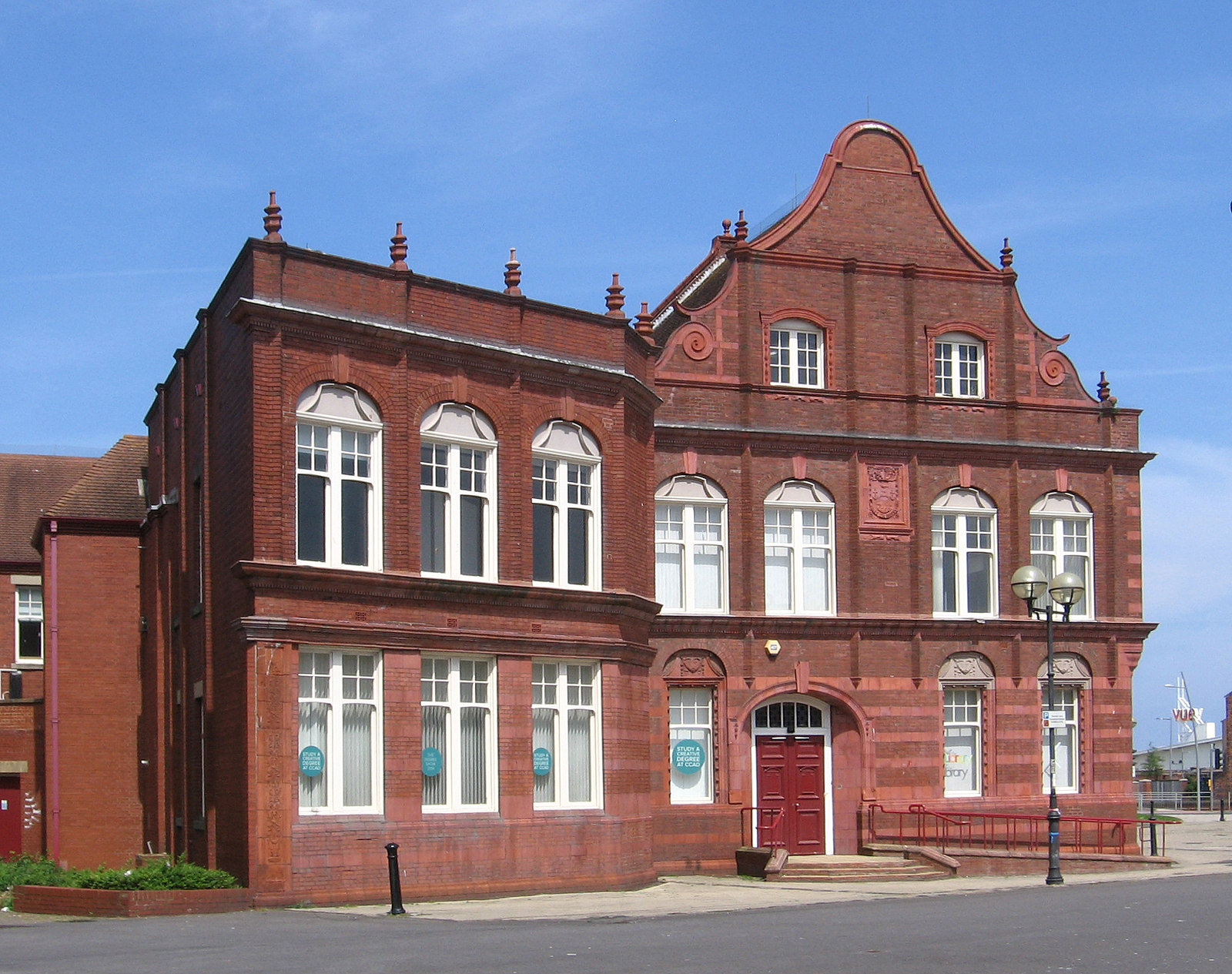
Municipal Buildings, Church Square: Built 1889 for West Hartlepool Borough Council

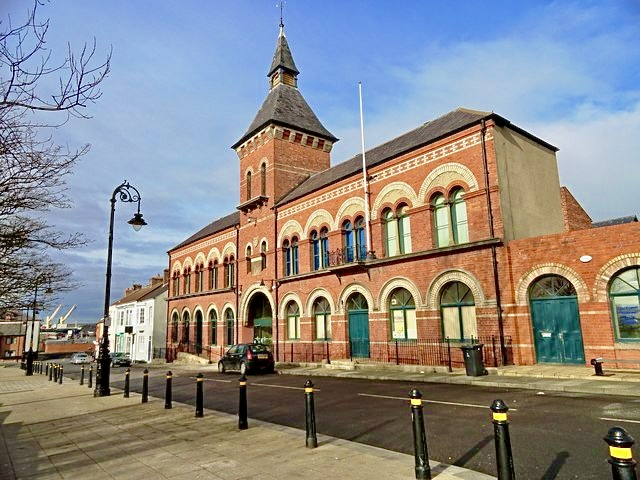
Hartlepool Borough Hall: Built 1866 for the old Hartlepool Borough Council

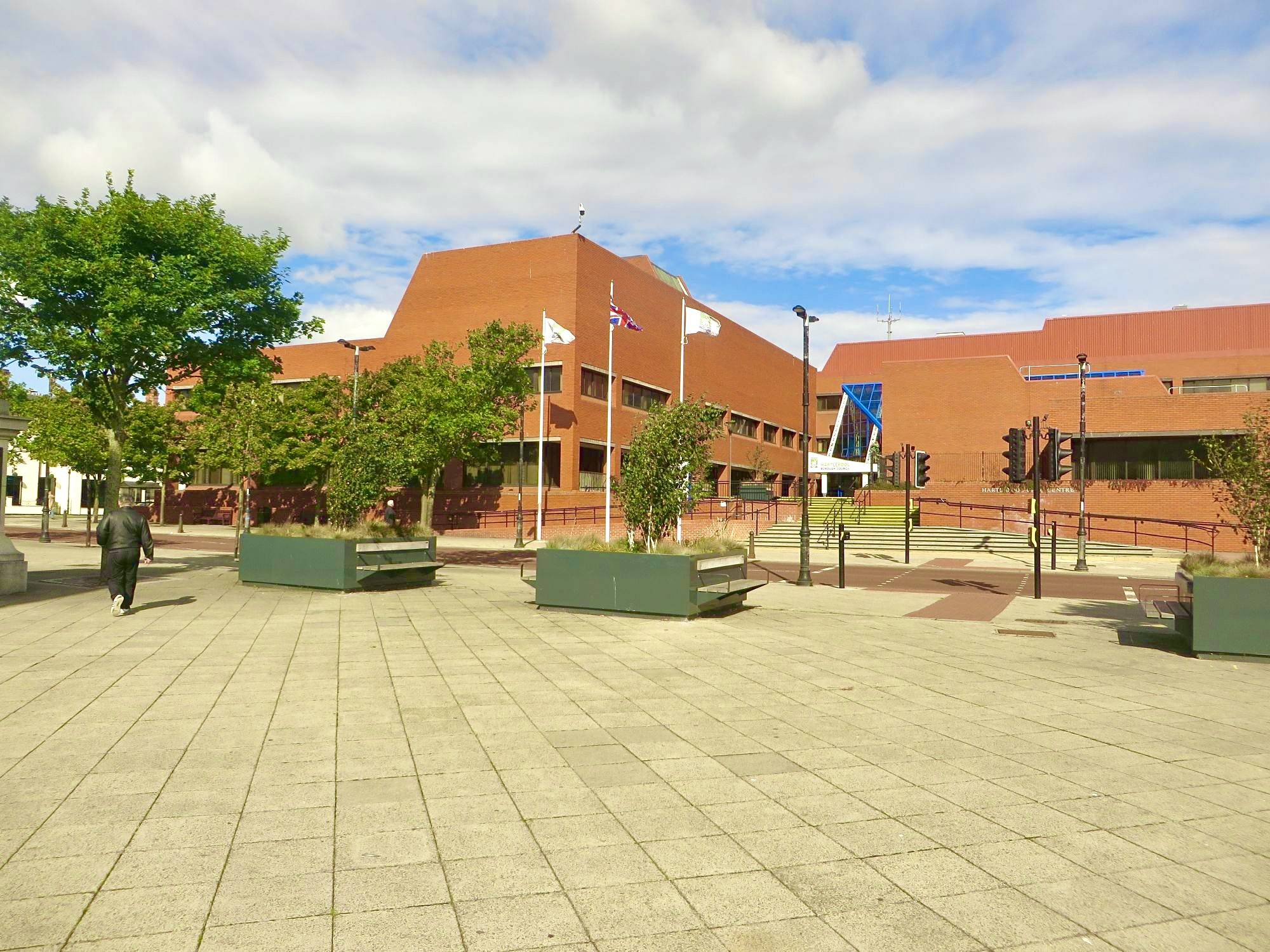
Hartlepool Civic Centre: Completed 1976 following merger of the two boroughs.

== Settlements ==
Settlements in the borough include:

- Brierton
- Claxton
- Dalton Piercy
- Elwick
- Greatham
- Hart
- Hart Station
- Hartlepool
- The Headland
- Middleton
- Newton Bewley
- Owton
- Rift House
- Seaton Carew
- Stranton
- Throston
- West View

== Demography ==
=== Ethnicity ===
Ethnic Group	Year							
Ethnic Group	1991		2001		2011		2021	
Ethnic Group	Number	%	Number	%	Number	%	Number	%
White: Total	89,765	99.3%	87,569	98.8%	89,899	97.7%	89,068	96.4%
White: British	–	–	86,874	98%	88,924	96.6%	87,761	95.0%
White: Irish	–	–	235		193		170	0.2%
White: Gypsy or Irish Traveller	–	–	–	–	40		37	0.0%
White: Roma							19	0.0%
White: Other	–	–	460		742		1,081	1.2%
Asian or Asian British: Total	486	0.5%	602	0.7%	1,304	1.4%	1,600	1.7%
Asian or Asian British: Indian	160		187		266		335	0.4%
Asian or Asian British: Pakistani	106		204		291		297	0.3%
Asian or Asian British: Bangladeshi	73		73		214		278	0.3%
Asian or Asian British: Chinese	94		110		229		217	0.2%
Asian or Asian British: Other Asian	53		28		304		473	0.5%
Black or Black British: Total	78	–	70	–	170	0.2%	445	0.6%
Black or Black British: African	31	–	36	–	36		327	0.4%
Black or Black British: Caribbean	21	–	16	–	129		57	0.1%
Black or Black British: Other Black	26	–	18	–	5		61	0.1%
Mixed or British Mixed: Total	–	–	311	0.4%	550	0.6%	671	0.8%
Mixed: White and Black Caribbean	–	–	85	–	180		143	0.2%
Mixed: White and Black African	–	–	34	–	54		115	0.1%
Mixed: White and Asian	–	–	94	–	173		240	0.3%
Mixed: Other Mixed	–	–	98	–	143		173	0.2%
Other: Total	80	–	59	–	105	0.1%	554	0.6%
Other: Arab	–	–	–	–	57		270	0.3%
Other: Any other ethnic group	80	–	59	–	48		284	0.3%
Total	90,409	100%	88,611	100%	92,028	100%	92,338	100%
