= 2026 Hartlepool Borough Council election =

Local election in Cheshire, England

- 7 May 2026

12 out of 36 seats to Hartlepool Borough Council 19 seats needed for a majority
- Turnout: 31.5% (▲3.5%)
	First party	Second party	Third party
Leader	Graham Harrison	Pamela Hargreaves
Party	Reform	Labour	Independent
Leader's seat	Burn Valley	Manor House (defeated)
Last election	0 seats, 14.3%	24 seats, 46.5%	5 seats, 13.5%
Seats before	4	21	8
Seats won	12	0	0
Seats after	15	14	6
Seat change	▲11	▼7	▼2
Popular vote	12,639	6,438	815
Percentage	49.7%	25.3%	3.2%
Swing	▲35.4%	▼21.2%	▼10.3%
	Fourth party	Fifth party
Leader	Thomas Cassidy
Party	Conservative	IU
Leader's seat	Rural West (defeated)
Last election	6 seats, 24.6%	1 seat, did not stand
Seats before	2	1
Seats won	0	0
Seats after	0	0
Seat change	▼2	▼1
Popular vote	2,513	Did not stand
Percentage	9.9%	Did not stand
Swing	▼14.7%	N/A
- Results by ward
Leader before election
Pamela Hargreaves
Labour
Leader after election
Graham Harrison
Reform
No overall control (Note: Reform minority.)

The 2026 Hartlepool Borough Council election was held on 7 May 2026, alongside the other local elections across the United Kingdom being held on the same day, to elect 12 of 36 members of Hartlepool Borough Council.

Prior to the election, the council was under Labour majority control. At the election, the council went under no overall control. Reform UK won all twelve of the seats being contested at this election. They were left with fifteen seats, one more than Labour's fourteen, and there were also seven independent councillors. The incumbent Labour leader of the council, Pamela Hargreaves, lost her seat. The Reform group leader, Graham Harrison, was formally appointed as the new leader of the council at the susbequent annual council meeting on 21 May 2026.

== Council composition ==
After 2024 election		Before 2026 election	
Party	Seats	Party	Seats
Labour	24	Labour	21
Reform	0	Reform	4
Conservative	6	Conservative	2
IU	1	IU	1
Independent	5	Independent	8

Changes 2024–2026:

- August 2024: Jonathan Brash (Labour) resigns – by-election held September 2024
- September 2024: Owen Riddle (Labour) wins by-election
- March 2025: Cameron Sharp (Labour) resigns – by-election held May 2025
- May 2025:
  - Amanda Napper (Reform) gains by-election from Labour
  - Rob Darby (Conservative) joins Reform
  - Tom Feeney (Labour) leaves party to sit as an independent
- June 2025: Steve Wallace (Independent, elected as Labour) resigns – by-election held July 2025
- July 2025: Ed Doyle (Reform) nominally gains by-election from Labour
- August 2025: Mike Young (Conservative) joins Reform
- Andrew Martin-Wells (Conservative) and Scott Reeve (Conservative) leave party to sit as independents
- May 2026: Quewone Bailey-Fleet (Labour) left party to sit as an independent.

== Summary ==
=== Background ===
In 2024, Labour gained the council from no overall control. They held the council previously until 2019.

=== Election result ===
2026 Hartlepool Borough Council election
Party	This election				Full council			This election		
Party	Candidates	Seats	Net	Seats %	Other	Total	Total %	Votes	Votes %	+/−
Reform	12	12	▲11	100.0	3	15	41.7	12,639	49.7	+35.4
Labour	12	0	▼7	0.0	14	14	41.7	6,438	25.3	–21.2
Independent	4	0	▼1	0.0	7	7	16.7	815	3.2	–10.3
Conservative	11	0	▼2	0.0	0	0	0.0	2,513	9.9	–14.7
Green	12	0	Steady	0.0	0	0	0.0	2,386	9.4	+8.6
Liberal Democrats	6	0	Steady	0.0	0	0	0.0	642	2.5	N/A
IU	0	0	▼1	0.0	0	0	0.0	N/A (Note: Did not stand candidates.)	N/A	N/A

== Incumbents ==
Ward	Incumbent councillor	Party	Re-standing
Burn Valley	Owen Riddle	Labour	Yes
De Bruce	Rachel Creevy	Labour	Yes
Fens & Greatham	Bob Buchan	Conservative	Yes
Foggy Furze	Melanie Morley	Labour	Yes
Hart	John Leedham	Conservative	No
Headland & Harbour	Shane Moore	IU	No
Manor House	Pamela Hargreaves	Labour	Yes
Rossmere	Moss Boddy	Labour	Yes
Rural West	Andrew Martin-Wells	Independent	No
Seaton	Gordon Cranney	Independent	Yes
Throston	Amanda Napper	Reform	Yes
Victoria	Gary Allen	Labour	Yes

== Ward results ==
=== Burn Valley ===
Burn Valley
Party	Candidate	Votes	%	±%
Reform	Graham Harrison	847	41.1	+25.1
Labour Co-op	Owen Riddle*	740	35.9	−18.6
Green	India Robertson	252	12.2	N/A
Conservative	Bryan Thompson	165	8.0	−12.1
Liberal Democrats	Lucas Hennells-Barber	57	2.8	N/A
Majority		107	5.2	N/A
Turnout		2,061		
Reform gain from Labour Co-op		Swing	▲21.9	

=== De Bruce ===
De Bruce
Party	Candidate	Votes	%	±%
Reform	Nick Anderson	1,080	60.0	+38.7
Labour Co-op	Rachel Creevy*	459	25.5	−29.3
Green	Jasmine Khan	146	8.1	N/A
Conservative	Lydia Waller	114	6.3	−17.6
Majority		621	34.5	N/A
Turnout		1,799		
Reform gain from Labour Co-op		Swing	▲34.0	

=== Fens & Greatham ===
Fens & Greatham
Party	Candidate	Votes	%	±%
Reform	Dave Bruce	1,226	46.6	+34.0
Labour Co-op	Mark Hanson	857	32.6	+2.7
Conservative	Bob Buchan*	373	14.2	−0.7
Green	Lisa Arnell	173	6.6	N/A
Majority		369	14.0	N/A
Turnout		2,629		
Reform gain from Conservative		Swing	▲15.7	

=== Foggy Furze ===
Foggy Furze
Party	Candidate	Votes	%	±%
Reform	Rob Stevenson	1,001	47.4	+39.8
Labour Co-op	Melanie Morley*	470	22.3	−35.7
Liberal Democrats	Connor Stallard	324	15.3	N/A
Green	Mike Cherrington	163	7.7	N/A
Conservative	Christopher Groves	154	7.3	−24.2
Majority		531	25.1	N/A
Turnout		2,112		
Reform gain from Labour Co-op		Swing	▲37.8	

=== Hart ===
Hart
Party	Candidate	Votes	%	±%
Reform	Brian Cowie	1,128	45.3	+32.9
Labour	Jake Swinburne	535	21.5	−21.1
Independent	Rob Cook	205	8.2	N/A
Green	Michael Brookes	189	7.6	N/A
Conservative	David Nicholson	186	7.5	−24.4
Independent	Jo Banks	132	5.3	N/A
Independent	Stuart Campbell	68	2.7	−5.6
Liberal Democrats	Barry McKinstray	46	1.8	N/A
Majority		593	23.8	N/A
Turnout		2,489		
Reform gain from Conservative		Swing	▲27.0	

=== Headland & Harbour ===
Headland & Harbour
Party	Candidate	Votes	%	±%
Reform	Scott Gaiety	1,150	53.0	+39.5
Labour	Amanda Davis	549	25.3	−26.1
Green	Jessica Ingham	223	10.3	N/A
Conservative	John Mawhinney	175	8.1	−12.1
Liberal Democrats	Nathan McLauchlan	73	3.4	N/A
Majority		601	27.7	N/A
Turnout		2,170		
Reform gain from IU		Swing	▲32.8	

=== Manor House ===
Manor House
Party	Candidate	Votes	%	±%
Reform	Ronnie Buglass	1,041	66.3	+46.6
Labour	Pamela Hargreaves*	354	22.6	−34.8
Green	Tom Casey	174	11.1	N/A
Majority		687	43.7	N/A
Turnout		1,569		
Reform gain from Labour		Swing	▲40.7	

=== Rossmere ===
Rossmere
Party	Candidate	Votes	%	±%
Reform	Christine Wiley	1,017	64.4	+41.9
Labour	Moss Boddy*	307	19.5	−34.9
Green	Matthew Hartley	144	9.1	N/A
Conservative	Veronica Nicholson	110	7.0	−16.1
Majority		710	44.9	N/A
Turnout		1,578		
Reform gain from Labour		Swing	▲38.4	

=== Rural West ===
Rural West
Party	Candidate	Votes	%	±%
Reform	Richie Hughes	1,309	43.2	+29.6
Conservative	Thomas Cassidy	840	27.7	−20.4
Labour Co-op	Sara Hamouda	578	19.1	−14.4
Green	Simon Crute	304	10.0	+5.1
Majority		469	15.5	N/A
Turnout		3,031		
Reform gain from Independent		Swing	▲25.0	

=== Seaton ===
Seaton
Party	Candidate	Votes	%	±%
Reform	Peter Storey	1,062	45.4	+37.9
Labour	Nicholas Cain	486	20.8	+1.2
Independent	Gordon Cranney*	410	17.5	−41.4
Green	Mia Brown	167	7.1	+5.1
Conservative	John Harrison	148	6.3	−5.8
Liberal Democrats	Michael Noppen	65	2.8	N/A
Majority		576	24.6	N/A
Turnout		2,338		
Reform gain from Independent		Swing	▲18.4	

=== Throston ===
Throston (3 seats)
Party	Candidate	Votes	%	±%
Reform	Amanda Napper*	1,012	53.4	+37.2
Labour Co-op	Jack Callaghan	550	29.0	−33.5
Green	Ewan Train	132	7.0	N/A
Conservative	Margaret Lyall	125	6.6	−14.8
Liberal Democrats	Samuel Carr	77	4.1	N/A
Majority		462	24.4	N/A
Turnout		1,896		
Reform hold		Swing	▲35.4	

=== Victoria ===
Victoria (3 seats)
Party	Candidate	Votes	%	±%
Reform	Adam Gaines	766	43.5	+27.9
Labour Co-op	Gary Allen*	553	31.4	−33.3
Green	Connor Dorrian	319	18.1	N/A
Conservative	Rodney Pangbourne	123	7.0	−12.7
Majority		213	12.1	N/A
Turnout		1,761		
Reform gain from Labour Co-op		Swing	▲30.6	
