= Hartlepool Borough Hall =

Municipal building in Hartlepool, County Durham, England

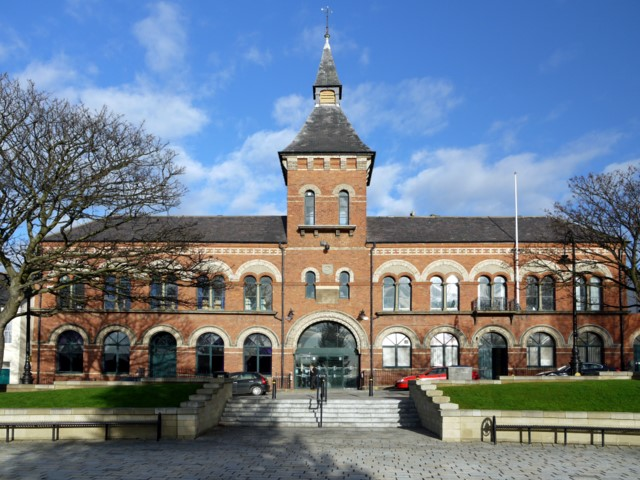
- The build from Croft Gardens

- Shown in County Durham
- 54.6962°N 1.1835°W
- Location: Middlegate, Headland, Hartlepool

History
- Built: 1866

Site notes
- Area: Borough of Hartlepool
- Architect: Charles J. Adams
- Architectural style: Italianate style

Listed Building – Grade II
- Official name: Borough Buildings and Borough Hall, Middlegate
- Designated: 17 December 1985
- Reference no.: 1263357

Hartlepool Borough Hall is municipal building, which served as the meeting place of the old Hartlepool Borough Council, before it amalgamated with West Hartlepool County Borough Council. It is located on the Headland, Hartlepool in County Durham, England and is a Grade II listed building.

== History ==
Hartlepool was an ancient borough, having been given a charter by King John in 1200. It was reformed to become a municipal borough in 1850.

A few years later the council decided to commission a new market hall which could also serve as their headquarters: the site they chose was a street known as Johnny's Close.

The foundation stone for the new building was laid on 10 August 1865. It was designed by Charles J. Adams in the Italianate style, built in red brick with stone dressings at a cost of £5,000 and was officially opened by the mayor, James Groves, on 4 October 1866. The design involved a symmetrical main frontage with eleven bays facing onto Middlegate; the central bay featured a three-stage tower with a wide arched opening on the ground floor, two short lancet windows and a medallion containing the borough coat of arms on the first floor and two tall lancet windows on the second floor. The tower was surmounted by a pyramid-shaped roof, a square lantern and a spire. The wings contained doorways with fanlights in the third bays from each end. The other bays in the wings were fenestrated, on the ground floor, with round headed windows and, on the first floor, with two-light round headed windows with colonettes separating the lights and with ornate carvings in the spandrels. Internally, the building accommodated a market hall, a courtroom, a police station and offices for the borough officials. There also were lock-up cells for petty criminals in the rear block.

In 1926, the market hall was converted into a dance hall and re-decorated in an Art Deco style with a proscenium arch. A dedicated council chamber was also established in the building at that time. The building continued to serve as the headquarters of the old Hartlepool Borough Council until 1967, when the council amalgamated with West Hartlepool Borough Council, with the enlarged council based at the old West Hartlepool headquarters at the Municipal Buildings in Church Square.

The borough hall subsequently became an events venue and notable performers have included the singer Morrissey, who appeared there in May 2009. The BBC television programme, Question Time, was also broadcast from the borough hall in October 2016.
