= St Mary's Church, Hartlepool =

St Mary's Church
- Church of the Immaculate Conception
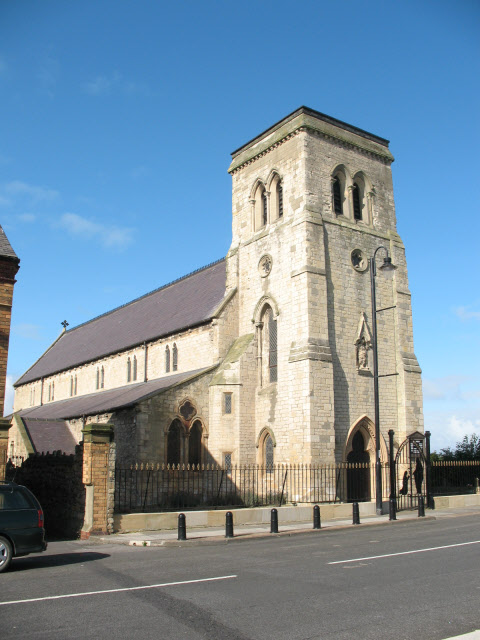
- St Mary's Church
- 54.6963°N 1.1826°W
- OS grid reference: NZ 52781 33775
- Location: Hartlepool
- Country: England
- Denomination: Roman Catholic
- Website: Official website

History
- Status: Parish church
- Founder: Fr William Knight
- Dedication: Immaculate Conception

Architecture
- Functional status: Active
- Heritage designation: Grade II listed
- Designated: 31 March 1949
- Architect: Joseph Hansom
- Style: Gothic Revival
- Groundbreaking: 1850
- Completed: 28 August 1851
- Construction cost: £4,000

Administration
- Province: Liverpool
- Diocese: Hexham and Newcastle
- Deanery: Hilda
- Parish: Holy Family, Hartlepool

St Mary's Church or the Church of the Immaculate Conception is a Roman Catholic Parish church in Headland, Hartlepool, County Durham, England. It was built in 1850 and designed by Joseph Hansom in the Gothic Revival style. It is located on Durham Street, behind Hartlepool Borough Hall. It was the first Catholic church to be built in Hartlepool since the Reformation, and it is a Grade II listed building.

== History ==
=== Foundation ===
In 1834, a Catholic mission was started to serve the local Catholic population of Hartlepool. That year, a chapel was built. A Mr John Wells constructed it on the corner of Prissick Street and Henry Street. The priest at the chapel was Fr William Knight, who had come from Ushaw College. In 1837 a school was also built.

=== Construction ===
Between 1840 and 1850, the population of Hartlepool doubled and a new, larger church needed to be built to accommodate the growing Catholic population. Funds were raised by Fr Knight and a Mr Lawrenson. The funds were collected and building work started in 1850. On 28 August 1851, the church was opened by William Hogarth, the Bishop of Hexham. It replaced St Mary's Chapel and is dedicated to the Immaculate Conception of Mary. It was designed by Joseph Hansom, who also designed Birmingham Town Hall and Arundel Cathedral and John Galley built it and the total cost was £4000. It was largely paid for by subscriptions. In 1884, St Bega's School was built. From St Mary's, other missions were started in Hartlepool from which other churches were built such as St Joseph's Church. In 1946, the spire of the church was demolished, because it was in poor condition.

== Parish ==
With St Joseph's Church, St Patrick's Church, and St John Vianney's Church in Hartlepool, the church is part of the Holy Family Parish.

== See also ==
- St Joseph's Church, Hartlepool
