= Brierton =

Civil Parish in County Durham, England

Coordinates: 54.661381°N 1.2779500°W

- Location within County Durham
- OS grid reference: NZ4667629828
- Unitary authority: Hartlepool
- Ceremonial county: County Durham
- Region: North East
- Country: England
- Sovereign state: United Kingdom
- Post town: HARTLEPOOL
- Postcode district: TS27
- Police: Cleveland
- Fire: Cleveland
- Ambulance: North East
- UK Parliament: Hartlepool

Brierton is a civil parish and hamlet in the borough of Hartlepool, County Durham, England. At the 2011 Census the population of the civil parish was less than 100. Dalton Piercy village hall hold the parish's records.

It is a short distance to Owton in the south-west of Hartlepool. leads to the north of the hamlet with shops and areas between Rift House and Owton are centred on "Brierton Lane" and are sometimes called Brierton, such as the former Brierton fever hospital.
