= Elton, County Durham =

Village and civil parish in County Durham, England

Coordinates: 54.549°N 1.383°W

Elton
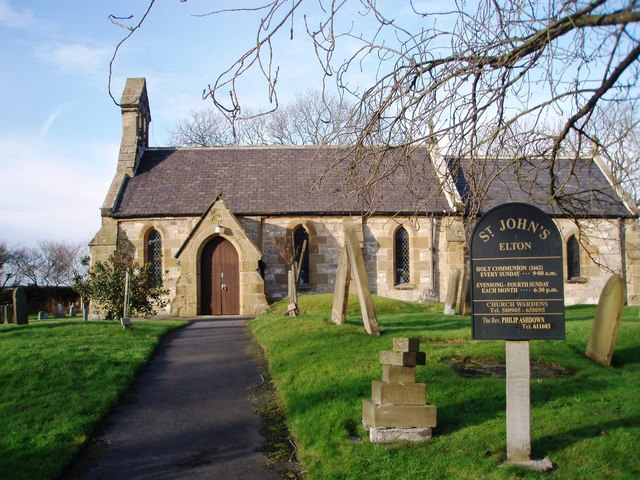
- Church of St John the Baptist

- Location within County Durham
- Population: (2001 Census)
- OS grid reference: NZ 405 173
- Civil parish: Elton
- Unitary authority: Stockton-on-Tees
- Ceremonial county: County Durham
- Region: North East
- Country: England
- Sovereign state: United Kingdom
- Post town: Stockton-on-Tees
- Postcode district: TS21
- Dialling code: 01642
- Police: Cleveland
- Fire: Cleveland
- Ambulance: North East
- UK Parliament: Middlesbrough

Elton is a village and civil parish in the borough of Stockton-on-Tees and ceremonial county of County Durham, England. It is situated a short distance to the west of Stockton-on-Tees.

St. John's Church is located in Elton. It is a Grade II listed building, and was built around 900 years ago.

A public house called The Sutton Arms has been in Elton for 122 years, but closed in 2021 following the retirement of its owners. It is currently under new ownership but there is no news on a potential time for its reopening.

== Population ==
The population of Elton as shown in the 2011 Census was 324.
