= New House, County Durham =

Hamlet in County Durham, England

Coordinates: 54.745°N 2.2199°W

New House
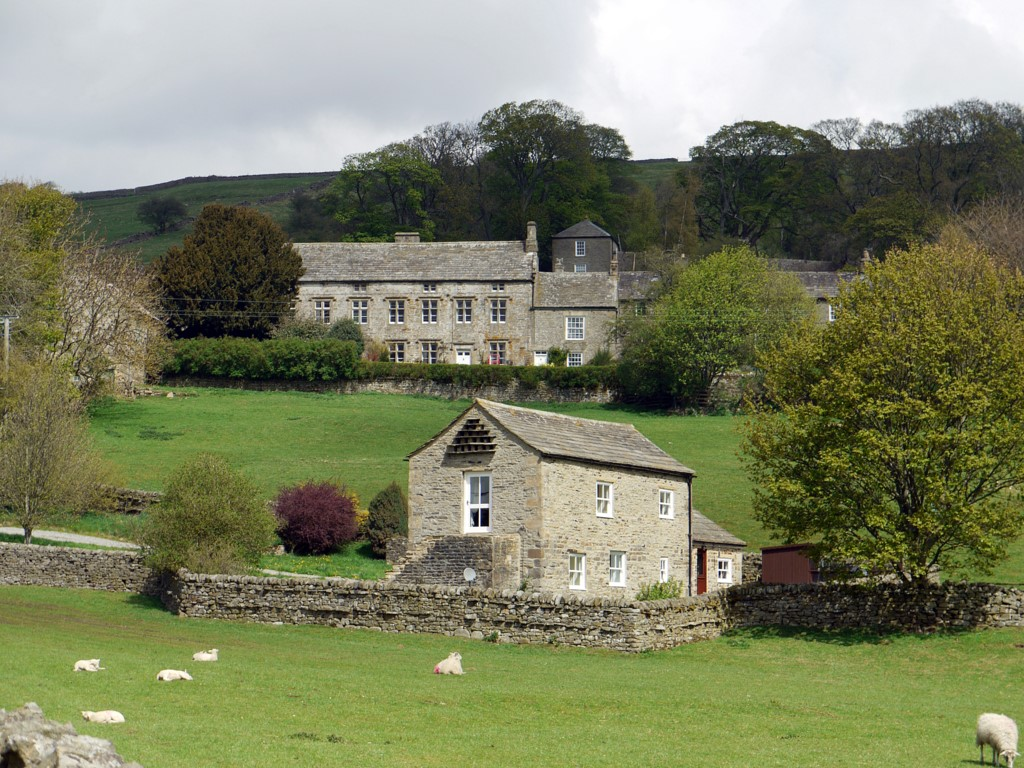
- New House, with former barn in foreground

- Location within County Durham
- Civil parish: Stanhope
- Unitary authority: County Durham
- Ceremonial county: County Durham
- Region: North East
- Country: England
- Sovereign state: United Kingdom
- Post town: BISHOP AUCKLAND
- Postcode district: DL13

New House or Newhouse is a hamlet in the civil parish of Stanhope, in County Durham, England. It lies on the north side of the River Wear, opposite Ireshopeburn, and is linked to the A689 Weardale valley road by Coronation Bridge (built in 1840).

The building known as New House belonged to the Beaumonts, proprietors of the W.B. lead mining company, although it is no longer in the possession of the family following the end of mining in Weardale. This is probably the origin of the name since the other properties in the hamlet are contemporary with the Beaumont house, or built later.

The 7-bay house is from the 17th century, with alterations in the 18th and 19th. It was designated as Grade II* listed in 1967, and is now three dwellings.
