= Elwick, County Durham =

Village in County Durham, England

Coordinates: 54.6843°N 1.2953°W

Elwick
- Village and civil parish
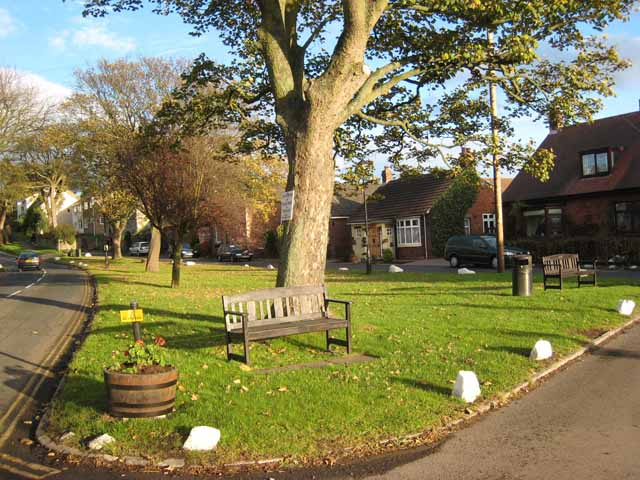
- The village green

- Location within County Durham
- Population: 1,001 (2011)
- OS grid reference: NZ4619932279
- Civil parish: Elwick
- Unitary authority: Hartlepool
- Ceremonial county: County Durham
- Region: North East
- Country: England
- Sovereign state: United Kingdom
- Post town: HARTLEPOOL
- Postcode district: TS27
- Dialling code: 01429
- Police: Cleveland
- Fire: Cleveland
- Ambulance: North East
- UK Parliament: Hartlepool

Elwick is a village and civil parish in the borough of Hartlepool in County Durham, England. It is situated near the A19 road to the west of Hartlepool. Historically, Elwick was a township until 1866 when it became a civil parish.

== History, population and governance ==
Mortality decline in the late 19th century was mainly due to the reduction of a very high infant mortality rates. But during the 20th and 21st centuries a decline in fertility rates and an improved life expectancy has changed the age structure of the population. Elwick has been described by John Marius Wilson in historic writings as, "Elwick, a township in Hart parish, Durham; 4 miles W by S of Hartlepool. It has a post office under Ferryhill. Acres, 1, 500. Real property, £1, 418. Pop., 240. Houses, 55. The township is a meet for the Durham hounds." – from the Imperial Gazetteer of England and Wales in 1870–72.

Historical population
Year	Pop.	±%
1801	129	—
1811	129	+0.0%
1821	176	+36.4%
1831	169	−4.0%
1841	165	−2.4%
1851	187	+13.3%
1881	166	−11.2%
1891	178	+7.2%
1901	258	+44.9%
1911	185	−28.3%
1921	197	+6.5%
1931	204	+3.6%
1951	208	+2.0%
1961	203	−2.4%
		—

The population as taken at the 2015 census was 2061.

Elwick is also an electoral ward of Hartlepool since 1974 and is run by a parish council. In May 2021, the parish council alongside the parish councils of the villages of Hart, Dalton Piercy and Greatham all issued individual votes of no confidence in Hartlepool Borough Council, and expressed their desire to re-join County Durham.

== Church ==
Saint Peter's church is Church of England and the only church in Elwick. It has been described by the Archbishops' Council as "a small, friendly, family-orientated church." . It is a grade two listed building, listed in 1967. Protected by the English Heritage its ID number is: 59861. The church was built in the late 12th century, but has been restored many times. St Peter's has an aisled nave, chancel with north vestry and a south-west tower overlooking the porch. The church has beautiful stained glass windows. The church commissioned a window depicting marriage, which was installed in February 2010 and designed by Alan Davis.

== Facilities ==
Elwick has two public houses – The Spotted Cow and the McOrville Inn. It had a village shop and post office until recently (when?), when it closed.

The village shop has been subsequently been refurbished by a local family and reopened as "Coopers of Elwick", not only offering groceries but now also incorporating a tea room.

There is a WI Hall in the Village which is available for events and hire.

Elwick Village also boasts a popular play park and playing field, the James F. Grieves Memorial Playing Field. Managed by the Parish Council and supported by grants, the village has been able to install a good variety of play equipment.

There is a large village green at the centre of the village that is used for events such as the annual Fete and “Gig on The Green”.

== Education ==
=== Primary school ===
The school in Elwick is St Peters Elwick Primary School.

=== Secondary and further education ===
For higher education people travel out of the parish into Hartlepool. The linked secondary school is High Tunstall College of Science (Ofsted rated Good) there are 4 other secondary schools in Hartlepool - Dyke House Sports and Technology College, The English Martyrs School and Sixth Form College, Manor Community Academy, and St Hilda's Church of England School. Also for further education there is the Hartlepool College of Further Education and Teesside University.

== Transport ==
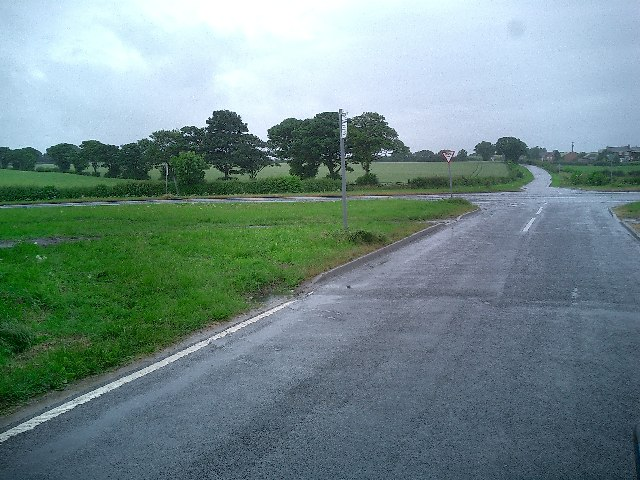
The road through Elwick

A main road runs through the centre of the village called Elwick road, easterly it connects the village to Hartlepool. To the west the road connects to the A19. There is a second exit from North Lane onto the A19

Gaps in the A19 were closed preventing traffic from the village from either accessing from the south, or leaving the village to turn north. This has caused significant additional distance for villagers wanting to leave to the north or enter from the south in the A19.

There are also issues with the increasing amount of traffic using Elwick Road as a rat run to the A19.

Paul's Travel has service 65 bus through the village. Most journeys from Elwick transport people to Hartlepool. The Tees Flex bus service has been running since early 2020. This is an on demand service funded by the Tees Valley Authority.

The nearest airport is Teesside International Airport, which was RAF Middleton St George during World War II. There is no railway station; the nearest to Elwick is either Billingham or Hartlepool.

== Industry ==
Britain in 1801 was divided into two categories of employment – agriculture or trade. Elwick was predominantly agricultural. There are 517 economically active people (aged 16–74) that live in Elwick, 283 of those are in employment and nine are unemployed.

== Geography ==
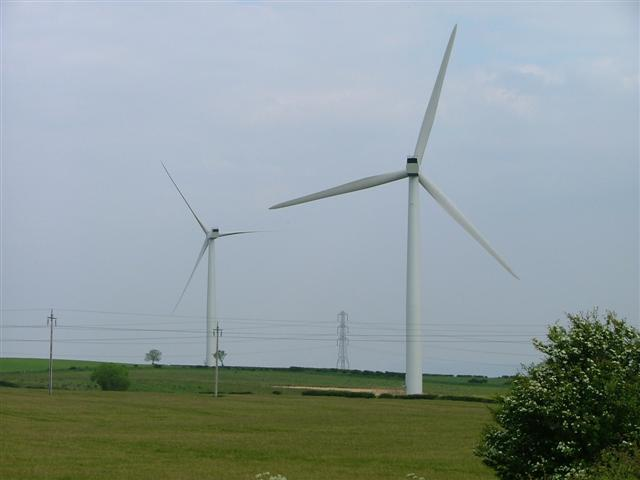
The wind turbines

=== Renewable energy ===
EON, the energy supplier, has put in place three wind turbines on the border of the parish. This development in 2003 split the community, with some accepting the turbines and others opposing them. The three wind turbines provide energy for 6,000 homes.

=== Climate ===
With an 8.5 °C to 9.5 °C average temperature, the climate of Elwick is colder than the UK`s average annual temperature of 7 °C to 11 °C.

=== Urbanisation ===
English Heritage have listed the disused, six-storey-high, brick Elwick windmill. Built in the mid-19th century and grade two listed on 8 January 1980, this windmill has been protected and preserved as a piece of Elwick's history. Apart from the historic buildings of the windmill and church, the majority of the development is residential housing. Elwick has green spaces and old farm buildings. It is not highly built up, or filled with industrial buildings.

=== Geology ===
The landscape is on low-lying land in a valley. The rocks date to the Triassic period (248–205 million years ago). The most common rock type found is red sandstone and mudstone that was deposited under arid sea conditions, with younger Permian period rock overlaid.

== Resources ==
Elwick's main resource is its fertile land, with many farms near by; and a windy climate supporting its wind turbines to produce electricity.

== Notable people ==
- Liam Howe English musician and producer, notable for presence in Sneaker Pimps
- Ferdinand Ashmall (1695–1798), English centenarian and Catholic priest
