= Sadberge =

Village in County Durham, England

Coordinates: 54.54675°N 1.47215°W

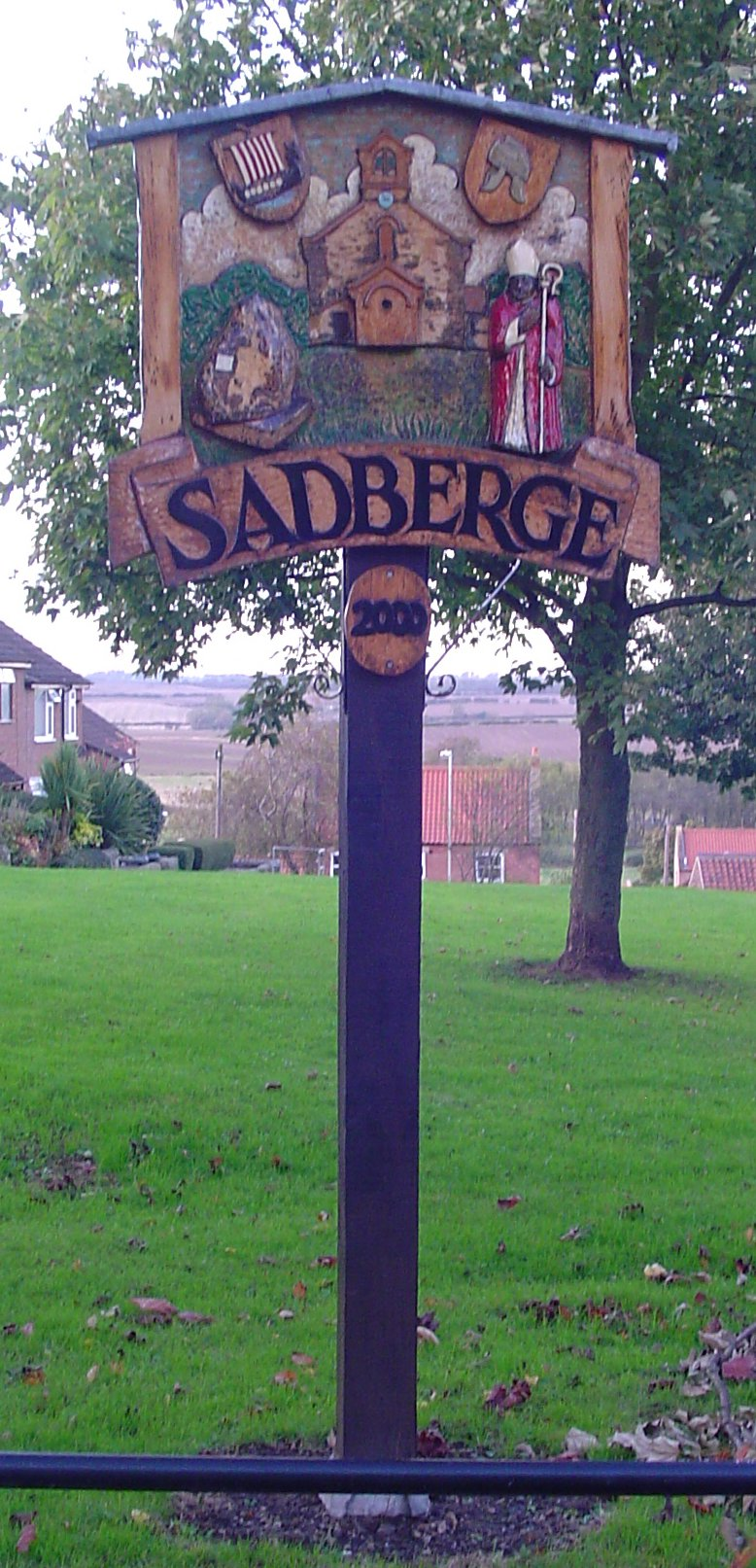
- Signpost in Sadberge

- Location within County Durham
- Population: 691 (2011)
- OS grid reference: NZ342169
- Unitary authority: Darlington
- Ceremonial county: County Durham
- Region: North East
- Country: England
- Sovereign state: United Kingdom
- Post town: Darlington
- Postcode district: DL2
- Police: Durham
- Fire: County Durham and Darlington
- Ambulance: North East
- UK Parliament: Sedgefield

Sadberge (/ˈsædbɜːrdʒ/) is a village in County Durham, England, situated between Darlington and Stockton-on-Tees. It is administered as part of the borough of Darlington.

== History ==
The village's name is Old Danish for "flat hill", an accurate description of the location of the village from where good views of the surrounding countryside can be obtained. The origin of the name is reflective of the area's high Viking-influence. Placenames with the same root also appear in other Viking-influenced areas, including the village of Sedbergh in the West Riding of Yorkshire (now administered as part of Westmorland and Furness).

The wapentake of Sadberge, a manor and liberty named after the village, was a liberty of Northumberland until purchased by the Bishop of Durham in 1189 and gradually incorporated into his County Palatine of Durham. Following the passing of the Durham (County Palatine) Act 1836, which abolished the temporal authority of the Bishop of Durham within the County of Durham and Sadberge, the Bishop's tenure of Sadberge reverted to the Crown. Accordingly, a large stone erected on the village green to mark the Golden Jubilee of Queen Victoria is inscribed with the words 'Victoria: Queen of the United Kingdom, Empress of India and Countess of Sadberge'.

== Facilities ==
Sadberge is conveniently situated for fast commuting to Teesside. The village has a church, village hall and two pubs.
