= Thomas Ellerker =

English Jesuit

Thomas Ellerker (1738–1795), was an English Jesuit.

== Life ==
Ellerker was born at Hart, near Hartlepool, County Durham, on 21 September 1738, entered the Society of Jesus in 1755, and in due course became a professed father. When the order was suppressed in 1773 he accompanied his fellow Jesuits to Liège, and thence emigrated with the community in 1794 to Stonyhurst, Lancashire, where he died on 1 May 1795.

== Writings ==
Ellerker, who is described by Dr. Oliver as "one of the ablest professors of theology that the English province ever produced" was the author of Tractatus Theologicus de Jure et Justitiâ (1767) and Tractatus de Incarnatione.
