= Newton Bewley =

Coordinates: 54.633331°N 1.2833329°W

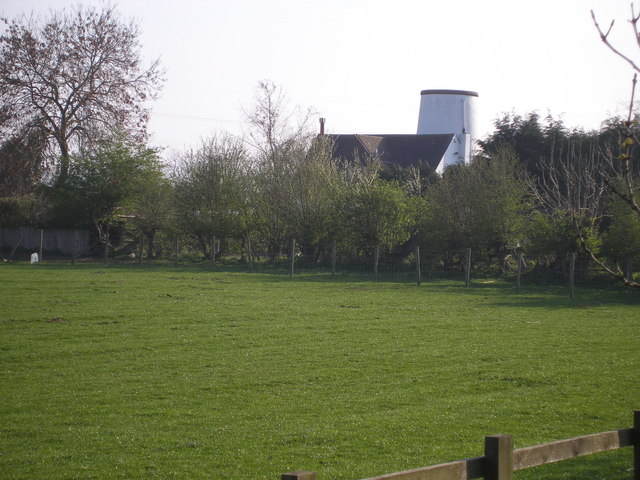
- A converted mill at Newton Bewley

- Location within County Durham
- OS grid reference: NZ4636026703
- Unitary authority: Hartlepool
- Ceremonial county: County Durham
- Region: North East
- Country: England
- Sovereign state: United Kingdom
- Post town: BILLINGHAM
- Postcode district: TS22
- Dialling code: 01740
- Police: Cleveland
- Fire: Cleveland
- Ambulance: North East
- UK Parliament: Hartlepool

Newton Bewley is a village and civil parish in the borough of Hartlepool in County Durham, England. It is situated between the towns of Hartlepool and Billingham. At the 2011 census the population of the civil parish was less than 100. Details can be found in the parish of Greatham.

A settlement called Neuton de Beaulu is mentioned in account books for Durham Priory from 1334. "Bewley", meaning "beautiful place", was the name of a manor in the area; the villages of Newton Bewley and Cowpen Bewley retain this name although the manor itself is gone.
