= Rift House =

Area of Hartlepool, County Durham, England

Coordinates: 54.667°N 1.234°W

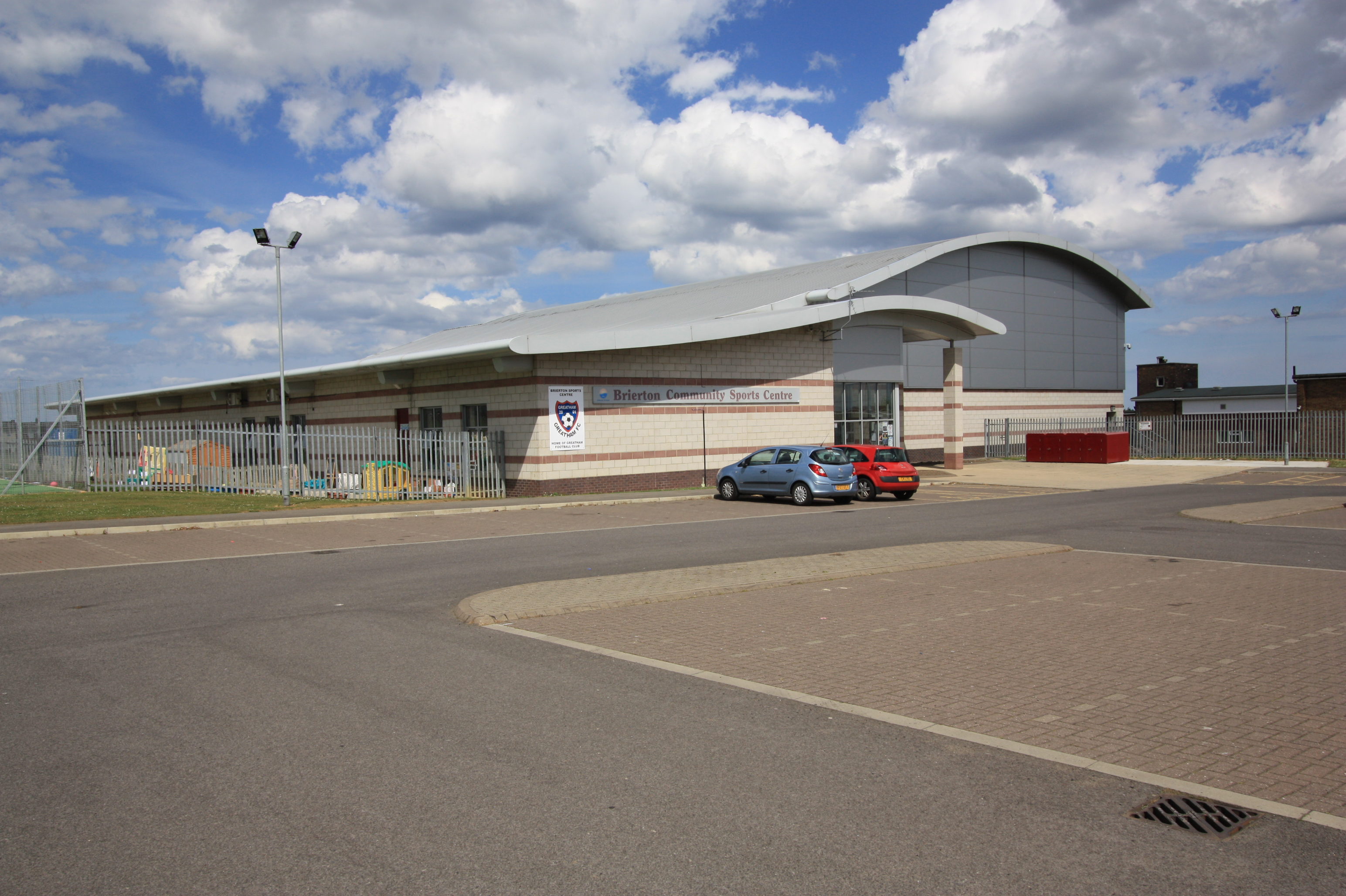
- The community sport centre on Brierton Lane

- Location within County Durham
- Population: 6,285 (2011.Ward)
- OS grid reference: NZ495305
- Unitary authority: Hartlepool
- Ceremonial county: County Durham
- Region: North East
- Country: England
- Sovereign state: United Kingdom
- Post town: HARTLEPOOL
- Postcode district: TS25
- Police: Cleveland
- Fire: Cleveland
- Ambulance: North East

Rift House is an area of south-west Hartlepool in the borough of Hartlepool, County Durham, England. It has a secondary school with a sixth-form college and two primary schools; English Martyrs, Kingsley and Rift House. It was a ward of the town for the 2011 UK Census, for the 2015 UK general election it was split between two wards Manor House (with Owton) and Foggy Furze.
