= St Hilda's Church, Hartlepool =

Anglican church in County Durham, England

Church of St Hilda, Hartlepool
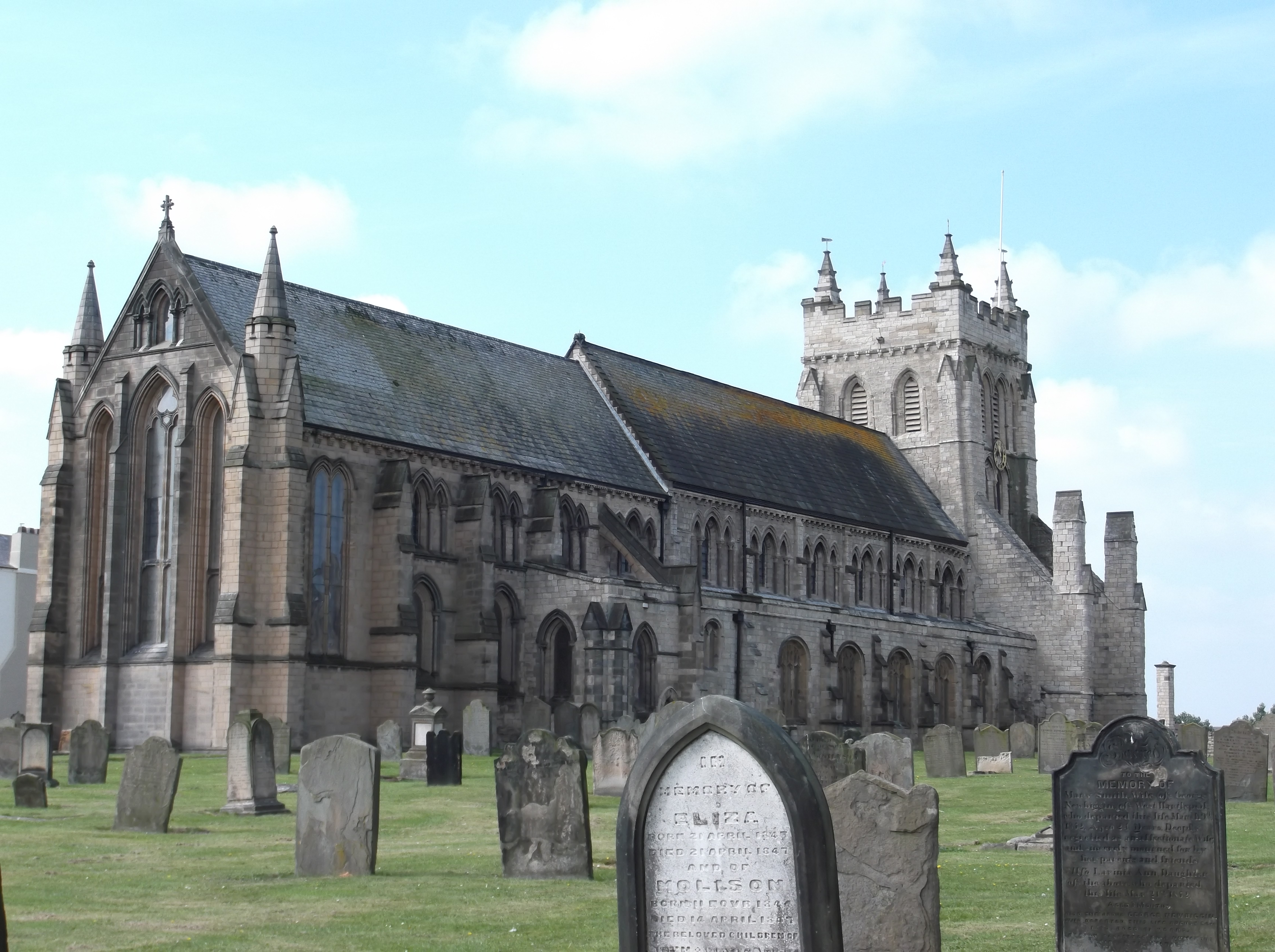
- Photograph of St Hilda's Church, Hartlepool, County Durham
- Church of St Hilda, Hartlepool
- 54.69537°N 1.18177°W
- OS grid reference: NZ 52842 33679
- Country: England
- Denomination: Church of England

Architecture
- Functional status: Active
- Heritage designation: Grade I

St Hilda's Church is the parish church of Hartlepool, County Durham, England. It is recorded in the National Heritage List for England as a designated Grade I listed building. The church is located in Old Hartlepool on the Headland. It is one of the many visible buildings on Hartlepool's skyline.

Clifton-Taylor includes it in his list of "best" English parish churches and describes it as "a glory of Early English architecture in its earliest and purest phase" and as an "architectural gem".

The tower contains three bells hung for change ringing, all cast in 1819 by Thomas II Mears, however these are considered 'unringable' as the tower is thought to be too weak to deal with the forces associated with change ringing.
