= Owton =

Area of Hartlepool, County Durham, England

Coordinates: 54.658°N 1.233°W

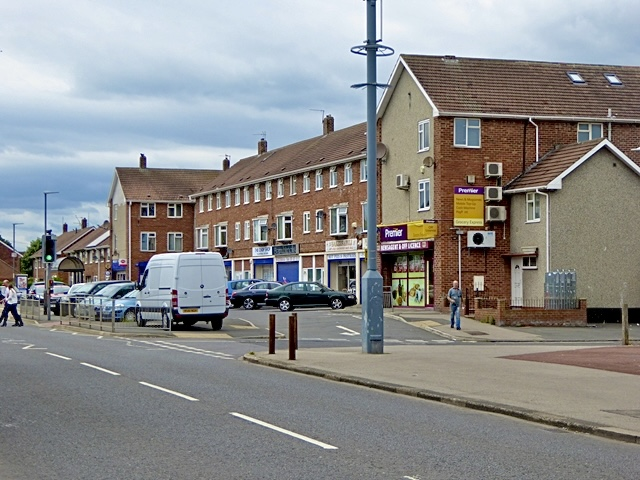
Owton Manor Lane shops

Owton is an area of south-western Hartlepool in the Borough of Hartlepool, County Durham, England. It is served by three shopping precincts, which include St. Patrick's shops, Wynyard Road shops and Owton Manor Lane shops. It is near the area of Rift House, village of Greatham and less than 2 miles away from Seaton Carew.

== History ==
Owton Manor Estate was developed as a social housing estate in the 1960’s.

== Churches ==
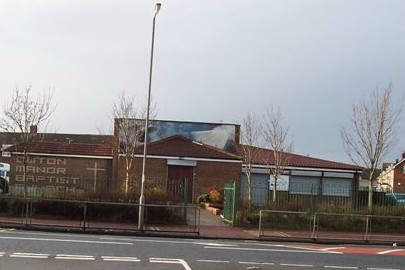
The baptist church

Owton is served by three local churches: St James Church of England, St Patrick's Roman Catholic Church and Owton Manor Baptist Church.

== Households and People ==
Figures from the Hartlepool Borough Council 2019 Ward Profiles show Manor House Ward had a population of 8,586 people. 2,040 were aged 15 or under, 5,188 were aged between 16 and 64 and 1,358 were over 65.

Streets in the area are grouped by the first letter into blocks named after towns in Scotland, for example, the 'M Block' would be a gathering of M-Streets. The houses are predominantly social housing, 56.3% with 4.9% privately rented and 33.6% owner occupied.

== Economic ==
31.6% of those of working age are receiving benefits 38.1% of pupils are eligible for free school meals 56.8% of households have no car. 43.2% of households have no one working

Average weekly income £430 (2007/2008)

Ranked 152 out of 7932 wards in the national Index of Multiple Deprivation Ranked 5 out of 116 wards in the Tees Valley Index of Multiple Deprivation

== Education ==
- Primary Schools which serve the area include Eskdale Academy, St. Teresa's, Grange and Rossmere. The only secondary school serving the area is Manor Community Academy.
- 27% of adults are classed as having low literacy skills
- 69% of adults are classed as having low numeracy skills.
- 53.7% of people aged 16 to 74 had no qualifications
- 15.7% of people aged 16 to 74 had 1-4 GCSEs
- 16.3% of people aged 16 to 74 had 5+GCSEs/1 A level
- 3.8% of people aged 16 to 74 had 2+A levels
- 4.1% of people aged 16 to 74 had a degree, HNC or Professional qualification.
- Manor Community Academy was built on the site of the Manor Comprehensive School and opened in 2016.
