= Dalton Piercy =

Village in County Durham, England

Coordinates: 54.673000°N 1.2826900°W

- Village and civil parish
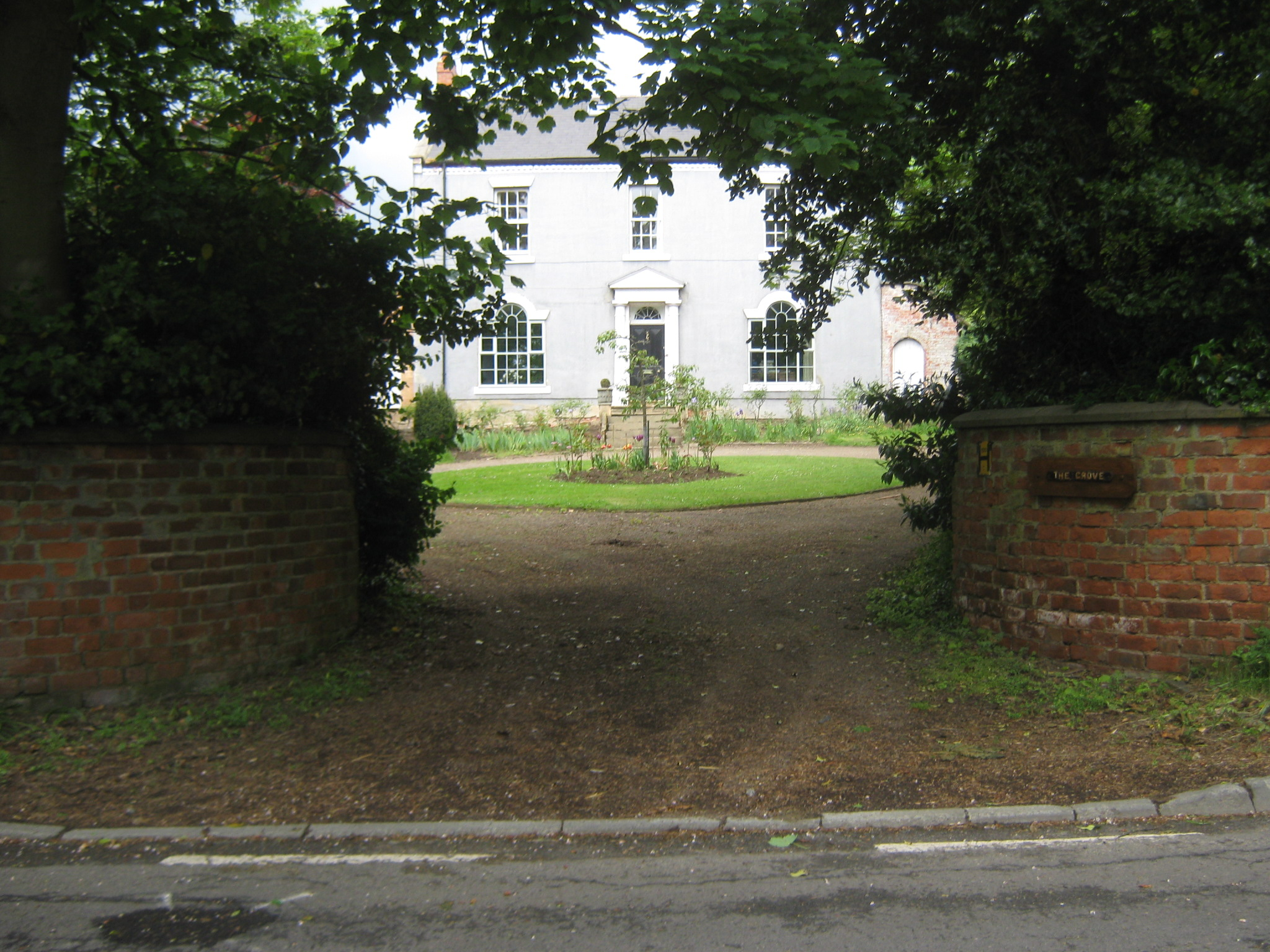
- The Grove

- Location within County Durham
- Population: 289 (2011. including Brierton)
- OS grid reference: NZ4635731117
- Unitary authority: Hartlepool
- Ceremonial county: County Durham
- Region: North East
- Country: England
- Sovereign state: United Kingdom
- Post town: HARTLEPOOL
- Postcode district: TS27
- Police: Durham
- Fire: County Durham and Darlington
- Ambulance: North East
- UK Parliament: Hartlepool

Dalton Piercy is a village and civil parish in the borough of Hartlepool, County Durham, in England. The population of the civil parish taken at the 2011 Cernsus was 289.

== Location ==
Dalton Piercy is situated 1 mile east of the A19 and 1 mile to the west of Hartlepool. It is situated just north of industrialised Teesside. The village has a village hall but no shops. Most of the houses are built around a central village green, with some modern cul-de-sacs to the west of the village.

== Governance ==
In May 2021, the parish council, alongside the parish councils of the villages of Elwick, Hart, and Greatham all issued individual votes of no confidence in Hartlepool Borough Council, and expressed their desire to re-join County Durham.
