= Hart, County Durham =

Coordinates: 54°42′27″N 1°16′16″W

Hart
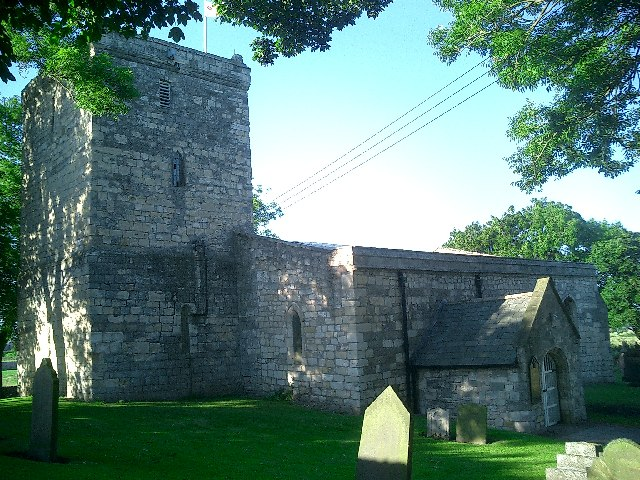
- St Mary Magdalene Church, Hart

- Location within County Durham
- Population: 771 (2011)
- OS grid reference: NZ4717634987
- Unitary authority: Hartlepool
- Ceremonial county: County Durham
- Region: North East
- Country: England
- Sovereign state: United Kingdom
- Post town: HARTLEPOOL
- Postcode district: TS27
- Police: Cleveland
- Fire: Cleveland
- Ambulance: North East
- UK Parliament: Hartlepool

Hart is a village and civil parish in County Durham, England, northwest of Hartlepool.

== History ==
Evidence of occupation in Hart can be seen from 6000 BC, with farming first appearing around 3500 BC. By 1000 BC the area was more extensively settled, including farming buildings and field systems. Activity increased around 650 AD with the establishment of St Hilda's Monastery in Hartlepool. The monastery was destroyed by Vikings in the 9th and 10th centuries, whose lords continued to inhabit Hart.

Robert de Brus, 1st Lord of Annandale gained control of the area in around 1119, with control passing to the Clifford family in 1306 following Robert de Brus, 7th Lord of Annandale's accession to the Scottish throne.

In 1587 the parish suffered from the plague, and it was noted in the parish register that "89 corpses were buried, whereof tenne were strangers". In 1652 John Pasmore was buried "on Black Monday 29 March. There was a star appeared in the South-east, ye sun eclipsed."

In 1596 Ellen Thompson was condemned as a witch and buried under the stile of St Mary Magdalene church (the mother church of St Hilda's) at the east entrance to the churchyard. Another woman, known as Old Mother Midnight of Elwick, may have been buried in the same place in 1641. Other Hart women accused of witchcraft include Helen de Inferno (1454) and Alison Lawe (1582).

The Jesuit Thomas Ellerker was born in Hart in 1738.

In May 2021, the parish council alongside the parish councils of the villages of Elwick, Dalton Piercy and Greatham all issued individual votes of no confidence in Hartlepool Borough Council, and expressed their desire to re-join County Durham.

== Manor house and church ==
In the late 1100s the de Brus family build the manor house and chapel; the latter remains as the basis of the St Mary Magdalene Church. Following Robert Brus VII's attempt on the Scottish throne in 1306 the manor farm is one of the assets seized by the English authorities and given to the Clifford family. The Cliffords hold ownership until 1586, when it is sold to John Lord Lumley, and it is sold to Sir George Pocock in 1770. In 1830 the estate passes to William Henry, Duke of Cleveland, and is subsequently inherited by Frederick Aclom Milbank, whose family own the manor until at least 1928. Only a little of the original manor and its associated buildings can still be seen, including an 18th-century outbuilding wall and a section of 14th-century wall, which is a scheduled monument.

The Norman-era St Mary Magdalene Church is Grade I listed and has undergone significant modification since it was built, including the carving of St George and the Dragon on the south exterior wall. The church is part of the Durham Diocese and is (current to 2017) a Church of England parish church.

== Bog ==
Just outside the village is Hart Bog, which is on the List of Sites of Special Scientific Interest in Cleveland.

== Climate ==
Climate in this area has small differences between highs and lows and there is adequate rainfall year-round. The Köppen Climate Classification subtype for this climate is "Cfb" (Marine West Coast Climate/Oceanic climate).

Climate data for Hart
| Month | Jan | Feb | Mar | Apr | May | Jun | Jul | Aug | Sep | Oct | Nov | Dec | Year |
|---|---|---|---|---|---|---|---|---|---|---|---|---|---|
| Mean daily maximum °C (°F) | 7 (45) | 8 (46) | 10 (50) | 12 (54) | 15 (59) | 18 (64) | 21 (70) | 20 (68) | 17 (63) | 14 (57) | 10 (50) | 7 (45) | 13 (55) |
| Mean daily minimum °C (°F) | 3 (37) | 2 (36) | 3 (37) | 5 (41) | 7 (45) | 10 (50) | 12 (54) | 12 (54) | 10 (50) | 7 (45) | 4 (39) | 2 (36) | 6 (43) |
| Average precipitation days | 18 | 15 | 15 | 16 | 14 | 15 | 14 | 14 | 14 | 17 | 17 | 16 | 185 |
Source: Weatherbase

Images of Hart Village

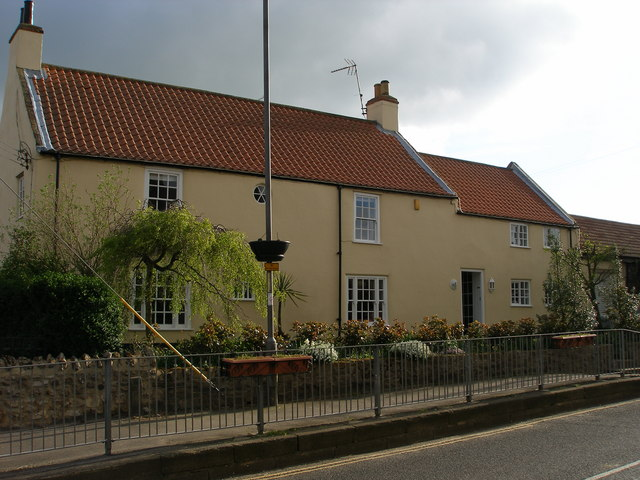
Holme Farm

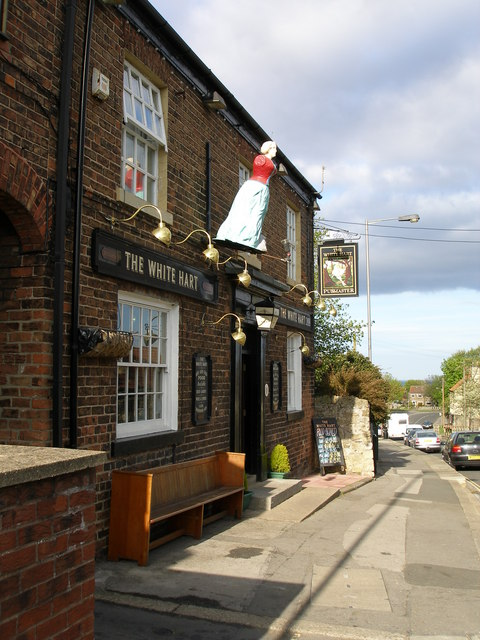
The White Hart Public House

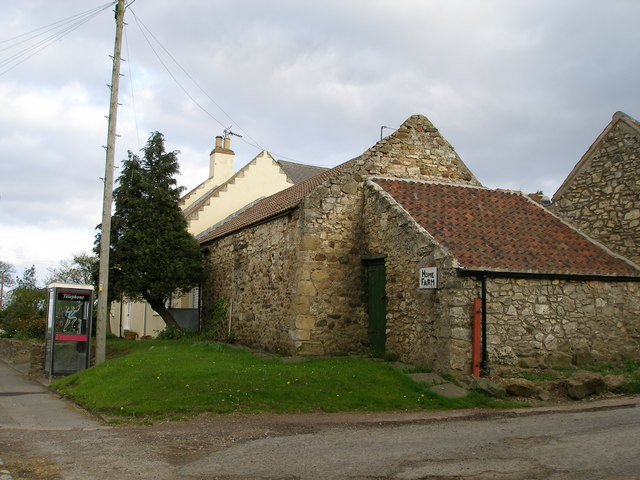
Stepped sides of buildings in Hart Village

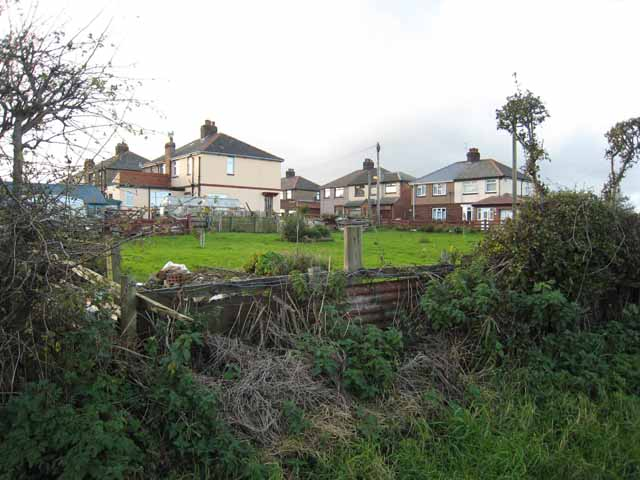
Burns Close

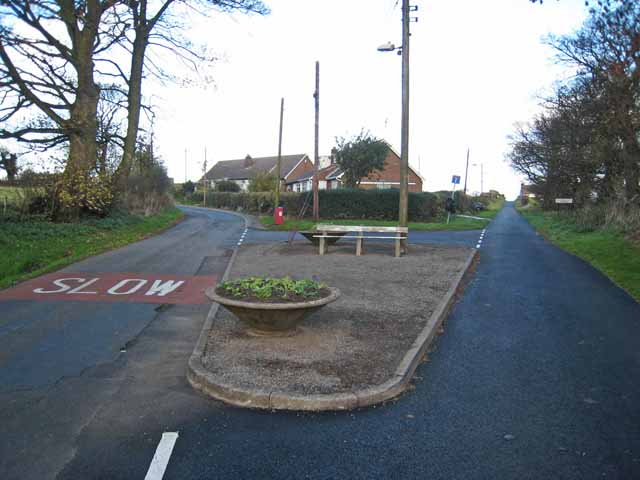
Parting of the ways

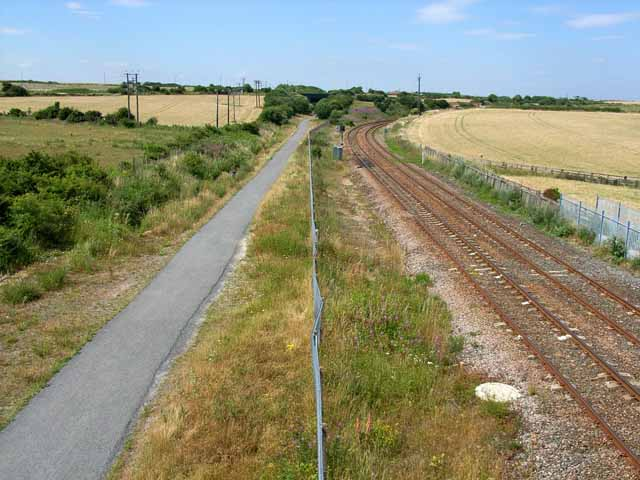
Hart village "station", former site
