= Headland, Hartlepool =

Civil parish in Hartlepool, County Durham, England

Coordinates: 54.70°N 1.19°W

Headland
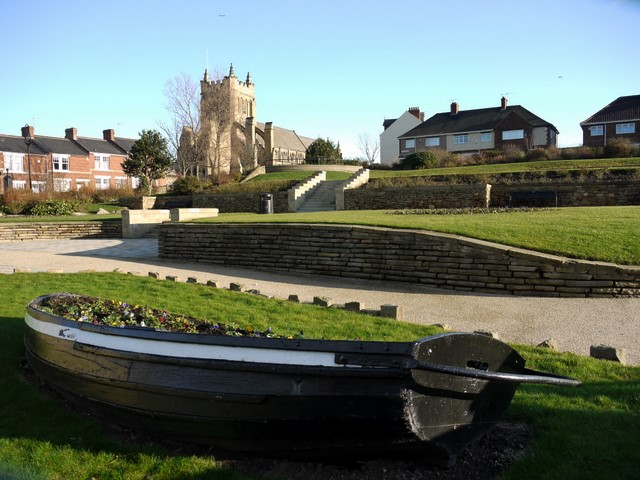
- Croft Gardens

- Location within County Durham
- Area: 0.9227 km^{2} (0.3563 sq mi)
- Population: 3,543 (2024 estimate)
  - Density: 3,840/km^{2} (9,900/sq mi)
- Civil parish: Headland
- Unitary authority: Hartlepool
- Ceremonial county: Durham
- Region: North East
- Country: England
- Sovereign state: United Kingdom
- Police: Cleveland
- Fire: Cleveland
- Ambulance: North East

Headland is a civil parish in the Borough of Hartlepool, County Durham, England. The parish covers the old part of Hartlepool and nearby villages. In 2024 the parish had an estimated population of 3543.

== History ==
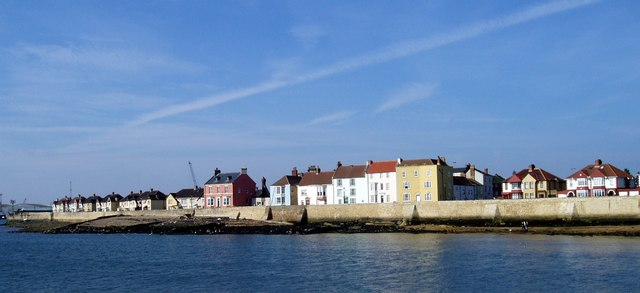
Hartlepool Headland showing the town wall built in the Middle Ages.

The Heugh Battery, one of three constructed to protect the port of Hartlepool in 1860, is located in the area along with a museum.

The area made national headlines in July 1994 in connection with the murder of Rosie Palmer, a local toddler.

On 19 March 2002 the Time Team searched for an Anglo-Saxon monastery.

== See also ==
- St Hilda's Church, Hartlepool
- St Mary's Church, Hartlepool
