= Claxton, County Durham =

Coordinates: 54.6496°N 1.2601°W

Claxton
- Location within County Durham
- Population: 25 (2001)
- Civil parish: Claxton
- Unitary authority: County Durham
- Ceremonial county: County Durham
- Region: North East
- Country: England
- Sovereign state: United Kingdom
- Post town: HARTLEPOOL
- Postcode district: TS27
- Police: Durham
- Fire: County Durham and Darlington
- Ambulance: North East
- UK Parliament: Hartlepool

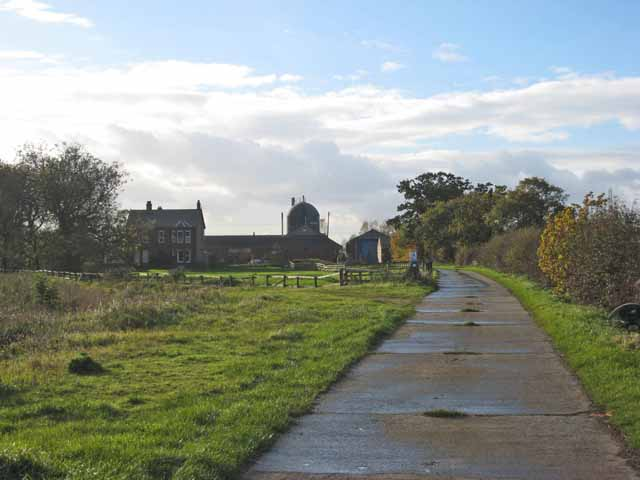
Claxton Grange Farm, Claxton

Claxton is a civil parish in County Durham, England. It is located to the south west of Hartlepool, and mostly separated from the neighbouring parish of Greatham by the A689 road. It had a population of 25 at the 2001 Census.

== History ==
Claxton was a township in Greatham parish. Claxton takes its name from the Claxton family, who were the landowners from the 12th century to the 15th century.

In 1866 Caxton became a civil parish in its own right.
