= Cleveland Fire Brigade =

Fire and rescue service in north east England

Operational area
- Country: England
- Boroughs: Hartlepool, Middlesbrough, Redcar & Cleveland, and Stockton-on-Tees

Agency overview
- Employees: approximately 600
- Chief Fire Officer: Peter Rickard

Facilities and equipment
- Stations: 14

Website
- www.clevelandfire.gov.uk

Cleveland Fire Brigade is the statutory fire and rescue service covering the boroughs of Hartlepool, Middlesbrough, Redcar & Cleveland, and Stockton-on-Tees in the North East of England. The name originates from the former county of Cleveland which was abolished in 1996. The brigade’s area is split between the ceremonial counties of County Durham and North Yorkshire.

Cleveland is organised operationally into four Districts: Hartlepool, Middlesbrough, Redcar & Cleveland, and Stockton-on-Tees.

== History ==
The brigade's history started in April 1968 as the Teesside County Fire Brigade, which incorporated the Middlesbrough Fire Brigade. However, six years later, the Local Government Re-organisation Act (1974) amalgamated the Teesside Fire County Fire Brigade with the Hartlepool Fire Brigade, and also took five North Riding Fire Brigade stations (Guisborough, Loftus, Saltburn, Skelton and Yarm) to form the Cleveland County Fire Brigade. Another re-organisation in 1996 saw a name change to Cleveland Fire Brigade.

In 2012, the brigade set up a company called The Cleveland Fire Brigade Risk Management Services CIC to provide private contractual services. The first contract was one whereby the brigade provided fire cover to Ineos Nitriles based on Teesside, which paid several millions of pounds that Chief Fire Officer Ian Hayton stated would go back into the brigades finances as they were expecting a cut in their budget. The brigade featured in a television documentary filmed in November 2013. TV crews followed the firefighters on Bonfire Night, their busiest night of the year.

== Performance ==
Every fire and rescue service in England and Wales is periodically subjected to a statutory inspection by His Majesty's Inspectorate of Constabulary and Fire & Rescue Services (HMICFRS). The inspection investigates how well the service performs in each of three areas. On a scale of outstanding, good, requires improvement and inadequate, Cleveland Fire and Rescue Service has been rated as follows:

HMICFRS Inspection Cleveland
Area	Rating 2018/19	Rating 2021/22	Description
Effectiveness	Good	Good	How effective is the fire and rescue service at keeping people safe and secure from fire and other risks?
Efficiency	Good	Good	How efficient is the fire and rescue service at keeping people safe and secure from fire and other risks?
People	Good	Good	How well does the fire and rescue service look after its people?

== Fire stations ==
Guisborough Fire Station

Cleveland Fire Brigade operates 14 fire stations, eight of which are crewed day and night by wholetime firefighters, and six are crewed by retained firefighters who live near to their fire station and can arrive there within five minutes of a call being received.

The brigade works in partnership with the North East Ambulance Service to provide emergency medical cover to areas of East Cleveland. The four stations in Guisborough, Saltburn, Skelton, and Loftus are in areas that have been identified as having a greater need for ambulance cover. The aim of a fire service co-responder team is to preserve life until the arrival of either a Rapid Response Vehicle (RRV) or an ambulance. The appliances are equipped with oxygen and automatic external defibrillation (AED) equipment.

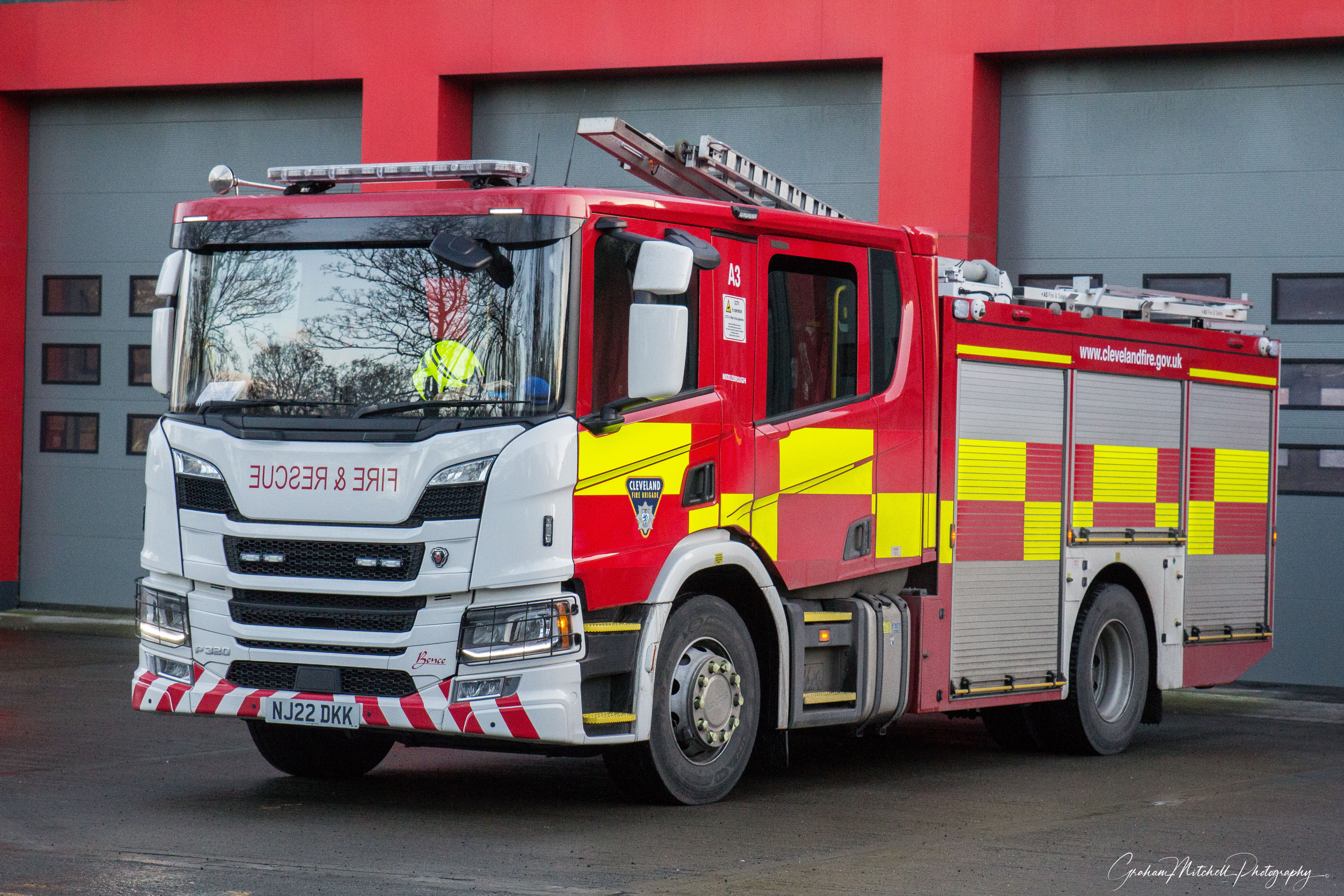
A fire engine in Middlesbrough.

== See also ==
- Fire service in the United Kingdom
- Fire apparatus
- Fire Engine
- FiReControl
- List of British firefighters killed in the line of duty
