= Grade II* listed buildings in County Durham =

County Durham shown in England

There are over 20,000 Grade II* listed buildings in England. This page is a list of these buildings in the county of Durham, sub-divided by unitary authority.

== County Durham ==
| Name | Location | Type | Completed (Note: The date given is the date used by Historic England as significant for the initial building or that of an important part in the structure's description.) | Date designated | Grid ref. (Note: The grid reference is based on the British national grid reference system, sometimes known as OSGB36, used by the Ordnance Survey.) Geo-coordinates | Entry number (Note: The "List Entry Number" is a unique number assigned to each listed building and scheduled monument by Historic England.) | Image |
|---|---|---|---|---|---|---|---|
| Barforth Hall with attached Outbuilding to North East | Barforth, County Durham | Manor House | Late Medieval | 12 January 1967 | NZ1638216695; 54°32′43″N 1°44′54″W | 1121707 | Barforth Hall with attached Outbuilding to North East More images |
| Chapel Bridge over Black Beck | Barforth, County Durham | Bridge | 14th century | 12 January 1967 | NZ1635416117; 54°32′24″N 1°44′55″W | 1121749 | Chapel Bridge over Black Beck More images |
| Dovecote 100 Metres North of St Lawrence's Chapel | Barforth, County Durham | Dovecote | Late Medieval | 19 January 1952 | NZ1641716256; 54°32′29″N 1°44′52″W | 1121750 | Dovecote 100 Metres North of St Lawrence's Chapel More images |
| Ruins of St Lawrence's Chapel | Barforth, County Durham | Farmhouse | Early C16-C18 | 12 January 1967 | NZ1640516166; 54°32′26″N 1°44′53″W | 1338613 | Ruins of St Lawrence's Chapel More images |
| Winston Bridge | Barforth, County Durham | Road Bridge | 1762-3 | 14 September 1966 | NZ1425716268; 54°32′29″N 1°46′52″W | 1323060 | Winston Bridge More images |
| Winston Bridge, over the River Tees | Barforth, County Durham | Road Bridge | 1762-3 | 19 January 1952 | NZ1425816270; 54°32′29″N 1°46′52″W | 1121747 | Winston Bridge, over the River Tees More images |
| Chapel immediately East of Barnard Castle School | Barnard Castle, County Durham | Wall | 1910-11 | 22 February 1973 | NZ0589516254; 54°32′29″N 1°54′37″W | 1201331 | Chapel immediately East of Barnard Castle School |
| Entrance Gates and Lodges to Bowes Museum | Barnard Castle, County Durham | Gate Lodge | c. 1885 | 29 September 1954 | NZ0553816183; 54°32′27″N 1°54′57″W | 1201332 | Entrance Gates and Lodges to Bowes Museum |
| Hopper Tomb approx. 2 Metres South of Church of St Mary | Barnard Castle, County Durham | Chest Tomb | 1725 | 29 January 1986 | NZ0506116265; 54°32′30″N 1°55′24″W | 1201335 | Hopper Tomb approx. 2 Metres South of Church of St Mary |
| Thorngate House and Attached Railings | Barnard Castle, County Durham | House | Mid 18th century | 24 February 1950 | NZ0496916107; 54°32′25″N 1°55′29″W | 1218873 | Upload Photo |
| 2 and 4 Market Place | Barnard Castle, County Durham | House | 17th century | 22 February 1973 | NZ0501516330; 54°32′32″N 1°55′26″W | 1217861 | 2 and 4 Market Place |
| 6, 6a, 6b, 8 and 8a Market Place | Barnard Castle, County Durham | Apartment | 1994 | 29 September 1954 | NZ0501316343; 54°32′32″N 1°55′27″W | 1201355 | Upload Photo |
| 10 and 12 Market Place | Barnard Castle, County Durham | Apartment | 1994 | 24 February 1950 | NZ0501416354; 54°32′33″N 1°55′26″W | 1201356 | Upload Photo |
| 15 and 17 Market Place | Barnard Castle, County Durham | House | 1690 | 24 February 1950 | NZ0505516386; 54°32′34″N 1°55′24″W | 1292208 | Upload Photo |
| 34 The Bank | Barnard Castle, County Durham | House | 1994 | 24 February 1950 | NZ0501516210; 54°32′28″N 1°55′26″W | 1218764 | 34 The Bank More images |
| 38–44 The Bank | Barnard Castle, County Durham | Apartment | 1994 | 24 February 1950 | NZ0500316181; 54°32′27″N 1°55′27″W | 1291777 | Upload Photo |
| 21 Galgate | Barnard Castle, County Durham | House | Mid 18th century | 24 February 1950 | NZ0503816640; 54°32′42″N 1°55′25″W | 1292565 | 21 Galgate More images |
| Barningham Park | Barningham Park, Barningham, County Durham | Country House | Late Medieval or 16th century | 19 January 1952 | NZ0862410213; 54°29′14″N 1°52′06″W | 1338635 | Upload Photo |
| Stable Block to North West of Barningham Park | Barningham Park, Barningham, County Durham | Mounting Block | Early 18th century | 12 January 1967 | NZ0857210250; 54°29′15″N 1°52′09″W | 1121712 | Upload Photo |
| Building attached to Kepier Hospital Gateway | Durham City, Belmont, County Durham | Farm Building | 19th century | 14 January 1988 | NZ2821143280; 54°47′01″N 1°33′46″W | 1323216 | Building attached to Kepier Hospital Gateway |
| Kepier Farmhouse | Belmont, County Durham | Farmhouse | C14-C20 | 10 May 1967 | NZ2825743296; 54°47′02″N 1°33′44″W | 1159216 | Kepier Farmhouse More images |
| Town Hall | Bishop Auckland, County Durham | Assembly Rooms | 1860-62 | 20 September 1972 | NZ2115730135; 54°39′57″N 1°40′25″W | 1297550 | Town Hall More images |
| 11 Market Place | Bishop Auckland, County Durham | House | Early 18th century | 21 April 1952 | NZ2128230101; 54°39′56″N 1°40′18″W | 1196607 | 11 Market Place |
| Church of St Michael and All Angels | Bishop Middleham, County Durham | Church | 1741 | 9 January 1968 | NZ3279931258; 54°40′31″N 1°29′34″W | 1322826 | Church of St Michael and All Angels More images |
| Legs Cross | Bolam, County Durham | Cross | C9 | 14 September 1966 | NZ2072122496; 54°35′50″N 1°40′51″W | 1323020 | Legs Cross More images |
| Rey Cross | Bowes, County Durham | Cross | 10th century | 17 June 1986 | NY9047112284; 54°30′21″N 2°08′55″W | 1323025 | Rey Cross More images |
| Holywell Hall and the West Wing | Brancepeth, County Durham | House | 16th century | 16 September 1975 | NZ2502937328; 54°43′49″N 1°36′46″W | 1120764 | Upload Photo |
| Quarry Hill and adjoining Outbuilding | Brancepeth, County Durham | House | Early-Mid 17th century | 10 May 1967 | NZ2154538662; 54°44′33″N 1°40′01″W | 1323203 | Upload Photo |
| Littleburn Farmhouse | Brandon and Byshottles, County Durham | Farmhouse | Late 17th century | 10 March 1988 | NZ2559939229; 54°44′51″N 1°36′14″W | 1159109 | Upload Photo |
| Little Holmside | Burnhope, County Durham | House | 1668 | 17 January 1967 | NZ1997549276; 54°50′16″N 1°41′26″W | 1185989 | Upload Photo |
| The Castle | Castle Eden Dene, Castle Eden, County Durham | Country House | c. 1765 | 8 December 1967 | NZ4275838792; 54°44′32″N 1°20′15″W | 1323098 | The Castle More images |
| Church of St. Mary | Cockfield, County Durham | Parish Church | 13th century | 30 September 1987 | NZ1290324244; 54°36′47″N 1°48′06″W | 1121827 | Church of St. Mary More images |
| Balder Bridge | Cotherstone, County Durham | Road Bridge | 15th century | 12 January 1967 | NZ0091420031; 54°34′32″N 1°59′15″W | 1121041 | Balder Bridge More images |
| Haybarn and Rear Yard Walls 110 Metres East of Croxdale Hall | Croxdale Hall, Croxdale and Hett, County Durham | Wall | Late C18-Early 19th century | 7 December 1987 | NZ2744437896; 54°44′07″N 1°34′31″W | 1323222 | Haybarn and Rear Yard Walls 110 Metres East of Croxdale Hall |
| Low Butterby Farmhouse and Barn Adjoining at South-east | Low Butterby, Croxdale and Hett, County Durham | Farmhouse | 17th century | 28 February 1952 | NZ2756039369; 54°44′55″N 1°34′24″W | 1323186 | Low Butterby Farmhouse and Barn Adjoining at South-east More images |
| Moat Walls, 2 Bridges Across Moat, Garden Wall and Gate Piers at Low Butterby Farm | Low Butterby, Croxdale and Hett, County Durham | Gate Pier | Late 18th century | 10 May 1967 | NZ2758839382; 54°44′55″N 1°34′23″W | 1159261 | Moat Walls, 2 Bridges Across Moat, Garden Wall and Gate Piers at Low Butterby Farm More images |
| Priest's House 90 Metres East of Croxdale Hall | Croxdale Hall, Croxdale and Hett, County Durham | Priests House | Early 18th century | 8 December 1982 | NZ2742537876; 54°44′06″N 1°34′32″W | 1120739 | Upload Photo |
| Church of St Andrew | Dalton-le-Dale, County Durham | Church | 17th century | 20 February 1967 | NZ4079748034; 54°49′32″N 1°21′59″W | 1231690 | Church of St Andrew More images |
| Dalton Water Pumping Station | Dalton Pumping Station, Dalton-le-Dale, County Durham | Boiler House | 1873-1879 | 8 February 1983 | NZ4108246918; 54°48′56″N 1°21′44″W | 1277461 | Dalton Water Pumping Station More images |
| Farmhouse and adjacent Barn 15 Metres to North of Seaton Holme | Easington Village, County Durham | Farmhouse | Possibly 13th century | 29 September 1990 | NZ4136543548; 54°47′06″N 1°21′30″W | 1277424 | Farmhouse and adjacent Barn 15 Metres to North of Seaton Holme |
| Eggleston Bridge | Eggleston, County Durham | Road Bridge | 15th century | 12 January 1967 | NY9967423228; 54°36′15″N 2°00′24″W | 1338580 | Eggleston Bridge More images |
| Eggleston Hall | Eggleston, County Durham | House | Pre 1827 | 7 January 1952 | NY9977023345; 54°36′19″N 2°00′18″W | 1121626 | Eggleston Hall More images |
| Bounds Wall with Racket Ball Courts | Ushaw, Esh, County Durham | Boundary Wall | 1850-1852 | 24 June 1987 | NZ2206743851; 54°47′21″N 1°39′30″W | 1185962 | Upload Photo |
| Former Junior Seminary Chapel of St Aloysius | Ushaw, Esh, County Durham | Theological College | 1857-9 | 24 June 1987 | NZ2177343689; 54°47′15″N 1°39′47″W | 1299434 | Former Junior Seminary Chapel of St Aloysius More images |
| Gate Piers at Entrance to Yard of Esh Hall Farm | Esh, Esh, County Durham | Gate Pier | 17th century | 24 June 1987 | NZ1971043896; 54°47′22″N 1°41′42″W | 1299431 | Upload Photo |
| Stations Cloister with Chapel of St Charles and Oratory Chapel | Ushaw, Esh, County Durham | Private Chapel | 1852-3 | 24 June 1987 | NZ2182643714; 54°47′16″N 1°39′44″W | 1319920 | Upload Photo |
| Ushaw Home Farm Main Block and Wall Attached | Ushaw, Esh, County Durham | Cow House | 1851-2 | 17 January 1967 | NZ2146743616; 54°47′13″N 1°40′04″W | 1185963 | Upload Photo |
| Forecourt walls and south tower of Witton Castle | Evenwood and Barony, County Durham | Tower | Medieval | 14 September 1966 | NZ1537130411; 54°40′07″N 1°45′48″W | 1338595 | Upload Photo |
| Witton Castle | Evenwood and Barony, County Durham | Castle | Late 14th century | 7 January 1952 | NZ1537230431; 54°40′07″N 1°45′47″W | 1311117 | Witton Castle More images |
| Little Chilton Farmhouse, and Mounting Block Attached | Little Chilton, Ferryhill, County Durham | House | 14th century | 14 June 1988 | NZ2950231436; 54°40′38″N 1°32′38″W | 1159411 | Upload Photo |
| Finchale Abbey Farmhouse | Finchale Priory, Framwellgate Moor, County Durham | Farmhouse | c. 1700 | 14 January 1988 | NZ2962447176; 54°49′07″N 1°32′26″W | 1323217 | Upload Photo |
| Dovecote, 45 Metres South of Gainford Hall | Gainford, County Durham | Dovecote | 17th century | 7 January 1952 | NZ1684116805; 54°32′46″N 1°44′28″W | 1121116 | Dovecote, 45 Metres South of Gainford Hall More images |
| The former Stockton and Darlington Railway's Heighington and Aycliffe Railway Station and attached workers' housing | Great Aycliffe, County Durham | Public house | 1827 | 10 April 1980 | NZ2714022513; 54°35′49″N 1°34′53″W | 1322808 | The former Stockton and Darlington Railway's Heighington and Aycliffe Railway Station and attached workers' housing More images |
| Hamsterley Baptist Chapel | Hamsterley, County Durham | Baptist Chapel | 1774 | 5 February 1987 | NZ1185631080; 54°40′29″N 1°49′04″W | 1322775 | Hamsterley Baptist Chapel |
| Headlam Hall | Headlam, County Durham | Country House | 17th century | 7 January 1952 | NZ1802318884; 54°33′54″N 1°43′22″W | 1121082 | Headlam Hall More images |
| Hownes Gill Viaduct | Healeyfield, County Durham | Railway Viaduct | 1858 | 24 June 1987 | NZ0959049013; 54°50′09″N 1°51′08″W | 1185970 | Hownes Gill Viaduct More images |
| Hilton Hall | Hilton, County Durham | House | Medieval | 14 September 1966 | NZ1673421771; 54°35′27″N 1°44′33″W | 1121804 | Hilton Hall |
| Middleton Bridge | Holwick, County Durham | Road Bridge | c. 1800 | 12 January 1967 | NY9466025254; 54°37′21″N 2°05′03″W | 1160160 | Middleton Bridge More images |
| Horden Hall | Horden, County Durham | Manor House | Mid 17th century | 6 August 1952 | NZ4328542419; 54°46′29″N 1°19′43″W | 1120944 | Horden Hall |
| Doe Park | Hunderthwaite, County Durham | Country House | c. 1700 | 12 January 1967 | NZ0057620237; 54°34′38″N 1°59′33″W | 1323079 | Doe Park More images |
| Church of St James | Hunstanworth, County Durham | Parish Church | Medieval | 31 January 1967 | NY9490649021; 54°50′10″N 2°04′51″W | 1229537 | Church of St James More images |
| Burnhopeside Hall | Lanchester, County Durham | House | 18th century | 17 January 1967 | NZ1866946186; 54°48′37″N 1°42′40″W | 1299442 | Upload Photo |
| Burnhopeside Hall Farmhouse and Farm Buildings | Lanchester, County Durham | Farmhouse | Early 19th century | 24 June 1987 | NZ1874346146; 54°48′35″N 1°42′36″W | 1116101 | Upload Photo |
| Hamsteels Hall Farmhouse | Lanchester, County Durham | Farmhouse | Early 18th century | 2 September 1985 | NZ1741644886; 54°47′55″N 1°43′50″W | 1115409 | Hamsteels Hall Farmhouse More images |
| Hansom House, Lartington Hall, Monk's Flat & Witham Court | Lartington, County Durham | House | 1635 | 12 January 1967 | NZ0214217756; 54°33′18″N 1°58′06″W | 1310603 | Upload Photo |
| Middleton Bridge | River Tees, Middleton in Teesdale, County Durham | Bridge | c. 1814 | 14 September 1966 | NY9465925256; 54°37′21″N 2°05′03″W | 1203554 | Middleton Bridge More images |
| Stotley Hall | Middleton in Teesdale, County Durham | House | c. 1600 | 14 September 1966 | NY9680925543; 54°37′30″N 2°03′03″W | 1322782 | Upload Photo |
| Wynch Bridge | River Tees, Newbiggin, County Durham | Bridge | Pre 1757 | 14 September 1966 | NY9038327898; 54°38′46″N 2°09′02″W | 1121562 | Wynch Bridge More images |
| Iron Gates, Posts and Railings 200 Metres North West of Lambton Castle | Lambton Park, North Lodge, County Durham | Gate | c. 1820 | 1 February 1967 | NZ2964952674; 54°52′05″N 1°32′22″W | 1311161 | Upload Photo |
| Lamb Bridge | Lambton Park, North Lodge, County Durham | Bridge | 1819 | 23 February 1987 | NZ2943952429; 54°51′57″N 1°32′34″W | 1120952 | Upload Photo |
| Lambton Castle | Lambton Park, North Lodge, County Durham | Country House | 18th century | 4 June 1952 | NZ2982852570; 54°52′01″N 1°32′12″W | 1159138 | Lambton Castle More images |
| Apollo Pavilion | Peterlee, County Durham | Pavilion | 1969 | 14 December 2011 | NZ4222339633; 54°45′00″N 1°20′44″W | 1400364 | Apollo Pavilion More images |
| Dutch Barn c.300 Metres North of Stables and Coach House | Raby Park, Raby with Keverstone, County Durham | Hay Barn | Third Quarter 18th century | 14 September 1966 | NZ1293422078; 54°35′37″N 1°48′05″W | 1121777 | Upload Photo |
| Raby Home Farm with Walls Attached | Raby Park, Raby with Keverstone, County Durham | Model Farm | Mid 18th century | 14 September 1966 | NZ1101821865; 54°35′31″N 1°49′52″W | 1121775 | Upload Photo |
| Stables and Coachhouse, with Wall and Mounting-block attached | Raby Park, Raby with Keverstone, County Durham | Wall | Third Quarter 18th century | 14 September 1966 | NZ1290222043; 54°35′36″N 1°48′07″W | 1121776 | Stables and Coachhouse, with Wall and Mounting-block attached |
| The Folly in Raby Park | Raby with Keverstone, County Durham | Folly | 1780 | 14 September 1966 | NZ1276623152; 54°36′12″N 1°48′14″W | 1121773 | Upload Photo |
| The Old Lodge | Raby with Keverstone, County Durham | Fortified House | Late Medieval | 14 September 1966 | NZ0901922183; 54°35′41″N 1°51′43″W | 1338624 | Upload Photo |
| Church of St Mary | Rokeby, County Durham | Parish Church | 1778 | 12 January 1967 | NZ0725713808; 54°31′10″N 1°53′22″W | 1121673 | Church of St Mary More images |
| Greta Bridge | Greta Bridge, Rokeby, County Durham | Bridge | 1773 | 12 January 1967 | NZ0861113168; 54°30′49″N 1°52′07″W | 1160430 | Greta Bridge More images |
| Eggleston Bridge | River Tees, Romaldkirk, County Durham | Bridge | 15th century | 7 January 1952 | NY9966723228; 54°36′15″N 2°00′24″W | 1121638 | Eggleston Bridge More images |
| Scargill Castle | Scargill, County Durham | Castle | 15th century | 12 January 1967 | NZ0535310726; 54°29′31″N 1°55′08″W | 1121820 | Scargill Castle More images |
| Dalden Tower | Seaham, County Durham | Hall House | 14th century or Earlier | 21 June 1950 | NZ4202448742; 54°49′54″N 1°20′50″W | 1232268 | Dalden Tower More images |
| The Londonderry Institute and Forecourt Wall | Seaham, County Durham | Wall | 1853-5 | 21 June 1950 | NZ4282849618; 54°50′22″N 1°20′05″W | 1232455 | The Londonderry Institute and Forecourt Wall |
| Gothick Gatehouse to Hardwick Park | Sedgefield, County Durham | Tower | c. 1764 | 29 April 1952 | NZ3462028838; 54°39′12″N 1°27′54″W | 1322811 | Gothick Gatehouse to Hardwick Park More images |
| Magistrates Court House | Sedgefield, County Durham | House | 1707 | 29 April 1952 | NZ3545728806; 54°39′11″N 1°27′07″W | 1121492 | Magistrates Court House More images |
| Locomotive coaling drops | Shildon, County Durham | Railway locomotive coaling drops | 1846 | 11 May 2021 | NZ2347625729; 54°37′34″N 1°38′16″W | 1160320 | Locomotive coaling drops More images |
| Soho Engine Shed, originally Kilburns' warehouse | Shildon, County Durham | Railway locomotive engine shed, originally warehouse | 1826 | 11 May 2021 | NZ2330825771; 54°37′36″N 1°38′26″W | 1310628 | Soho Engine Shed, originally Kilburns' warehouse |
| Sherburn Hospital Chapel | Sherburn Hospital, Shincliffe, County Durham | Chapel | c. 1181 | 28 February 1952 | NZ3085841581; 54°46′06″N 1°31′19″W | 1159384 | Sherburn Hospital Chapel More images |
| Sherburn Hospital Gatehouse, Office Wing, Lodge and Wall | Sherburn Hospital, Shincliffe, County Durham | Wall | 14th century | 10 May 1967 | NZ3077441540; 54°46′04″N 1°31′24″W | 1311049 | Upload Photo |
| Church of St.john the Evangelist | Kirk Merrington, Spennymoor, County Durham | Parish Church | Norman | 30 January 1951 | NZ2622831464; 54°40′39″N 1°35′41″W | 1310889 | Church of St.john the Evangelist More images |
| Tudhoe Hall Farm and Tudhoe Hall | Tudhoe, Spennymoor, County Durham | House | Early 17th century | 30 March 1951 | NZ2584435636; 54°42′54″N 1°36′01″W | 1121440 | Tudhoe Hall Farm and Tudhoe Hall |
| 7/8 Stone Houses | Stanhope | House | 1533 | 31 January 1967 | NY9974839270; 54°44′54″N 2°00′20″W | 1231097 | 7/8 Stone Houses More images |
| Church of St Thomas | Stanhope, County Durham | Church | 1727 | 31 January 1967 | NY9970039229; 54°44′53″N 2°00′22″W | 1231701 | Church of St Thomas More images |
| Greenhead Farmhouse and Outbuilding Attached | Stanhope, County Durham | Farmhouse | 17th century | 31 January 1967 | NY9772539627; 54°45′06″N 2°02′13″W | 1230040 | Greenhead Farmhouse and Outbuilding Attached More images |
| Low Bishopley Farmhouse and Barn Adjoining | Bishopley, Stanhope, County Durham | Farmhouse | 17th century | 25 March 1986 | NZ0248635957; 54°43′07″N 1°57′47″W | 1278846 | Low Bishopley Farmhouse and Barn Adjoining More images |
| Newhouse, and Walls Attached | Newhouse, Stanhope, County Durham | House | 17th century | 31 January 1967 | NY8729038878; 54°44′41″N 2°11′56″W | 1232062 | Newhouse, and Walls Attached More images |
| Park Level Mine Jigger House and Crushing Mill Water Wheel | Killhope, Stanhope, County Durham | Crushing Mill | 1970 | 5 June 1987 | NY8267842973; 54°46′53″N 2°16′15″W | 1278814 | Park Level Mine Jigger House and Crushing Mill Water Wheel More images |
| Stanhope Bridge over River Wear | Stanhope, Stanhope, County Durham | Bridge | Medieval | 31 January 1967 | NY9851939084; 54°44′48″N 2°01′28″W | 1277203 | Stanhope Bridge over River Wear More images |
| Stanhope Castle | Stanhope, County Durham | Flats | 1987 | 5 June 1987 | NY9961839155; 54°44′50″N 2°00′27″W | 1231718 | Stanhope Castle More images |
| Stanhope Hall | Stanhope, County Durham | House | Pre 16th century | 31 January 1967 | NY9896139377; 54°44′58″N 2°01′04″W | 1277202 | Stanhope Hall More images |
| Unthank Hall | Stanhope, County Durham | House | 16th century | 31 January 1967 | NY9911739107; 54°44′49″N 2°00′55″W | 1230062 | Unthank Hall More images |
| Westernhopeburn West Farmhouse and Adjoining Outbuilding | Eastgate, Stanhope, County Durham | Farmhouse | 1606 | 31 January 1967 | NY9350437845; 54°44′08″N 2°06′09″W | 1232384 | Westernhopeburn West Farmhouse and Adjoining Outbuilding More images |
| Westgate Primitive Methodist Chapel | Westgate, Stanhope, County Durham | Church School | 1871 | 5 June 1987 | NY9055238033; 54°44′14″N 2°08′54″W | 1232510 | Westgate Primitive Methodist Chapel More images |
| Beamish Hall | Beamish, Stanley, County Durham | House | late C16/early 17th century | 19 July 1950 | NZ2119154843; 54°53′16″N 1°40′16″W | 1260862 | Beamish Hall More images |
| Garden Wall, Piers, Gates, and House attached at Beamish Hall Gardens | Beamish, Stanley, County Durham | Bath House | Early 18th century | 1 October 1986 | NZ2092854692; 54°53′12″N 1°40′31″W | 1240739 | Upload Photo |
| Tanfield Hall | Tanfield, Stanley, County Durham | House | 17th century | 19 July 1950 | NZ1886755455; 54°53′37″N 1°42′27″W | 1240892 | Tanfield Hall More images |
| Pele Tower on East Return of Pockerley Farmhouse | Urpeth, County Durham | Pele Tower | 15th century | 23 February 1987 | NZ2225154578; 54°53′08″N 1°39′17″W | 1159269 | Pele Tower on East Return of Pockerley Farmhouse More images |
| The Old Hall | West Auckland, County Durham | Farmhouse | 16th century | 21 April 1952 | NZ1801426251; 54°37′52″N 1°43′21″W | 1209888 | The Old Hall More images |
| Church of St Mary and 2 Arches attached to North | West Rainton, County Durham | Parish Church | 1864 | 10 May 1967 | NZ3229646884; 54°48′57″N 1°29′56″W | 1120737 | Church of St Mary and 2 Arches attached to North More images |
| Abbey Bridge | Westwick, County Durham | Road Bridge | 1773 | 7 January 1952 | NZ0661814943; 54°31′47″N 1°53′57″W | 1310824 | Abbey Bridge More images |
| Whorlton Bridge | Whorlton, County Durham | Suspension Bridge | 1829-1831 | 7 January 1952 | NZ1066714571; 54°31′35″N 1°50′12″W | 1160013 | Whorlton Bridge More images |
| Clock Tower North of Windlestone Hall | Windlestone Park, Windlestone, County Durham | Gate | Early 19th century | 9 January 1968 | NZ2636928755; 54°39′12″N 1°35′34″W | 1160369 | Upload Photo |
| Windlestone Hall Residential School | Windlestone Park, Windlestone, County Durham | House | 16th century | 9 January 1968 | NZ2636128676; 54°39′09″N 1°35′35″W | 1160327 | Windlestone Hall Residential School More images |
| Stubb House | Winston, County Durham | Country House | Mid 18th century | 14 September 1966 | NZ1212415794; 54°32′14″N 1°48′51″W | 1160036 | Stubb House |
| Westholme Hall | Winston, County Durham | Manor House | 1606 | 7 January 1952 | NZ1385317926; 54°33′23″N 1°47′14″W | 1121056 | Westholme Hall More images |
| Witton Hall and Wall Attached | Witton Gilbert, County Durham | House | 12th and 18th century | 28 February 1952 | NZ2349645408; 54°48′11″N 1°38′10″W | 1120696 | |
| Witton Bridge, Partly in Crook and Willington Parish, Wear Valley District | Witton Le Wear, County Durham | Bridge | c. 1788 | 30 September 1987 | NZ1478330731; 54°40′17″N 1°46′20″W | 1121837 | Witton Bridge, Partly in Crook and Willington Parish, Wear Valley District More images |
| Witton Tower | Witton Le Wear, County Durham | House | Medieval | 17 April 1952 | NZ1435431320; 54°40′36″N 1°46′44″W | 1229013 | Upload Photo |
| Coves House Farmhouse | Wolsingham, County Durham | Farmhouse | Late Medieval | 5 June 1987 | NZ0531136312; 54°43′18″N 1°55′09″W | 1232636 | Upload Photo |
| Gazebo/dovecote in Garden of Bishop Oak | Wolsingham, County Durham | Dovecote | Mid 18th century | 31 January 1967 | NZ0667239150; 54°44′50″N 1°53′52″W | 1276768 | Gazebo/dovecote in Garden of Bishop Oak More images |
| Low Harperley Farmhouse | Wolsingham, County Durham | Farmhouse | 1967 | 31 January 1967 | NZ1196734912; 54°42′33″N 1°48′57″W | 1276972 | Low Harperley Farmhouse More images |
| Whitfield House | Wolsingham, County Durham | House | c. 1750 | 31 January 1967 | NZ0744737199; 54°43′47″N 1°53′09″W | 1276869 | Upload Photo |
| Girlington Hall Farmhouse | Girlington, Wycliffe with Thorpe, County Durham | Cross Wing House | Early 14th century or Early 15th century | 19 January 1952 | NZ1283213753; 54°31′08″N 1°48′12″W | 1161242 | Upload Photo |
| Thorpe Farmhouse and Adjacent Outbuildings | Wycliffe with Thorpe, County Durham | House | Mid 18th century | 12 January 1967 | NZ0939012716; 54°30′35″N 1°51′23″W | 1322760 | Thorpe Farmhouse and Adjacent Outbuildings More images |
| Thorpe Hall | Thorpe, Wycliffe with Thorpe, County Durham | House | 13th century | 28 October 1987 | NZ1048314081; 54°31′19″N 1°50′22″W | 1121660 | Upload Photo |
| Whorlton Suspension Bridge, over the River Tees | Whorlton, Wycliffe with Thorpe, County Durham | Suspension Bridge | 1829-31 | 19 January 1952 | NZ1066614563; 54°31′34″N 1°50′12″W | 1322762 | Whorlton Suspension Bridge, over the River Tees More images |
| Wycliffe Hall | Wycliffe, Wycliffe with Thorpe, County Durham | Country House | Medieval | 19 January 1952 | NZ1195014231; 54°31′24″N 1°49′01″W | 1322784 | Wycliffe Hall More images |
| Aykley Heads | Durham, County Durham | House | c. 1700 | 30 April 1971 | NZ2651743844; 54°47′20″N 1°35′21″W | 1322874 | Upload Photo |
| Bishop Cosin's Hall | Durham, County Durham | House | c. 1700 | 6 May 1952 | NZ2742742266; 54°46′28″N 1°34′31″W | 1121384 | Bishop Cosin's Hall More images |
| Burn Hall | Durham, County Durham | Country House | 1821-34 | 10 March 1988 | NZ2608438673; 54°44′32″N 1°35′47″W | 1323227 | Burn Hall More images |
| Burnopfield House | Burnopfield, County Durham | House | Third quarter 18th century | 19 July 1950 | NZ1769656781; 54°54′20″N 1°43′32″W | 1240869 | Upload Photo |
| Castle Chare Community Arts Centre | Durham, County Durham | House | Early 18th century | 10 March 1988 | NZ2712842609; 54°46′40″N 1°34′47″W | 1159303 | Upload Photo |
| Central Methodist Church | Crook, County Durham | Methodist Chapel | 1868 | 5 June 1987 | NZ1661535502; 54°42′51″N 1°44′37″W | 1229012 | Central Methodist Church |
| Chester New Bridge | Chester-le-Street, County Durham | Bridge | 15th century | 23 February 1987 | NZ2844352286; 54°51′52″N 1°33′30″W | 1323102 | Chester New Bridge More images |
| Chorister School | Durham, County Durham | House | Medieval | 6 May 1952 | NZ2725942008; 54°46′20″N 1°34′40″W | 1120693 | Chorister School More images |
| Church of St Ebba | Ebchester, County Durham | Parish Church | 12th century | 6 June 1951 | NZ1036555450; 54°53′37″N 1°50′24″W | 1240418 | Church of St Ebba More images |
| Church of St Oswald | Durham, County Durham | Parish Church | Late 12th century | 6 May 1952 | NZ2758541915; 54°46′17″N 1°34′22″W | 1120678 | Church of St Oswald More images |
| Cosin's Library (University Library) | Durham, County Durham | Library | 1667-8 | 19 October 1962 | NZ2734342284; 54°46′29″N 1°34′35″W | 1121382 | Cosin's Library (University Library) More images |
| Cow House of Home Farm Burn Hall | Durham, County Durham | Bull Pen | | 10 March 1988 | NZ2625838914; 54°44′40″N 1°35′37″W | 1120665 | Upload Photo |
| Crown Court | Durham, County Durham | Crown Court | c. 1811 | 6 May 1952 | NZ2784542203; 54°46′26″N 1°34′07″W | 1322878 | Crown Court More images |
| Demesne Farm Demesne House | Ebchester, County Durham | Farmhouse | 1705 | 6 June 1951 | NZ1027555455; 54°53′37″N 1°50′29″W | 1240412 | Upload Photo |
| Department of Archaeology | Durham, County Durham | House | 17th century | 30 April 1971 | NZ2747642386; 54°46′32″N 1°34′28″W | 1322896 | Department of Archaeology |
| Durham Prison Officer's Club (the Tithe Barn) | Durham, County Durham | Club | Medieval | 19 February 1970 | NZ2783841974; 54°46′19″N 1°34′08″W | 1120616 | Upload Photo |
| Friarside Chapel | Burnopfield, County Durham | Chapel | 14th century | 19 July 1950 | NZ1624757863; 54°54′55″N 1°44′53″W | 1240894 | Upload Photo |
| Hamsterley Hall, with adjoining Wall and Outbuilding | Hamsterley, County Durham | House | Early 18th century | 6 June 1951 | NZ1425755637; 54°53′43″N 1°46′45″W | 1067550 | Upload Photo |
| Hunwick Hall Farmhouse and attached Wall | Hunwick, County Durham | Farmhouse | 1952 | 17 April 1952 | NZ1895432389; 54°41′10″N 1°42′27″W | 1229021 | Hunwick Hall Farmhouse and attached Wall More images |
| Hunwick Hall, North West and North East Ranges | Durham, County Durham | Manor House | Medieval | 17 April 1952 | NZ1894932416; 54°41′11″N 1°42′27″W | 1279133 | Hunwick Hall, North West and North East Ranges |
| Leap Mill Farmhouse and Aqueduct Wall, with Pigsty/Henhouse attached | Burnopfield, County Durham | Farmhouse | Early 18th century | 21 January 1987 | NZ1755657226; 54°54′34″N 1°43′40″W | 1240813 | Upload Photo |
| No.4 North Bailey and Castle Wall incorporated | Durham, County Durham | House | 17th century | 19 October 1962 | NZ2748542330; 54°46′31″N 1°34′27″W | 1121421 | No.4 North Bailey and Castle Wall incorporated |
| Number 12 Bridge Railway Accommodation Bridge at NZ 191 297 | Escomb, County Durham | Accommodation Bridge | 1842 | 23 May 1994 | NZ1909929624; 54°39′41″N 1°42′20″W | 1196464 | Upload Photo |
| Old Grammar School (University Music Department) | Durham, County Durham | Teachers House | Early 18th century | 6 May 1952 | NZ2730542229; 54°46′27″N 1°34′37″W | 1160796 | Old Grammar School (University Music Department) More images |
| Pontop Hall | Dipton, County Durham | Farmhouse | Late 17th century | 19 July 1950 | NZ1482553655; 54°52′39″N 1°46′14″W | 1240730 | Pontop Hall More images |
| Railway Viaduct and Drinking Fountain attached | Durham, County Durham | Drinking Fountain | 1860s | 19 February 1970 | NZ2680242570; 54°46′38″N 1°35′05″W | 1322851 | Railway Viaduct and Drinking Fountain attached More images |
| Salvation Army Citadel | Durham, County Durham | Gate | Medieval | 19 October 1962 | NZ2747042368; 54°46′32″N 1°34′28″W | 1121360 | Salvation Army Citadel More images |
| St Cuthbert's Society | Durham, County Durham | House | 17th century | 6 May 1952 | NZ2729941844; 54°46′15″N 1°34′38″W | 1121375 | St Cuthbert's Society More images |
| St John's College | Durham, County Durham | House | Early 18th century | 6 May 1952 | NZ2740141964; 54°46′19″N 1°34′32″W | 1161313 | St John's College More images |
| St John's College Second Part | Durham, County Durham | House | 17th century | 6 May 1952 | NZ2738341951; 54°46′18″N 1°34′33″W | 1161328 | St John's College Second Part |
| Statue of Third Marquess of Londonderry | Durham, County Durham | Statue | 1858 | 10 March 1988 | NZ2739642525; 54°46′37″N 1°34′32″W | 1120630 | Statue of Third Marquess of Londonderry More images |
| Town Hall and Guildhall | Durham, County Durham | Guildhall | 17th century | 19 February 1970 | NZ2737342576; 54°46′38″N 1°34′34″W | 1160184 | Town Hall and Guildhall More images |
| Water Gate | Durham, County Durham | Gate | 1787 | 6 May 1952 | NZ2724841850; 54°46′15″N 1°34′41″W | 1322920 | Water Gate More images |
| 47 and 48 Old Elvet | Durham, County Durham | Terraced House | Early 18th century | 6 May 1952 | NZ2776742352; 54°46′31″N 1°34′12″W | 1121416 | Upload Photo |
| 6 The College | Durham, County Durham | Clergy House | Medieval | 6 May 1952 | NZ2733341982; 54°46′19″N 1°34′36″W | 1120690 | 6 The College More images |
| 16 and 16a The College | Durham, County Durham | Clergy House | 17th century | 6 May 1952 | NZ2739042036; 54°46′21″N 1°34′33″W | 1120656 | 16 and 16a The College More images |
| 7 The College | Durham, County Durham | Clergy House | Medieval | 6 May 1952 | NZ2731241984; 54°46′19″N 1°34′37″W | 1311001 | 7 The College More images |

== Darlington ==
| Name | Location | Type | Completed | Date designated | Grid ref. Geo-coordinates | Entry number | Image |
|---|---|---|---|---|---|---|---|
| Barn 100 Metres East of Hall Farmhouse | Hall Farm, Archdeacon Newton, Darlington | House | Late C16-Early 17th century | 6 June 1952 | NZ2548017129; 54°32′56″N 1°36′27″W | 1322949 | Upload Photo |
| Heighington Hall | Heighington, Darlington | House | Late C17-Early 18th century | 6 June 1952 | NZ2500322434; 54°35′47″N 1°36′52″W | 1121240 | Upload Photo |
| Middridge Grange Farmhouse | Heighington, Darlington | Farmhouse | c. 1600 | 6 June 1952 | NZ2447024631; 54°36′58″N 1°37′21″W | 1121214 | Middridge Grange Farmhouse More images |
| Church of St Edwin | High Coniscliffe, Darlington | Parish Church | c. 1170 | 20 March 1967 | NZ2257815234; 54°31′55″N 1°39′09″W | 1115562 | Church of St Edwin More images |
| The Old Hall | High Coniscliffe, Darlington | House | Medieval | 6 June 1952 | NZ2253715370; 54°31′59″N 1°39′12″W | 1322964 | The Old Hall More images |
| Dovecote 45 Metres East of Manor House | Houghton Le Side, Darlington | Dovecote | 17th century or Earlier | 16 July 1986 | NZ2255821795; 54°35′27″N 1°39′09″W | 1121194 | Dovecote 45 Metres East of Manor House |
| The Old Hall | Hurworth, Darlington | House | Mid 18th century | 6 June 1952 | NZ3055410107; 54°29′07″N 1°31′48″W | 1185922 | The Old Hall More images |
| Cross Shaft Fragment About 5 Metres South West of Church of St John the Baptist | Low Dinsdale, Darlington | Cross | Late 11th century | 27 January 1988 | NZ3466811202; 54°29′42″N 1°27′59″W | 1299456 | Upload Photo |
| Stone Coffin and Lid About 3.5 Metres West of Church of St John the Baptist | Low Dinsdale, Darlington | Coffin | 11th century | 27 January 1988 | NZ3466811214; 54°29′42″N 1°27′59″W | 1185927 | Upload Photo |
| The Manor House | Low Dinsdale, Darlington | Moat | Late Medieval | 6 June 1952 | NZ3462411009; 54°29′36″N 1°28′01″W | 1185929 | Upload Photo |
| Low Middleton Hall and Former Stable on Rear | Middleton St. George, Darlington | House | 1721 | 6 June 1952 | NZ3646510885; 54°29′31″N 1°26′19″W | 1185935 | Upload Photo |
| Kerbstones Surrounding Pool in Front of Cummins Engine Factory | Morton Palms, Darlington | Pool | 1964-5 | 23 September 1992 | NZ3171413841; 54°31′08″N 1°30′42″W | 1299427 | Upload Photo |
| Security Fence at Cummins Engine Factory | Morton Palms, Darlington | Fence | 1964-5 | 23 September 1992 | NZ3171413659; 54°31′02″N 1°30′42″W | 1335834 | Upload Photo |
| The Cummins Engine Factory Including Chimney | Morton Palms, Darlington | Factory | 1964-5 | 23 September 1992 | NZ3177113739; 54°31′05″N 1°30′39″W | 1185948 | The Cummins Engine Factory Including Chimney |
| Medieval Chapel Ruins on Roman Foundations in Rear Garden of Bath House, Tees View | Piercebridge, Darlington | Chapel | 13th century | 16 July 1986 | NZ2103615632; 54°32′08″N 1°40′35″W | 1322972 | Medieval Chapel Ruins on Roman Foundations in Rear Garden of Bath House, Tees View |
| Pierce Bridge | Piercebridge, Darlington | Bridge | Early 16th century | 19 December 1951 | NZ2108215554; 54°32′05″N 1°40′33″W | 1131363 | Pierce Bridge More images |
| Piercebridge Bridge | Piercebridge, Darlington | Road Bridge | Early 16th century | 6 June 1952 | NZ2108015559; 54°32′06″N 1°40′33″W | 1145843 | Piercebridge Bridge More images |
| Sockburn Hall | Sockburn, Darlington | Country House | 1834 | 20 March 1967 | NZ3496607189; 54°27′32″N 1°27′44″W | 1116156 | Sockburn Hall More images |
| Bank Top Railway Station (main building) | Darlington | Railway Station | 1887 | 6 September 1977 | NZ2945114081; 54°31′16″N 1°32′48″W | 1310079 | Bank Top Railway Station (main building) More images |
| Barclays Bank | Darlington | Building | 1864 | 6 September 1977 | NZ2884614555; 54°31′32″N 1°33′21″W | 1322928 | Barclays Bank More images |
| Blackwell Grange (the Europa Lodge Hotel) | Darlington | Hotel | 18th century | 28 April 1952 | NZ2805613232; 54°30′49″N 1°34′05″W | 1322941 | Blackwell Grange (the Europa Lodge Hotel) More images |
| Bondgate Methodist Church | Darlington | Methodist Chapel | 1812 | 28 April 1952 | NZ2866514605; 54°31′33″N 1°33′31″W | 1121254 | Upload Photo |
| Central School Annexe | Darlington | House | Early 19th century | 28 April 1952 | NZ2905314983; 54°31′45″N 1°33′09″W | 1242805 | Upload Photo |
| Church of Holy Trinity | Darlington | Chapel of Ease | 1836-38 | 28 April 1952 | NZ2831114818; 54°31′40″N 1°33′51″W | 1121226 | Church of Holy Trinity More images |
| Friends Meeting House | Darlington | Friends Meeting House | 1839-40 | 28 April 1952 | NZ2871114394; 54°31′26″N 1°33′29″W | 1121255 | Upload Photo |
| Goods Shed East South East of North Road Railway Station | Darlington | Goods Shed | 1833 | 6 September 1977 | NZ2899315629; 54°32′06″N 1°33′12″W | 1121262 | Goods Shed East South East of North Road Railway Station More images |
| Hillclose Farm House | Darlington | Farmhouse | 17th century | 28 April 1952 | NZ2665914682; 54°31′36″N 1°35′23″W | 1322954 | Upload Photo |
| North Road Railway Station (now Railway Museum) | Darlington | Museum | 1977 | 28 April 1952 | NZ2891015712; 54°32′09″N 1°33′17″W | 1322962 | North Road Railway Station (now Railway Museum) More images |
| Outbuilding to North East of Blackwell Grange | Darlington | Outbuilding | Third Quarter 18th century | 6 September 1977 | NZ2809513287; 54°30′51″N 1°34′03″W | 1160162 | Upload Photo |
| St Clare's Abbey Chapel | Darlington | Chapel | 1856 - 1857 | 18 August 2009 | NZ2728914497; 54°31′30″N 1°34′48″W | 1393424 | Upload Photo |
| 81 Bondgate | Darlington | House | Early 19th century | 28 April 1952 | NZ2870814709; 54°31′37″N 1°33′29″W | 1121316 | Upload Photo |
| 1–8 Harewood Grove | Darlington | Terrace | Early-mid 19th century | 28 April 1952 | NZ2831313845; 54°31′09″N 1°33′51″W | 1121296 | Upload Photo |
| 14 Horsemarket | Darlington | Town House | 18th century | 28 April 1952 | NZ2891714397; 54°31′27″N 1°33′17″W | 1121275 | Upload Photo |

== Hartlepool ==
| Name | Location | Type | Completed | Date designated | Grid ref. Geo-coordinates | Entry number | Image |
|---|---|---|---|---|---|---|---|
| Church of St. Peter | Elwick Village, Elwick, Hartlepool | Church | Late 12th century | 16 November 1967 | NZ4534632081; 54°40′54″N 1°17′54″W | 1139821 | Upload Photo |
| Church of St John the Baptist | Greatham, Hartlepool | Church | Late 12th century | 16 November 1967 | NZ4923127502; 54°38′25″N 1°14′19″W | 1263522 | Church of St John the Baptist More images |
| Boundary Wall to West of Church of St Mary Magdalene | Hart, Hartlepool | Boundary Wall | Medieval | 16 November 1967 | NZ4702735088; 54°42′31″N 1°16′18″W | 1249899 | Upload Photo |
| Numbers 2 and 3 (Duke of Cleveland's House) and East Extensions | Headland, Hartlepool | House | Late 17th century | 31 March 1949 | NZ5282633634; 54°41′42″N 1°10′55″W | 1250117 | Upload Photo |
| Christ Church | Hartlepool | Church | 1850-1854 | 10 November 1982 | NZ5106232586; 54°41′09″N 1°12′34″W | 1250112 | Christ Church More images |
| Church of All Saints | Hartlepool | Bench | 12th century | 24 March 1950 | NZ5088731992; 54°40′50″N 1°12′44″W | 1250534 | Church of All Saints More images |

== Stockton-on-Tees ==
The Borough crosses county Durham and North Yorkshire, Stockton-on-Tees town is in county Durham therefore buildings are listed here:

| Name | Location | Type | Completed | Date designated | Grid ref. Geo-coordinates | Entry number | Image |
|---|---|---|---|---|---|---|---|
| Ivy House | Cowpen Bewley | House | 17th century | 25 January 1951 | NZ4823524764; 54°36′57″N 1°15′17″W | 1139244 | Upload Photo |
| Phosphate Rock Silo No 15 at ICI Works | Billingham | Silo | 1928-1929 | 7 October 1992 | NZ4760821198; 54°35′01″N 1°15′54″W | 1115821 | Upload Photo |
| St Cuthbert's Vicarage | Billingham | House | 17th century | 21 June 1985 | NZ4574822363; 54°35′40″N 1°17′37″W | 1139272 | Upload Photo |
| Transporter Bridge | Port Clarence (crosses into Middlesbrough, North Yorkshire) | Transporter Bridge | 1911 | 21 June 1985 | NZ4999121297; 54°35′04″N 1°13′41″W | 1139267 | Transporter Bridge More images |
| The Hall (East House, West House and Second Floor Flat) | Egglescliffe | House | Mid to late 18th century | 16 November 1967 | NZ4222413238; 54°30′46″N 1°20′58″W | 1139255 | Upload Photo |
| Church of St John the Baptist | Elton | Church | 1841 | 16 November 1967 | NZ4018417372; 54°33′00″N 1°22′49″W | 1139261 | Church of St John the Baptist More images |
| Lion Bridge to East of Wynyard Hall | Grindon | Bridge | Early to mid 19th century | 16 November 1967 | NZ4221025781; 54°37′31″N 1°20′52″W | 1139222 | Upload Photo |
| Wellington Obelisk to South East of Wynyard Hall | Grindon | Obelisk | 1827 | 23 April 1952 | NZ4233325347; 54°37′17″N 1°20′45″W | 1329823 | Wellington Obelisk to South East of Wynyard Hall More images |
| Wynyard Hall | Grindon | House | 1822-41 | 23 April 1952 | NZ4204225757; 54°37′31″N 1°21′01″W | 1139221 | Wynyard Hall More images |
| Church of St Martin | Kirklevington | Church | 12th century | 23 June 1966 | NZ4317309860; 54°28′56″N 1°20′07″W | 1329828 | Church of St Martin More images |
| Church of St Mary | Longnewton | Church | 1856-1857 | 16 November 1967 | NZ3827416487; 54°32′32″N 1°24′36″W | 1139238 | Church of St Mary More images |
| Manor House | Longnewton | Manor House | 18th century | 16 November 1967 | NZ3824516443; 54°32′31″N 1°24′37″W | 1329830 | Upload Photo |
| Church of St Luke | Thornaby | Parish Church | 1904 | 21 June 1985 | NZ4579817928; 54°33′16″N 1°17′36″W | 1329463 | Church of St Luke More images |
| Old Church of St Peter | Thornaby | Church | 12th century | 19 January 1951 | NZ4505516438; 54°32′28″N 1°18′18″W | 1139917 | Old Church of St Peter More images |
| The Rectory | Wolviston | House | Pre 1780 | 25 January 1951 | NZ4508825525; 54°37′22″N 1°18′12″W | 1329470 | Upload Photo |
| Church of St Mary Magdalene | Yarm | Church | Norman | 23 June 1966 | NZ4163312914; 54°30′35″N 1°21′31″W | 1054686 | Church of St Mary Magdalene More images |
| The Ketton Ox Public House | Yarm | House | Pre 1767 | 5 May 1952 | NZ4186012998; 54°30′38″N 1°21′18″W | 1139901 | The Ketton Ox Public House |
| Yarm Bridge | Eaglescliffe and Yarm | Bridge | c. 1400 | 16 November 1967 | NZ4180213139; 54°30′43″N 1°21′21″W | 1105658 | Yarm Bridge More images |
| 10 and 12 High Street | Yarm | House | Early 18th century | 5 May 1952 | NZ4195712707; 54°30′29″N 1°21′13″W | 1139936 | Upload Photo |
| 14 High Street | Yarm | House | Early 18th century | 5 May 1952 | NZ4195712720; 54°30′29″N 1°21′13″W | 1049109 | Upload Photo |
| 124 High Street | Yarm | House | Mid 18th century | 5 May 1952 | NZ4181313080; 54°30′41″N 1°21′21″W | 1139904 | Upload Photo |
| Church of St Michael and All Angels | Stockton-on-Tees | Church | 1913 | 19 January 1951 | NZ4472320946; 54°34′54″N 1°18′34″W | 1329478 | Upload Photo |
| Church of St Peter | Stockton-on-Tees | Church | 1880-1881 | 19 January 1951 | NZ4386118186; 54°33′25″N 1°19′24″W | 1139916 | Church of St Peter More images |
| Church of the Holy Trinity | Stockton-on-Tees | Church | 1837-1838 | 19 January 1951 | NZ4438918552; 54°33′37″N 1°18′54″W | 1329480 | Church of the Holy Trinity More images |
| Columbia House | Stockton-on-Tees | House | Mid to late 18th century | 19 January 1951 | NZ4477819368; 54°34′03″N 1°18′32″W | 1329447 | Columbia House More images |
| Friends Meeting House | Stockton-on-Tees | Meeting House | 1876 | 19 January 1951 | NZ4431819005; 54°33′52″N 1°18′58″W | 1356201 | Upload Photo |
| Gloucester House | Stockton-on-Tees | House | Mid 18th century | 19 January 1951 | NZ4474119351; 54°34′03″N 1°18′34″W | 1084341 | Gloucester House |
| The Manor House | Hartburn | House | 17th century | 19 January 1951 | NZ4290017940; 54°33′18″N 1°20′18″W | 1325975 | Upload Photo |
| The Market Cross | Stockton-on-Tees | Market Cross | 1768 | 19 January 1951 | NZ4452718955; 54°33′50″N 1°18′46″W | 1139976 | The Market Cross More images |
| Town Hall | Stockton-on-Tees | Town Hall | Post 1744 | 19 January 1951 | NZ4452618979; 54°33′51″N 1°18′46″W | 1139975 | Town Hall More images |
| War Memorial | Stockton-on-Tees | Sarcophagus | 1923 | 19 January 1951 | NZ4454719231; 54°33′59″N 1°18′45″W | 1139979 | War Memorial More images |
| 108 High Street | Stockton-on-Tees | House | Mid 18th century | 19 January 1951 | NZ4448618881; 54°33′48″N 1°18′49″W | 1101477 | Upload Photo |
| 48 Bridge Road | Stockton-on-Tees | House | 1825 | 19 January 1951 | NZ4469518381; 54°33′31″N 1°18′37″W | 1139963 | Upload Photo |
| 74 and 76 Church Road | Stockton-on-Tees | House | Mid to late 18th century | 19 January 1951 | NZ4477019350; 54°34′03″N 1°18′33″W | 1139966 | 74 and 76 Church Road |
| 80 Church Road | Stockton-on-Tees | House | Mid to late 18th century | 21 June 1985 | NZ4479519353; 54°34′03″N 1°18′31″W | 1338865 | 80 Church Road |
| 9 Finkle Street | Stockton-on-Tees | House | 17th century | 19 January 1951 | NZ4460818982; 54°33′51″N 1°18′42″W | 1356182 | 9 Finkle Street |
| 32 Dovecot Street | Stockton-on-Tees | House | Early to mid | 19 January 1951 | NZ4442019022; 54°33′52″N 1°18′52″W | 1329448 | Upload Photo |

== See also ==
- Grade I listed buildings in County Durham
- Category:Grade II* listed buildings in County Durham
