= Langton, County Durham =

Village in County Durham, England

Coordinates: 54.570°N 1.733°W

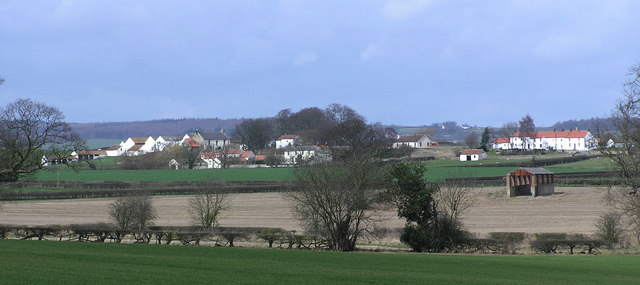
The village in 2006

Langton is a village and civil parish in County Durham, in England. It is situated to the west of Darlington, near Headlam and Ingleton. The population of the civil parish taken at the 2011 Census was less than 100.
