= Henry Witham =

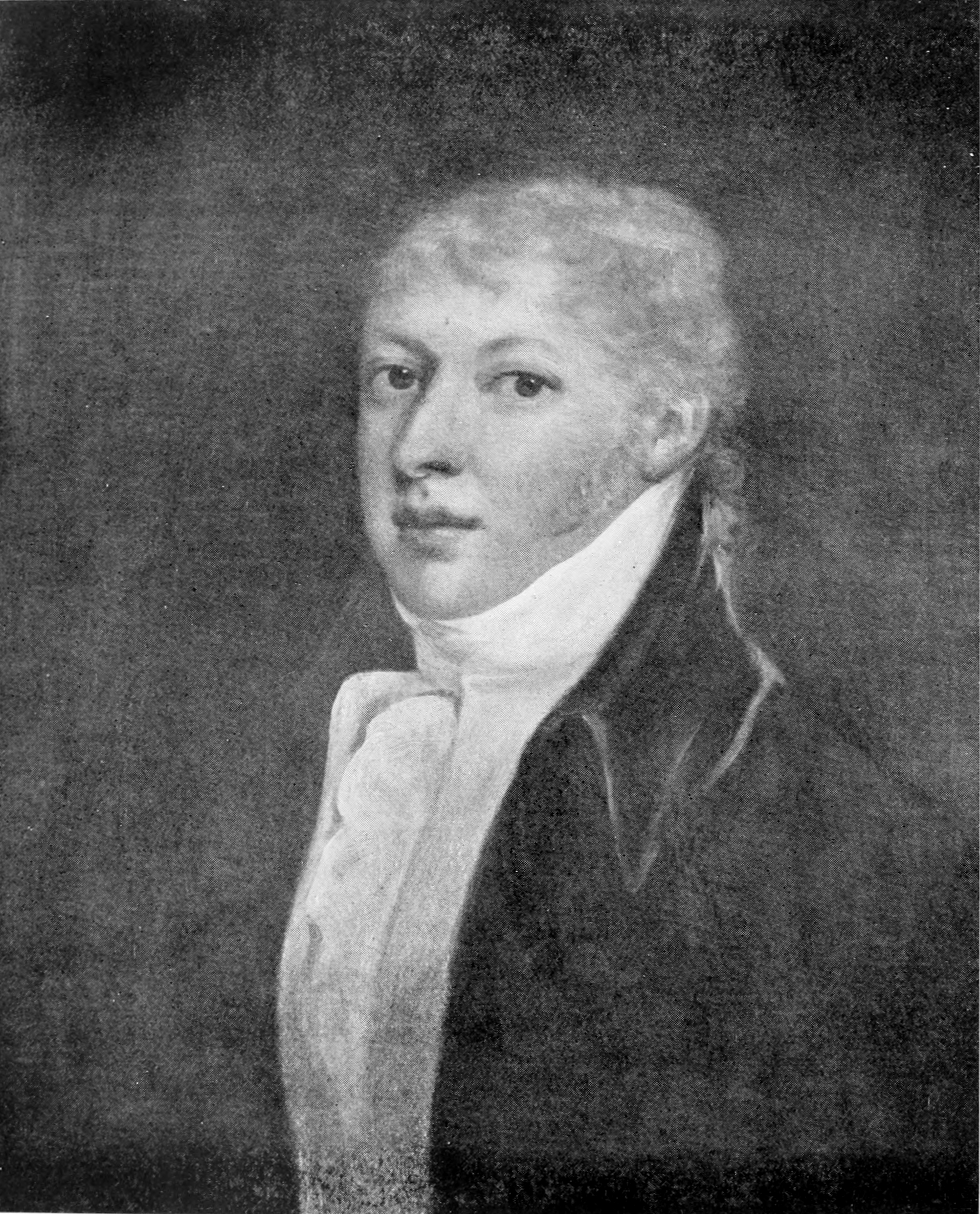

Henry Thomas Maire Witham FRSE FGS (9 June 1779–1844) was a British landowner remembered as an amateur palaeontologist and mineralogist.

He was an early researcher into the internal structure of fossil plants.

== Life ==
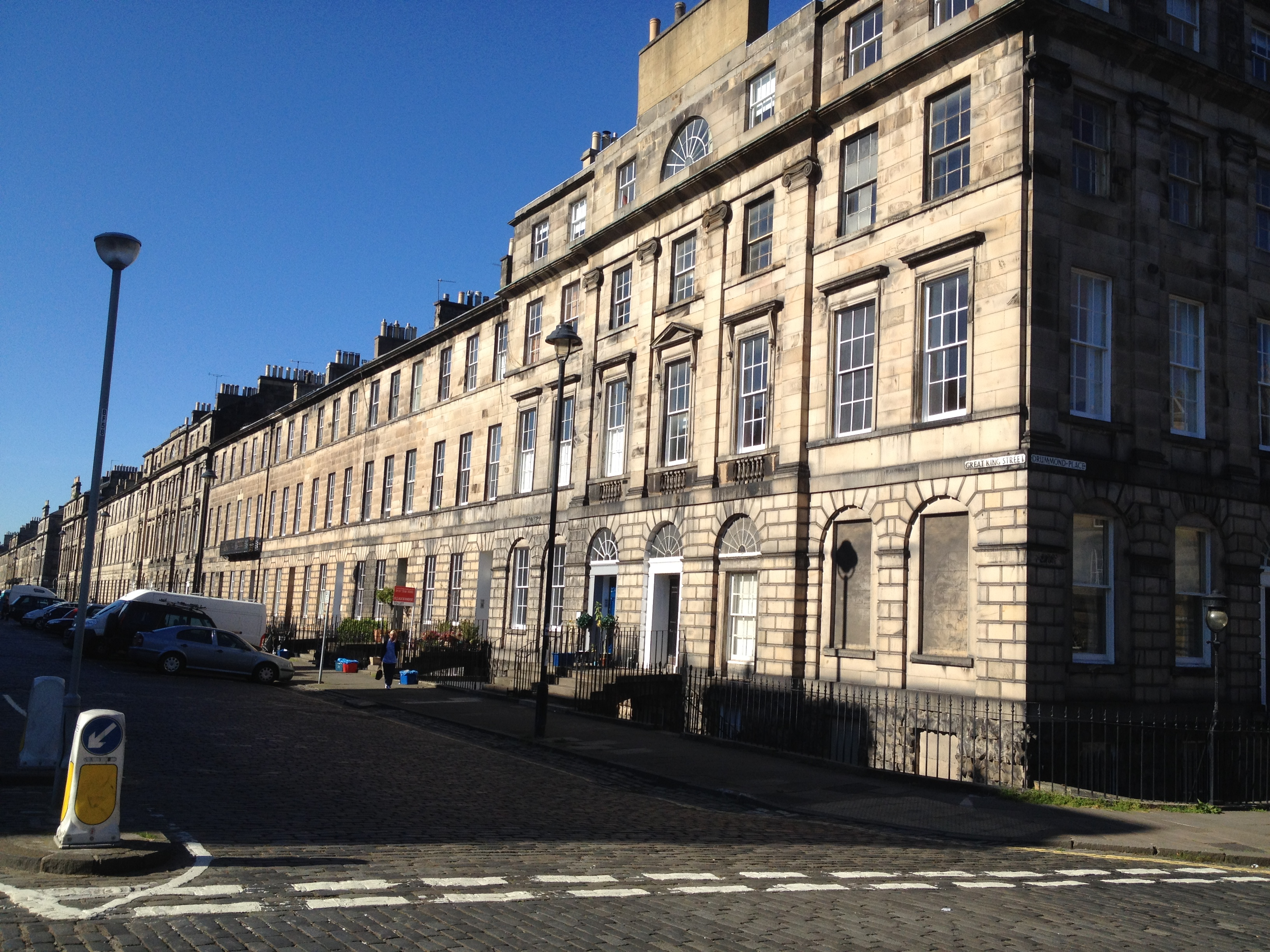
Great King Street 2-42, Edinburgh

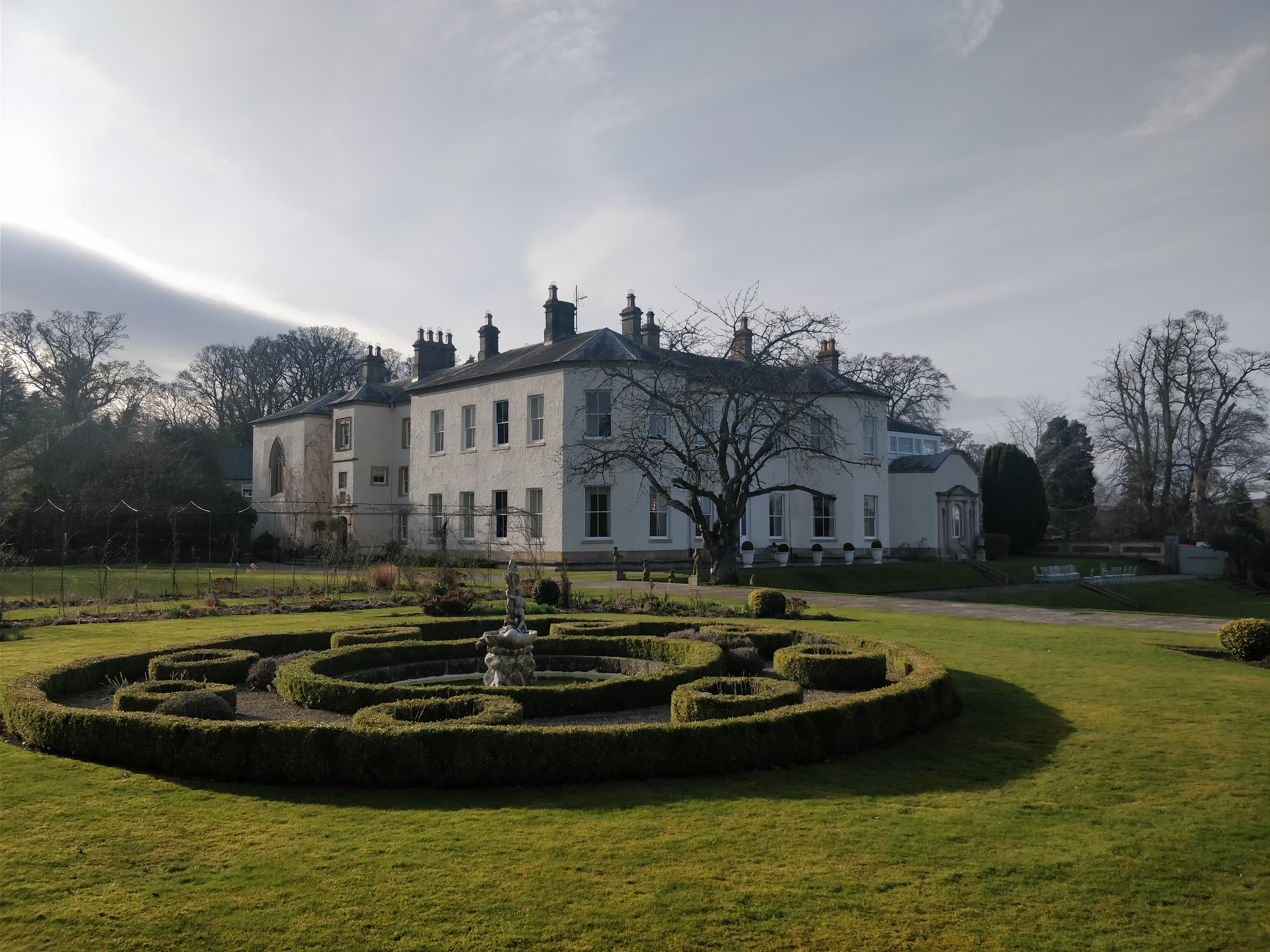
Lartington Hall

He was born Henry Silvertop, the son of John Silvertop of Minsteracres in Northumberland. His mother was Catherine Lawson of Brough.

He was a compulsive gambler and ran up debts of £105,000 (a huge sum in the 1820s) and was forced to sell off much of his property to settle his debts.

From 1826 to 1832, he lived in Edinburgh at 14 Great King Street. During his time in Edinburgh (in 1827), he was elected a Fellow of the Royal Society of Edinburgh, his proposer being Thomas Allan.

Though having no botanical training, he applied William Nicol's method of examining fossils and rocks under the microscope by slicing them into thin sections. Nicol's first published account of this process is contained in Witham's 1831 publication, Observations of Fossil Vegetables. Witham's findings were also published in his 1833 book The Internal Structure of Fossil Vegetables found in the Carboniferous and Oolitic deposits of Great Britain, illustrated by William MacGillivray.

He worked strenuously for the Mechanics Institute, which provided education for the working classes and the relief of the sick poor.

He was a Fellow of the Geological Society of London and of the Wernerian Natural History Society of Edinburgh.

He died at his home at Lartington Hall on 28 November 1844.

== Family ==
In 1800, he married Eliza Witham, daughter of Thomas Witham, Esq., of Headlam, in County Durham, and niece and heiress of William Witham, esq., of Cliffe, in Richmondshire, North Yorkshire, and thus inherited the Witham name and coat of arms.

Their son Henry John Silvertop (b.1802) kept his father's original surname.

The family were all Roman Catholic.

== Publications ==
- The Internal Structure of Fossil Vegetables (1833)

== See also ==
- The Birds of America - sale in 2010 of a copy of the book presented to Witham's wife
