= Ingleton, County Durham =

Village and civil parish in County Durham, England

Coordinates: 54.5787°N 1.7300°W

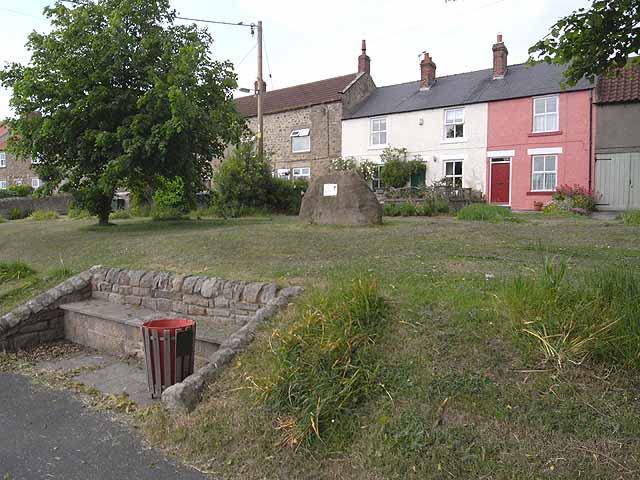
Cottages and Millennium Stone at Ingleton

Ingleton is a village and civil parish in County Durham, England. The population of the parish (which includes Headlam and Langton) as taken at the 2011 census was 420. It is situated about eight miles to the west of Darlington, and a short distance from the villages of Langton, Hilton and Killerby. The Church of St John the Evangelist in Ingleton was built in 1843 by Ignatius Bonomi and J.A. Cory., and is a Grade II listed building.
