= Grade II* listed buildings in North Yorkshire =

North Yorkshire shown within England

The county of North Yorkshire is divided into 4 districts. The districts of North Yorkshire are namesake districts, the City of York, Redcar and Cleveland, Middlesbrough, and parts are in the Borough of Stockton-on-Tees administered from Stockton, County Durham.

As there are over 750 Grade II* listed buildings in the county, they have been split into separate lists for each district.

- Grade II* listed buildings in North Yorkshire (district)
  - Grade II* listed churches in North Yorkshire (district)
- Grade II* listed buildings in the City of York
- Grade II* listed buildings in Redcar and Cleveland
- Grade II* listed buildings in Middlesbrough (borough)
- Grade II* listed buildings in County Durham#Stockton-on-Tees (for south of the Stockton borough)

== See also ==
- Grade I listed buildings in North Yorkshire
