= Rules (restaurant) =

Coordinates: 51.5108°N 0.1232°W

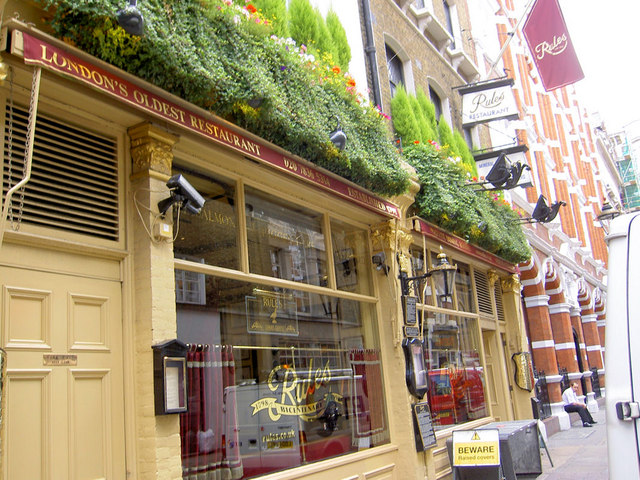
- Interactive map of Rules

Restaurant information
- Established: 1798
- Owners: Ricky McMenemy (business); National Trust (building)
- Previous owner: John Mayhew
- Food type: British cuisine
- Location: 34-35 Maiden Lane, London, United Kingdom
- Website: rules.co.uk

Rules is a restaurant on Maiden Lane in Covent Garden, London, England. It was founded in 1798 by Thomas Rule and describes itself as London's oldest restaurant. In 2026, the building became a National Trust property.

== History ==
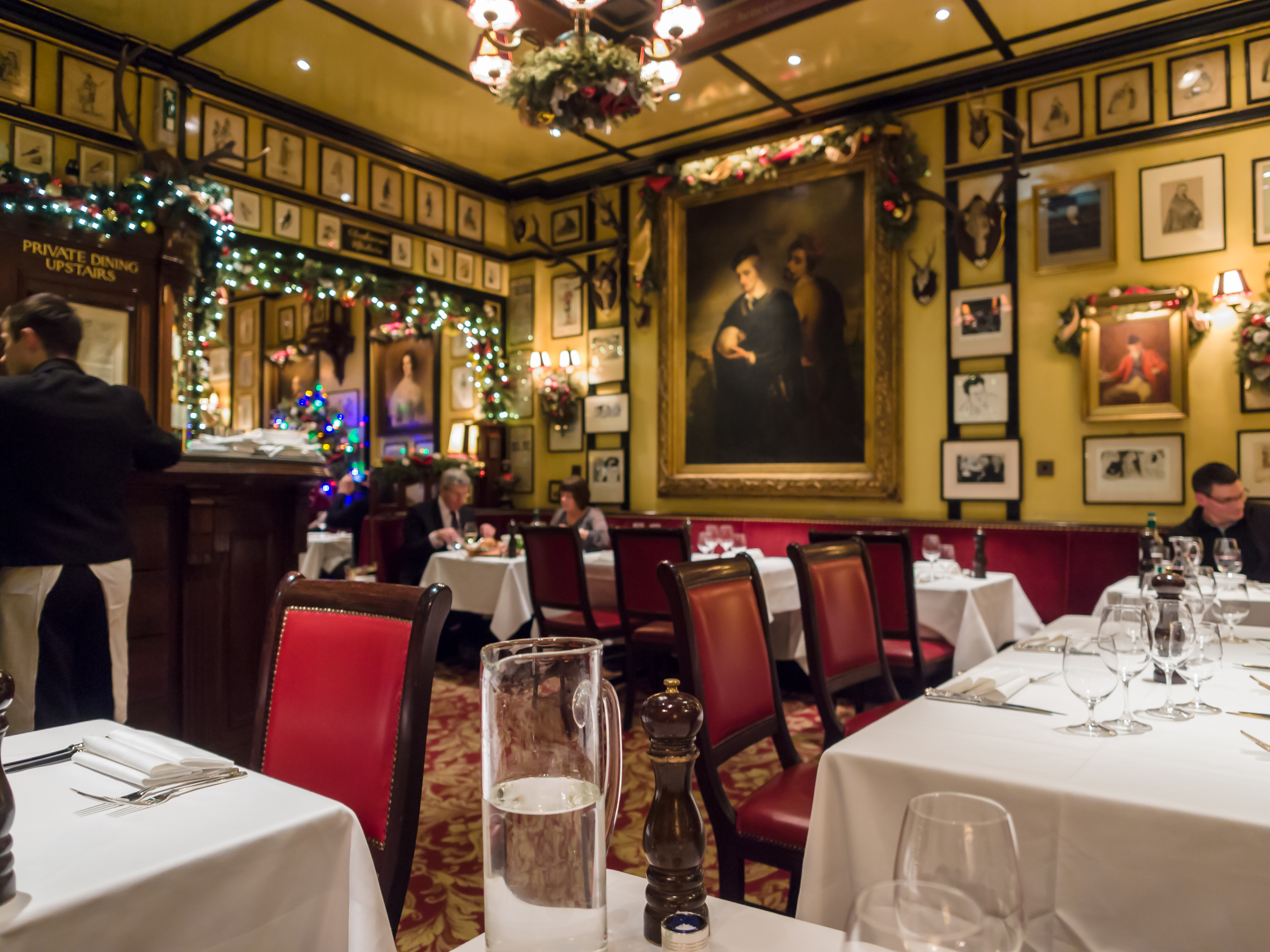
View of the interior

Rules was opened by Thomas Rule in 1798, primarily as an oyster bar but served, and continues to serve, traditional British cuisine. Rules specialises in game, much of which is supplied by the Lartington Hall estate in Teesdale, owned by former Rules owner John Mayhew.

The restaurant stayed in the Rule family until World War I, when Charles Rule swapped businesses with Thomas Bell. Bell's daughter subsequently sold the restaurant to John Mayhew in 1984. In 2022, the business was sold by Mayhew to Ricky McMenemy, who had worked at the restaurant for over 35 years, with Mayhew retaining the freehold. Rules has been frequented by Henry Irving and Laurence Olivier, amongst others.

The restaurant has featured in novels by Graham Greene, Dick Francis, Dorothy L. Sayers and Evelyn Waugh. John Betjeman complained to the Greater London Council in 1971 when the restaurant was under threat from demolition.

The then-head chef of Rules, Rory Kennedy, was featured in the Japanese cooking series Iron Chef, where he challenged Hiroyuki Sakai. They finished in a draw for the theme of European rabbit. A tiebreaker was held with the theme of pigeon, which Sakai won. Later in the year, Kennedy died after falling from a flight of stairs.

In 2026, the owner, John Mayhew, donated the freehold of the building to the National Trust as an inalienable gift, meaning it could not be sold on. The restaurant business had previously been bought by its manager, Ricky McMenemy, who became a tenant of the trust.
