= Maiden Lane, Covent Garden =

Street in Covent Garden, London

Coordinates: 51.5107°N 0.1229°W

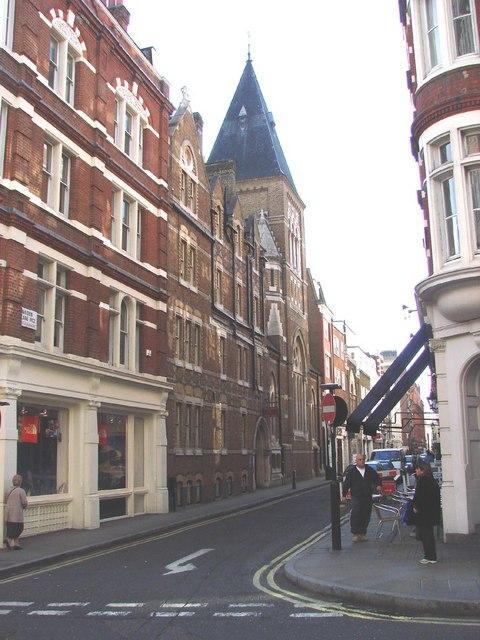
Maiden Lane showing Corpus Christi Roman Catholic Church.

Maiden Lane is a street in Covent Garden, London, that runs from Bedford Street in the west to Southampton Street in the east. The painter J. M. W. Turner was born on this street in 1775.

== History ==
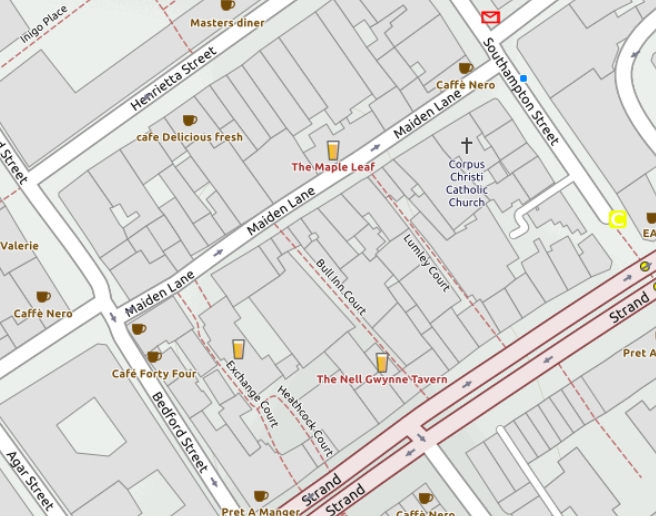
The immediate vicinity of Maiden Lane.

The street is based on an ancient track that ran through the Convent Garden to St Martin's Lane. According to Isaac D'Israeli the street was named after a statue of the Virgin Mary that once stood in the street. It was built up from 1631 to 1728. In 1727–28 Voltaire stayed at the White Wig Inn while he was exiled from Paris. The painter J.M.W. Turner was born above his father's barber's shop at number 21 in 1775.

The British Socialist Party established their offices at 21a Maiden Lane. These premises were taken over by the Communist Party of Great Britain during their first year of existence.

== Buildings ==
Corpus Christi Roman Catholic Church is located in the street. The restaurant Rules is at No. 34.

Europe's first recording studio was opened here in 1898.

== See also ==
- Maiden Lane Estate, King's Cross.
- York Way, King's Cross. Formerly known as Mayde Lane and Maiden Lane.
