= Old Hall, Hurworth-on-Tees =

House in Hurworth-on-Tees, County Durham, England

Coordinates: 54°29′07″N 1°31′48″W

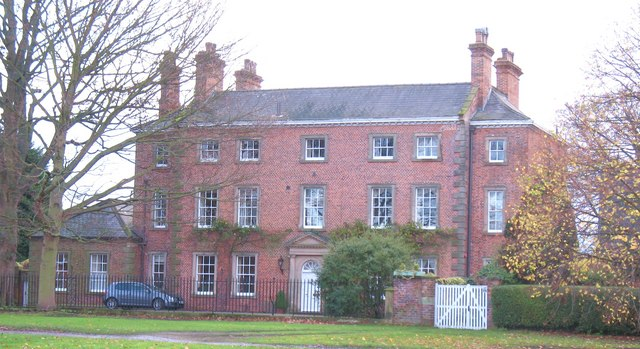
Hurworth Old Hall in 2009.

The Old Hall is situated on Hurworth Green, in the village of Hurworth-on-Tees in County Durham, England. It is number 50 on The Green. Built in the mid-18th century, with 19th century modifications and additions, the house of red brick and has three storeys and a basement. There is a slate roof with five brick chimneys. A single-story pavilion is on the left. The front and rear doors have a fanlight and are under Roman Ionic pediments supported by columns. A little way south from the back garden lies the River Tees. An iron fence separates its grounds from the green. A drive runs from behind its gates to the main road, cutting through the green. The house is a Grade II* Listed Building and was listed on 6 January 1952.
