= Bishop Auckland Town Hall =

Municipal building in Bishop Auckland, County Durham, England

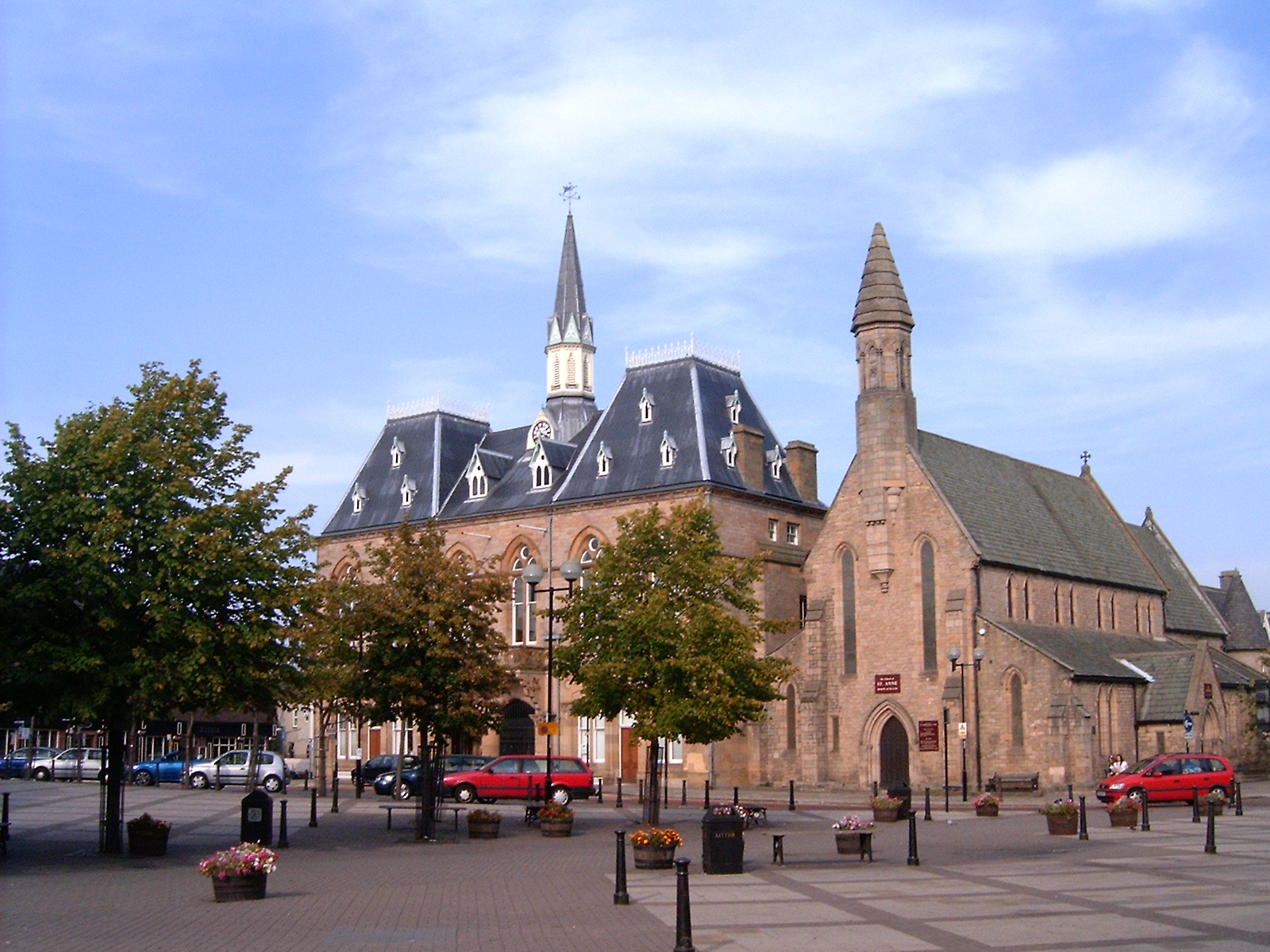
- Bishop Auckland Town Hall

- Shown in County Durham
- 54.6659°N 1.6735°W
- Location: Market Place, Bishop Auckland

History
- Built: 1862

Site notes
- Architect: John Philpott Jones
- Architectural style: Gothic Revival style
- Website: www.bishopaucklandtownhall.org.uk

Listed Building – Grade II*
- Designated: 20 September 1972
- Reference no.: 1297550

Bishop Auckland Town Hall is a municipal facility in the Market Place, Bishop Auckland, Co Durham, England. It is a Grade II* listed building.

== History ==
The building, which was designed by John Philpott Jones in the Gothic Revival style for the Bishop Auckland Town Hall and Market Company, was financed by private issue of shares and officially opened on 28 October 1862. When it opened facilities included a large lecture hall capable of accommodating 800 people and a temperance hotel. The building held a prominent position in the town and dominated the area with its strong mansard pavilions, spires and associated ironwork. The mansard pavilions were an unusual feature imported from France which were copied a few years later by Bellamy and Hardy in their design for Retford Town Hall.

The building was acquired by the local board of health in 1888 and it became the headquarters of Bishop Auckland Urban District council in 1894. Sir Edward Elgar visited the building on 2 December 1919 and conducted the Leeds Symphony Orchestra playing a series of pieces of his own work.

After Bishop Auckland Urban District Council was abolished in 1974, the building was abandoned and then condemned for demolition in the 1980s; however, after a local campaign to save the building, it was fully restored in the early 1990s. The works included the conversion of the main assembly hall into a facility known as the Eden Theatre to commemorate a previous theatre of that name in Newgate Street which had been demolished in 1974. The changes also introduced a new public library, an art gallery, a tourist information centre and a café. The complex was officially re-opened in September 1993 and the restoration in the complex was recognised with a Civic Trust Award in 1995.

The art gallery went on to hold three exhibitions for mining artist Tom Lamb. The first was held in 1999 for his "Fading Memories" exhibition, then in 2004 for Lamb's "The Footprints Of My Years" exhibition and in 2008 the last exhibition called "My Mining Days" was held.

The building closed for a further refurbishment involving a new layout to the art gallery and expected to cost £1.9 million in September 2019.
