= Lartington Hall =

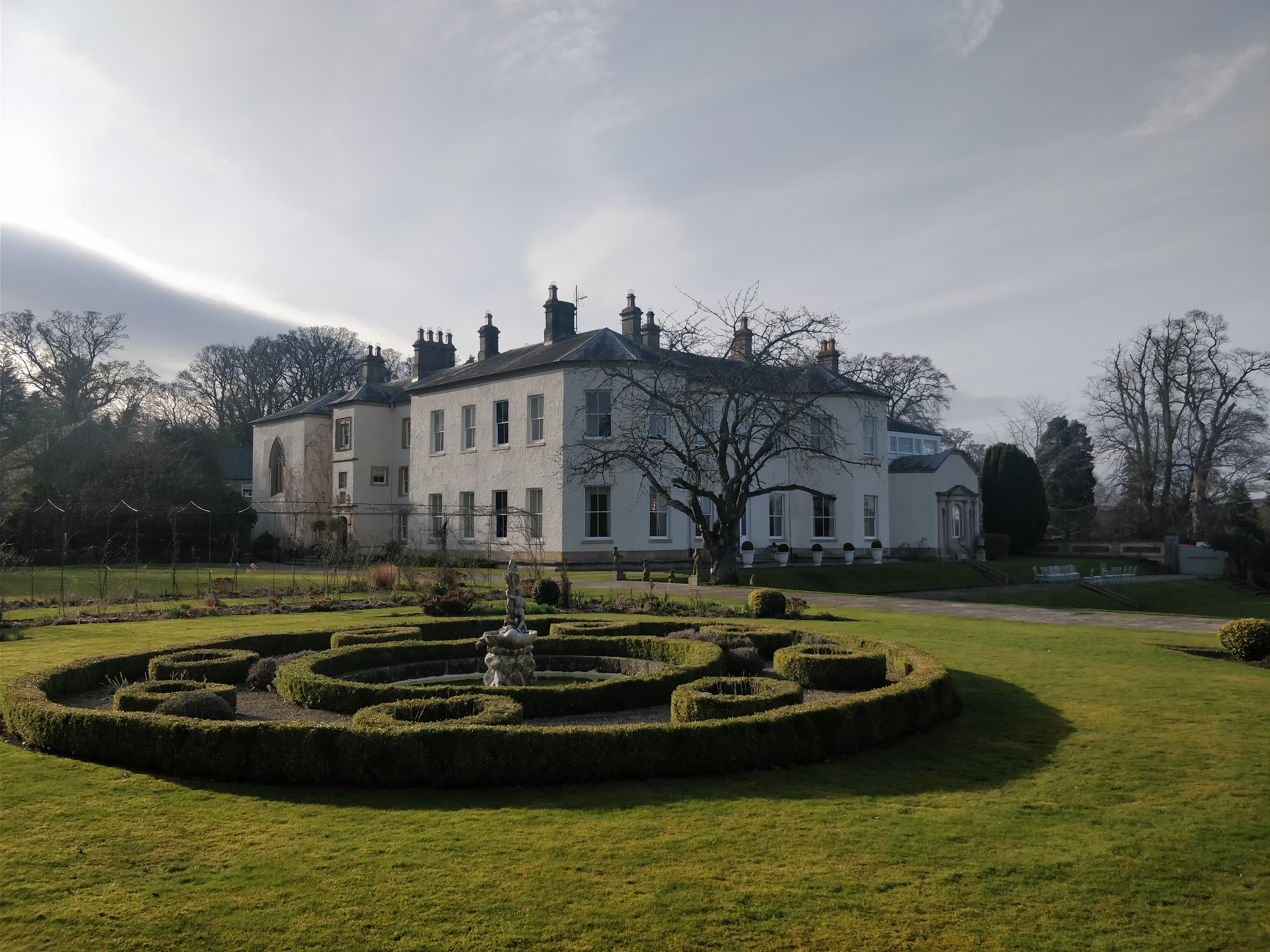
- Hall from the south east, showing from left to right c.1800 chapel, original 17th-century hall frontage, c.1800 east wing, and 1836 ballroom.

- Location within County Durham

General information
- Location: County Durham, England
- Coordinates: 54.555°N 1.968°W

Website
- https://www.lartington-hall.com/

Lartington Hall is a 17th-century country house, at Lartington, Teesdale, County Durham, England. It is a Grade II* listed building.

== Architecture ==
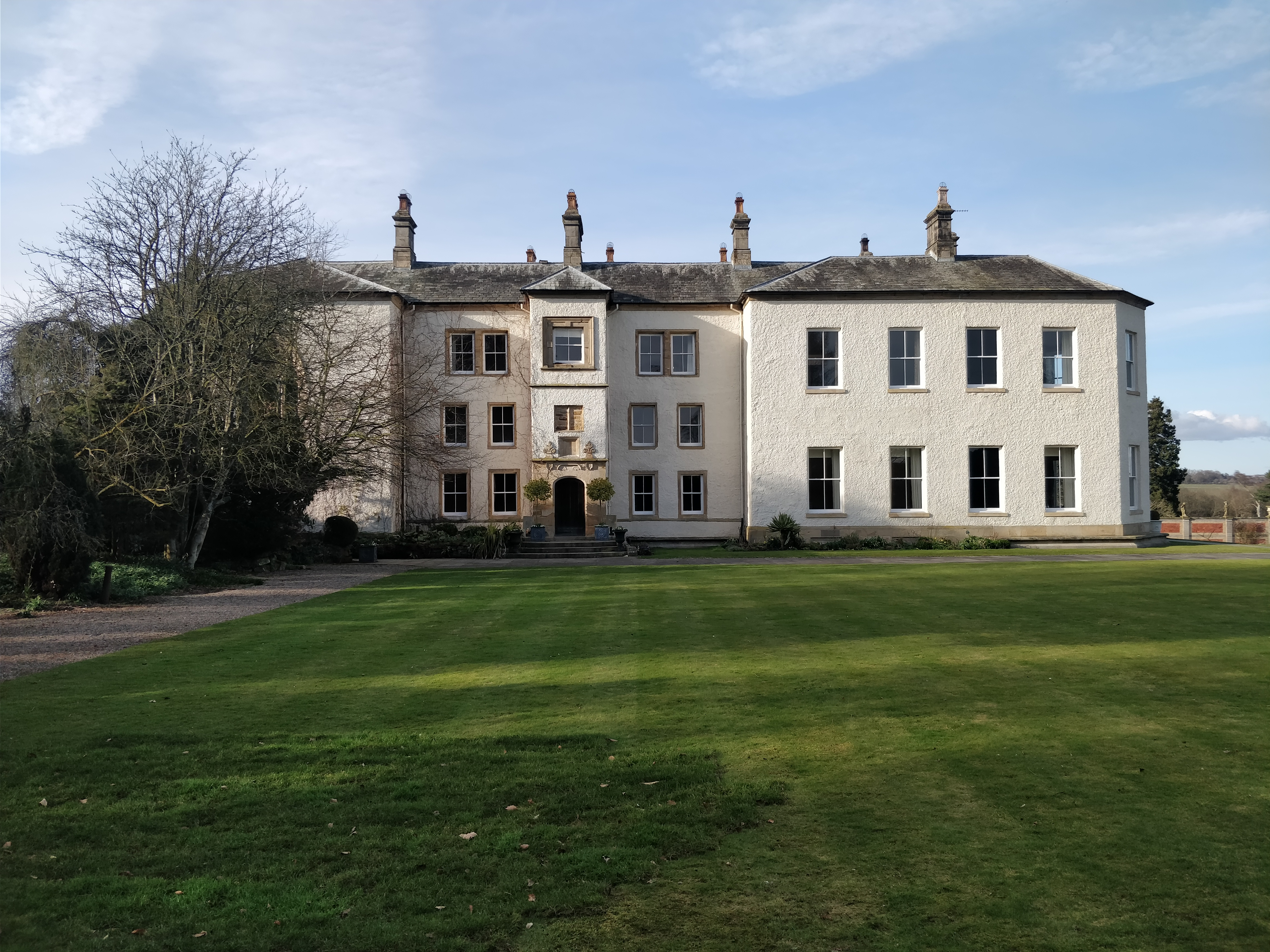
South front of the building, with the original 17th century frontage flanked by c.1800 additions

The earliest part of the house, built for the Appleby family, is the three-storey four-bayed central block and projecting three-storey porch, which dates from about 1635. The west wing and chapel dedicated to St Lawrence were added in about 1800, and an east wing in the early 19th century, to which was added a ballroom in 1836 possibly to a design by Ignatius Bonomi. A curved porte-cochère on the north side, and adjoining vestibule and corridor, were added in 1861-5 by Joseph Hansom.

== History ==
The Roman Catholic family of Maire acquired the manor of Lartington by marriage in 1654. It passed to the Lawson family when Sir Henry Lawson Bt (d. 1834) of Brough Hall married Anna Anastasia, the Maire heiress. Their grandson Henry Thomas Maire Silvertop, who inherited the estate, married Eliza Witham and changed his surname to Witham. As Henry Witham he was High Sheriff of Durham in 1844.

When the Hall was Grade II* listed in 1986, the report added specifics, stating that in the 12th Century, the property had been owned by Robert de Lascelles. After several later sales, it was acquired in 1639 by "Francis Appleby and passed through marriage to the Maire family". The principal building "probably originated in the late C17, though there may have been an earlier building on the site". The report also indicates that additions were made in the late 18th century "including a chapel, and of the early C19, including a ballroom (formerly museum) of c 1836".

Henry Witham's fourth son, the Right Reverend Monsignor Thomas Edward Witham, lived in the Hall from 1847 until his death. Witham had arranged to add a porte-cochere. In 1887, the property was inherited by his grandnephew Francis Silvertop of Minsteracres. This family sold it in 1910 and the new owner sold it again after WW I to a wealthy American, Norman Field. During WW II, the Hall was used by the Red Cross as a hospital for injured soldiers; Army tanks caused damage to the building and the grounds. Afterwards, the Field family again occupied it until 1973, and allowed it to deteriorate. The Hall then stood empty and neglected for some years, until former airline pilot Robin Rackham took a 30 year lease. A restoration project by Rackham was completed with the assistance of the Historic Buildings Council. It commenced in 1980, beginning with extensive works to the roof and moving on to the ballroom and corridor. To make money, Rackham turned the chapel into a squash court and the ballroom into a recording studio.

As of 1998 it was owned by John Mayhew, and the estate supplied game to his London restaurant, Rules. In 2010 it was acquired by Shona and John Harper-Wilkes, who turned it into a wedding venue. The more extensive "restoration, modernisation and redecoration" by the Harper-Wilkes ran from 2011 until 2015.

== Current use ==
Lartington Hall operates as a wedding venue under ownership of The Apartment Group, a wedding venue operator in North East England. The Grade II* listed building, dating to the 17th century and set within 72 acres of parkland, hosts civil ceremonies and receptions.
