= Bolam, County Durham =

Village in County Durham, England

Coordinates: 54°35′51″N 1°41′43″W

Bolam
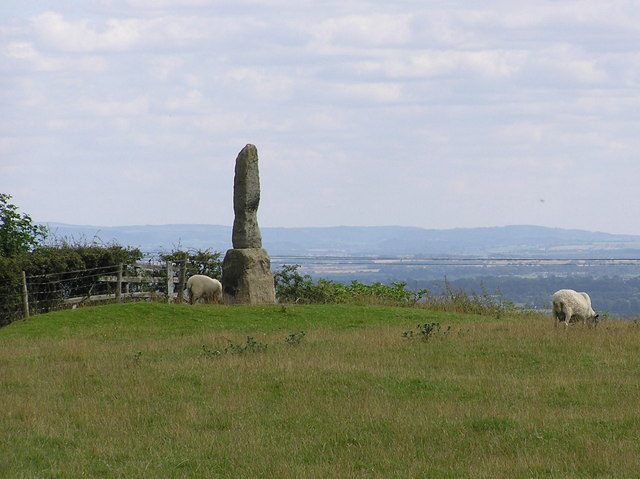
- Legs Cross on Dere Street overlooks Bolam

- Location within County Durham
- Population: 84 (2021 census)
- Civil parish: Bolam
- Unitary authority: County Durham
- Ceremonial county: Durham
- Region: North East
- Country: England
- Sovereign state: United Kingdom
- Police: Durham
- Fire: County Durham and Darlington
- Ambulance: North East

Bolam is a small village located in County Durham, England. The parish population (including Hilton and Morton Tinmouth) at the 2011 census was 209, in 2021 the parish of Bolam alone had 84. It is situated a few miles to the north-west of Darlington.

In 2009 Npower Renewables identified an area of land to the north-west of Bolam as a possible site for the location of seven wind turbines, each up to 125 metres tall.

== Etymology ==
The name Bolam was first recorded as Bolum in c. 1155. It may derive from Old English bol ("high swell of land") + ham ("homstead"). Or else, it may mean "at the tree trunks"; from Old English bola, Old Norse bolr ("tree-trunk, log, plank").
