= Apollo Pavilion =

Sculpture in Peterlee, County Durham, England

Coordinates: 54°45′00″N 1°20′44″W

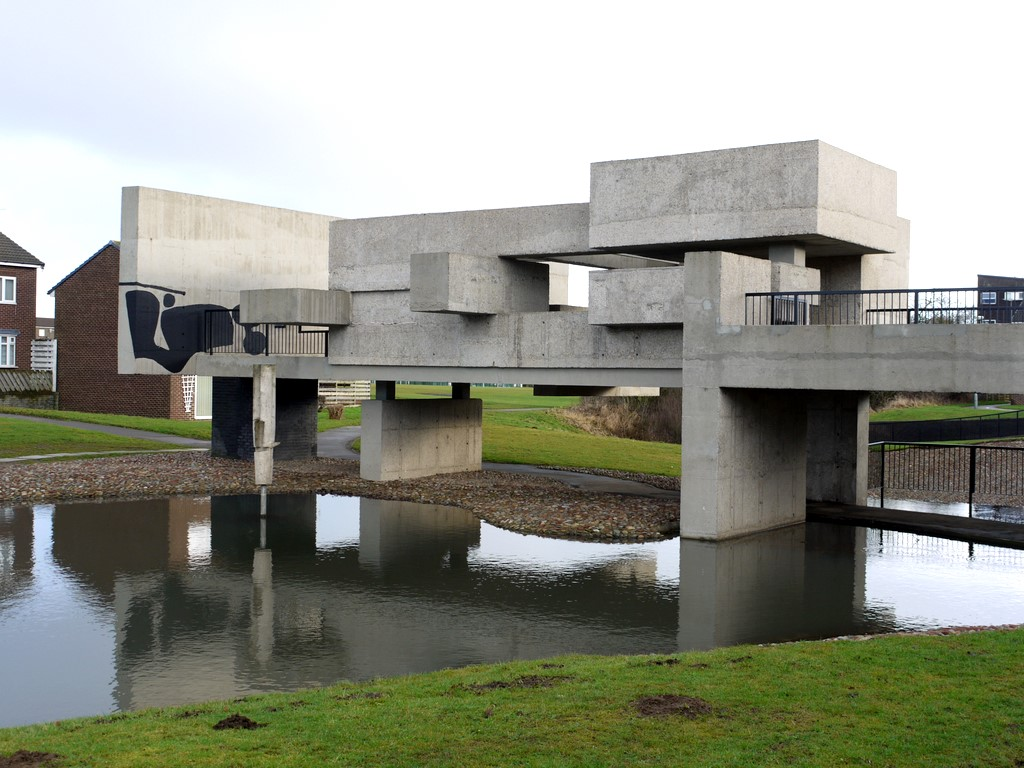
- Artist: Victor Pasmore

The Apollo Pavilion, also known as the Pasmore Pavilion, is a work of public art in the new town of Peterlee in County Durham in the North East of England. Designed by British artist and architect Victor Pasmore, it was completed in 1969.

In December 2011, English Heritage gave the Pavilion a Grade-II* listing.

== Design and construction ==
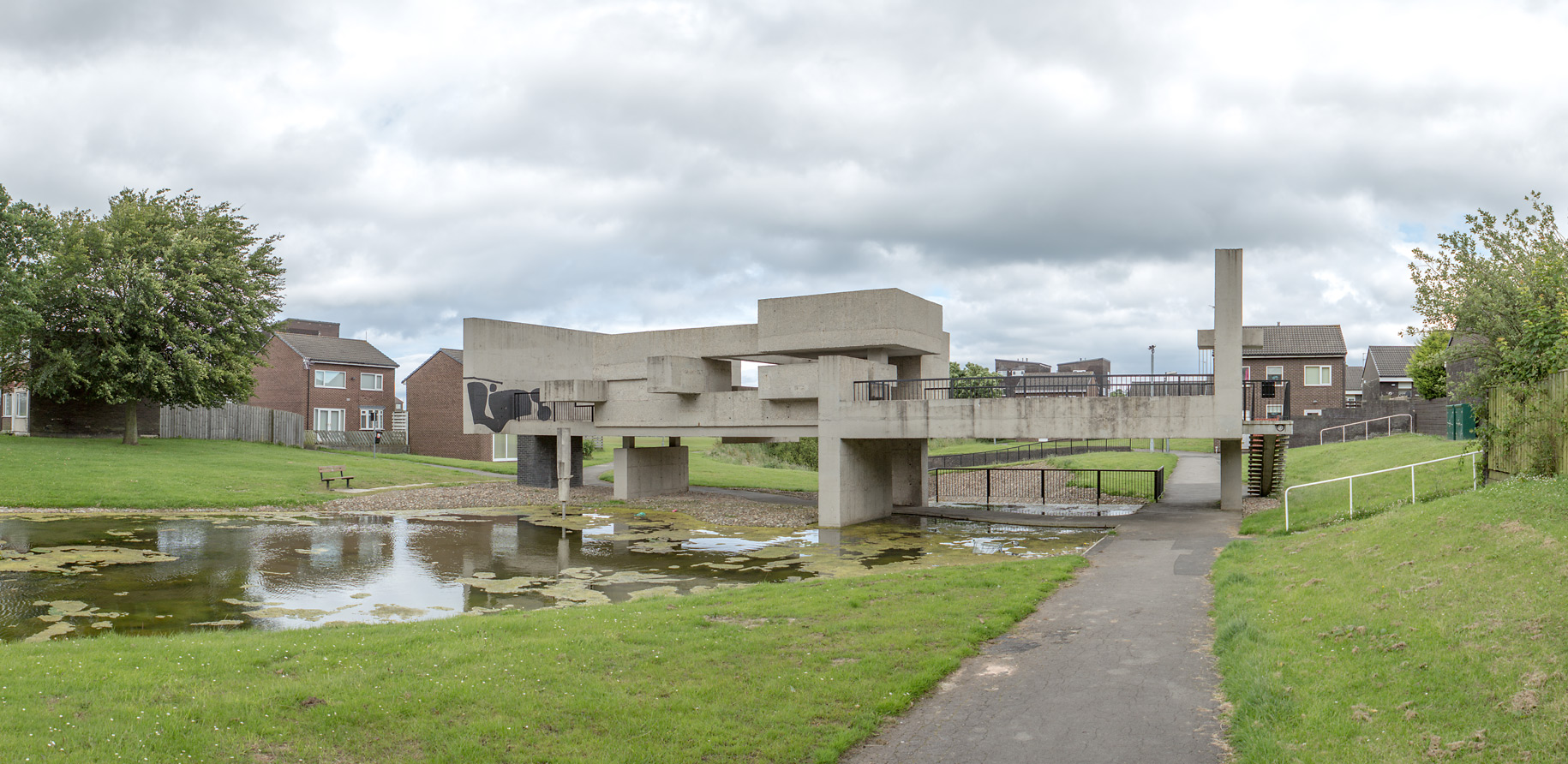
Looking east towards the Apollo Pavilion from a footpath which runs beside the lake that runs through the Pavilion

Peterlee was originally designed by Berthold Lubetkin in 1940. However, his hope to develop high rises were considered "too risky," due to the mining subsidence in the area.

In 1955, Victor Pasmore was appointed Consulting Director of Architectural Design of the Peterlee development corporation. He chose to design the town around a central abstract artwork and pavilion, eventually naming it the Apollo Pavilion as a reference to the optimism of the Apollo Space Program.

The Pavilion is made of reinforced concrete that was cast in situ. The design consists of large geometric planes of white concrete, the only decoration being two oval murals. The structure spans a small lake that frames a large geometric statue by Pasmore; in its original form, the Pavilion provided a pedestrian link between the two halves of the estate.

Victor Pasmore described it as "... an architecture and sculpture of purely abstract form through which to walk, in which to linger and on which to play, a free and anonymous monument which, because of its independence, can lift the activity and psychology of an urban housing community on to a universal plane."

The work remains a rare UK example of a large-scale experiment in the synthesis of art and architecture. "It stands today," says Richard Cork, "as a fascinating example of how contemporary artists can translate their concerns into wholly architectural terms, and how even the restricted budget of a new town is able, given the necessary degree of commitment, to yield funding for a purely imaginative feat."

Over time, the pavilion became neglected, with local youths frequently tagging it with graffiti and the stair axis being blocked off. Pasmore approved of graffiti when he visited the pavilion in 1982, stating that he considered it to be "a dialogue with that very community who had ironically rejected it and were calling for its demolition."

== Reception ==
The Pavilion was immediately the focus of local complaint, and a councillor, Joan Maslin, mounted a campaign against the work. It became a popular hangout for local youths and was subject to graffiti and vandalism. When the Peterlee Development Corporation (which commissioned the £33,000 work) was disbanded, the local council refused responsibility for cleaning and repair. As a result, the concrete turned grey and began to decay.

In 1982, Victor Pasmore met with residents during a public meeting at the pavilion. Pasmore suggested that, if anything, the graffiti had humanised the piece, and suggested that the solution would not be to remove the piece, but rather, the disruptive families that were abusing it. It was agreed that the stair access would be blocked off and the structure used for planting.

== Restoration ==
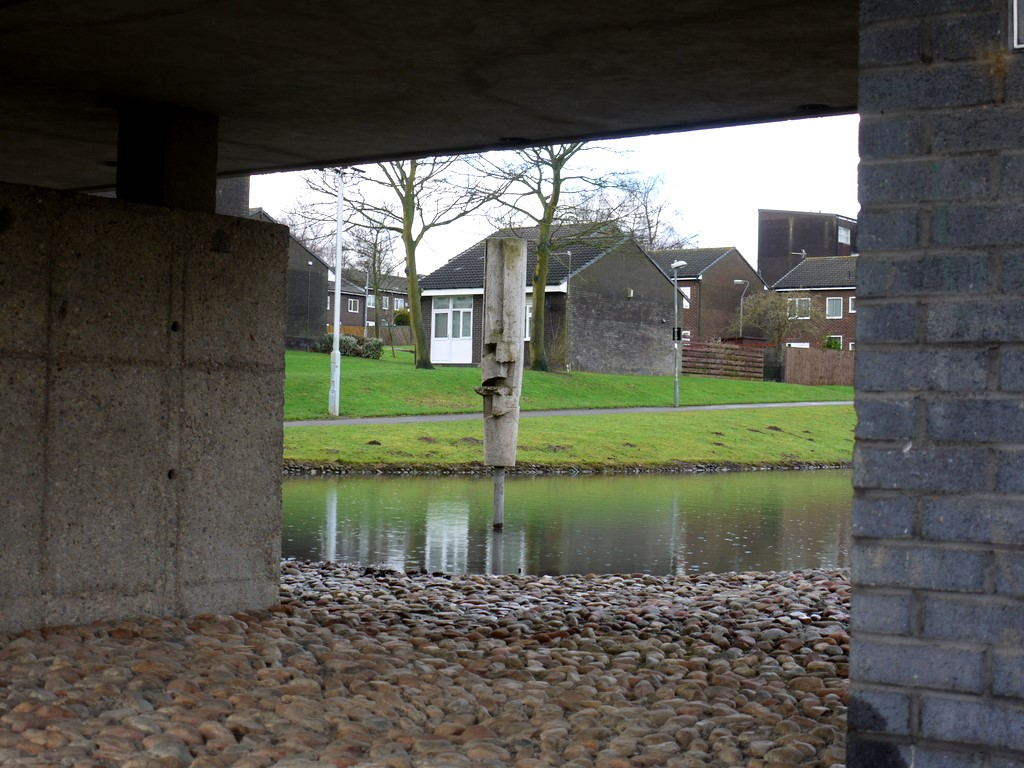
Beneath the Pavilion

In opposition to the residents' campaign, a friends group was organised by regional artists and cultural leaders. In 1998, English Heritage recommended the structure be given listed status but this was declined by Tony Banks in deference to the local political issue. In 2004, the Baltic Centre for Contemporary Art in Gateshead commissioned Jane and Louise Wilson to make a video installation featuring the Pavilion. In the mid-2000s, there was a proposal to restore the structure and enlarge the lake, so that the Pavilion would be less accessible.

In 2006, road signs were installed for directions to the Apollo Pavilion at the Passfield Way and Oakerside Drive junction saying 'Oakerside Drive leading to Pasmore's Apollo Pavilion'. Further down Oakerside Drive next to the Hearts of Oak public house is a road sign for the car park to visit the Pavilion and another sign for the footpath leading to the Pavilion.

Following a meeting at the Pavilion in September 2008, it was agreed that the structure would be repaired with lottery funding. Sunday July 11, 2009 at 4pm saw the official unveiling of the Apollo Pavilion, after £400,000 was spent on its restoration. One of the original two stair accesses was restored, as well as feature lighting, and both murals. £336,000 of the funds came from the Heritage Lottery Fund, while the remaining £65,000 was provided by Durham County Council.

Unveiling the commemorative plaque, John Pasmore, Victor's son, said, "I am delighted the pavilion has been restored to its original state and once again reflects my father's vision."

== See also ==
- Angel of the North
