= Hilton, County Durham =

Village and civil parish in County Durham, England

Coordinates: 54°35′18″N 1°44′42″W

Hilton is a village and civil parish in County Durham, about 9 miles (14 km) northwest of Darlington. Nearby places are Ingleton and Staindrop.

The 2011 Census recorded the parish population as less than 100. Information is kept in the parish of Bolam.

Hilton Hall is a former mediaeval chantry chapel that has been converted into a house, with 17th- and 18th-century additions. It is a Grade II* listed building.

== Bibliography ==
- Pevsner, Nikolaus; Williamson, Elizabeth (revision) (1983) [1953]. County Durham. The Buildings of England (2nd ed.). Harmondsworth: Penguin Books. p. 326. ISBN 0-14-071009-4.
