= St Mary's Church, Longnewton =

St. Mary's Church
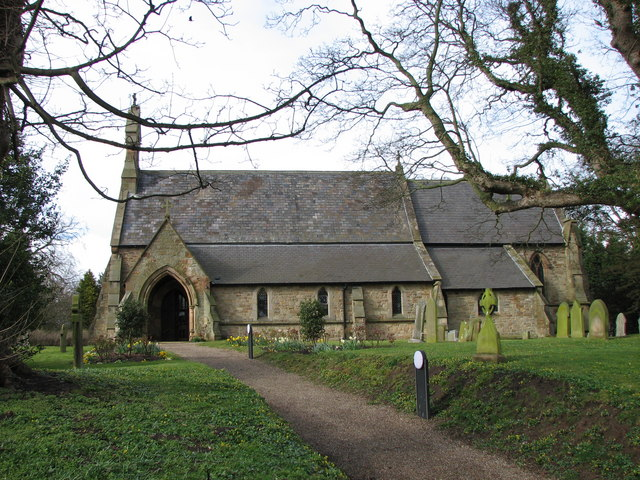
- St Mary's church

- St. Mary's Church shown within County Durham
- 54.542°N 1.409°W
- OS grid reference: NZ383165
- Location: Longnewton, Stockton-on-Tees
- Country: England
- Denomination: Anglican

History
- Status: Parish church
- Dedication: Blessed Virgin Mary
- Consecrated: Pre 1806

Architecture
- Functional status: Active

Administration
- Diocese: Durham

St. Mary's Church, Longnewton is a Church of England church in the parish of Longnewton, Stockton-on-Tees, Teesside, England. It is part of the benefice of All Saints' Church, Preston-on-Tees.

== Church building ==
It is a small stone building in the Early English style, twice rebuilt, in 1806 and in 1858, and occupying the site of a more ancient church.

There is a nave, chancel, and south aisle; north of the chancel, forming a transept, is the Londonderry mausoleum, within which is a sculptured white marble tomb of the third Marquis of Londonderry. The present building is Grade II* listed.

There was formerly a chantry in this church, dedicated to the Blessed Virgin Mary.

== Church Links ==
The church has links with St. Mary's Church of England Aided Primary School in Longnewton.
