= Chester New Bridge =

Bridge in County Durham, England

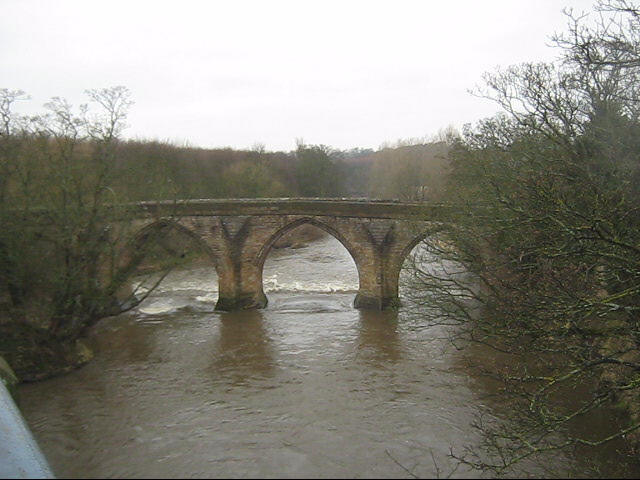
- Coordinates: 54.86458°N 1.558365°W
- Crosses: River Wear
- Locale: Chester-le-Street, Co. Durham
- Heritage status: Grade II* listed Scheduled Ancient Monument

Characteristics
- Material: Dressed stone
- Total length: 45 metres (148 ft)
- No. of spans: 4
- Piers in water: 3

Statistics

Listed Building – Grade II*
- Official name: Chester New Bridge
- Designated: 23 February 1987
- Reference no.: 1323102

Location
- Interactive map of Chester New Bridge

Chester New Bridge is a Grade II* listed medieval stone bridge over the River Wear near Chester-le-Street in County Durham, England. It carries Black Drive, the private entrance road to Lambton Castle, across the Wear just north of the A1052 road bridge, which superseded it in 1926. Frank Graham in Bridges of Northumberland and Durham describes it as "a fine 14th century bridge" but the official English Heritage listing citation considers it to be "probably C15". The parapet, which English Heritage suggest may be partly rebuilt, bears a worn inscription referring to "Charles Swinburne's Leap", an incident in which a horse and its rider were killed falling from the bridge. The bridge has a span of approximately 45 metres (148 ft) and four pointed arches with cutwaters on each pier. An archway at its eastern end, erected in 1815 by Ignatius Bonomi, marks the entrance to the Lambton Estate.
