= Westgate Methodist Chapel =

Coordinates: 54.7372°N 2.1482°W

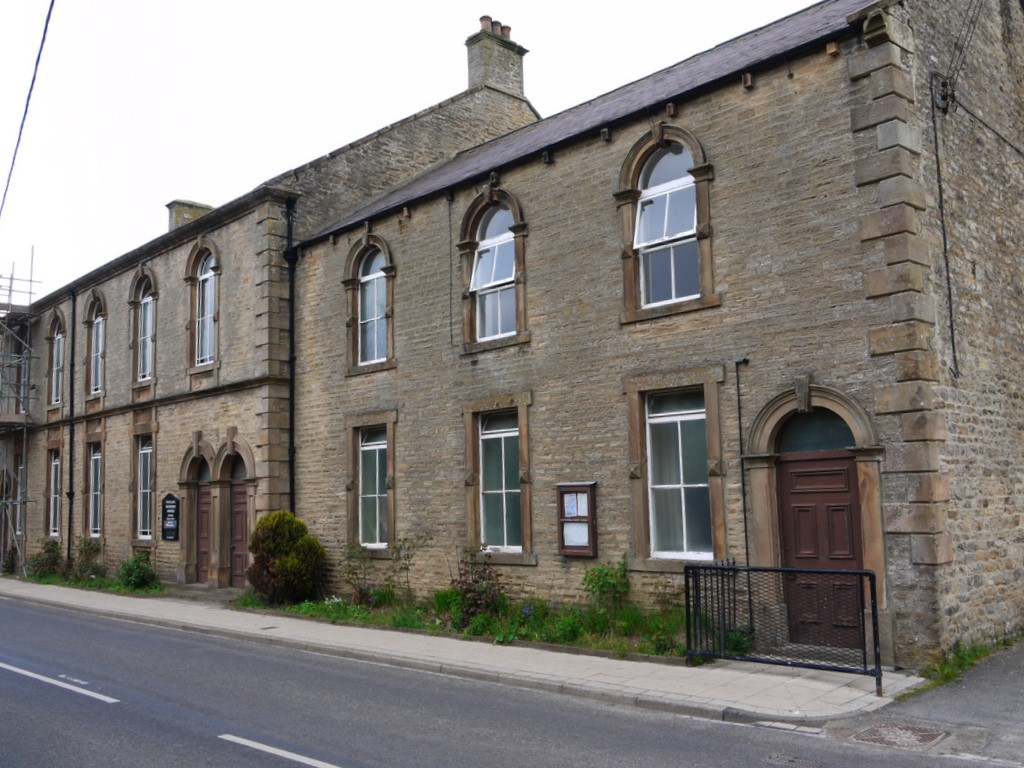

- Location in County Durham
- OS grid reference: NY 905 380
- Location: Westgate, County Durham
- Country: England
- Denomination: Methodist
- Website: Westgate Methodist Chapel

Architecture
- Functional status: Redundant
- Heritage designation: Grade II*
- Designated: 5 June 1987
- Architect(s): George Race junior and Mr Atkinson
- Architectural type: Chapel
- Groundbreaking: 1871
- Completed: 1871

Specifications
- Materials: Stone with slate roofs

Westgate Methodist Chapel stands on the A689 road in the village of Westgate, some 5 miles (8 km) west of Stanhope, County Durham, England (grid reference NY905380). It is a redundant chapel and is recorded in the National Heritage List for England as a designated Grade II* listed building.

== History ==
It cost £1,300 (equivalent to £132,400 as of 2025), and was attached to the earlier chapel which then became a schoolroom. The chapel closed in 2007, and was owned and partially restored by the Historic Chapels Trust from late 2009 until 2026, when ownership was transferred to Trades4Care, a local not-for-profit community interest company, with plans to restore the building and return it to community use.

== Architecture ==
The chapel is constructed in sandstone and has Welsh slate roofs. It is in two storeys and has five bays. There are two entrances on the south of the building, a single entrance in the westernmost bay, and a paired entrance in the easternmost bay. The ground floor windows have square heads, and the upper floor windows are round-headed. Over the lower windows is a series of inscribed panels. To the east, and slightly set back, is the former schoolroom, which is also has two storeys, and is in three bays. The windows are similar to those in the chapel.

Internally, the pulpit is at the west end. At the east end is an entrance lobby with two flights of stairs leading up to the gallery, which runs round all sides of the chapel. The gallery is carried on slim cast iron Corinthian columns that rise upwards to form an arcade above. The body of the chapel and the gallery contain rows of pitch pine pews. The organ is situated above the pulpit at the west end. It was built in about 1920 by Nelson & Co. of Durham, and has two manuals. In front of the pulpit is a dais surrounded by communion rails. On each side of this are curved doors leading to vestries with a store room between them. The ceiling contains coving with large panels; it is decorated with stucco leaves, cornices and roundels around the ventilators.

== See also ==
- List of chapels preserved by the Historic Chapels Trust
