= Holy Trinity Church, Darlington =

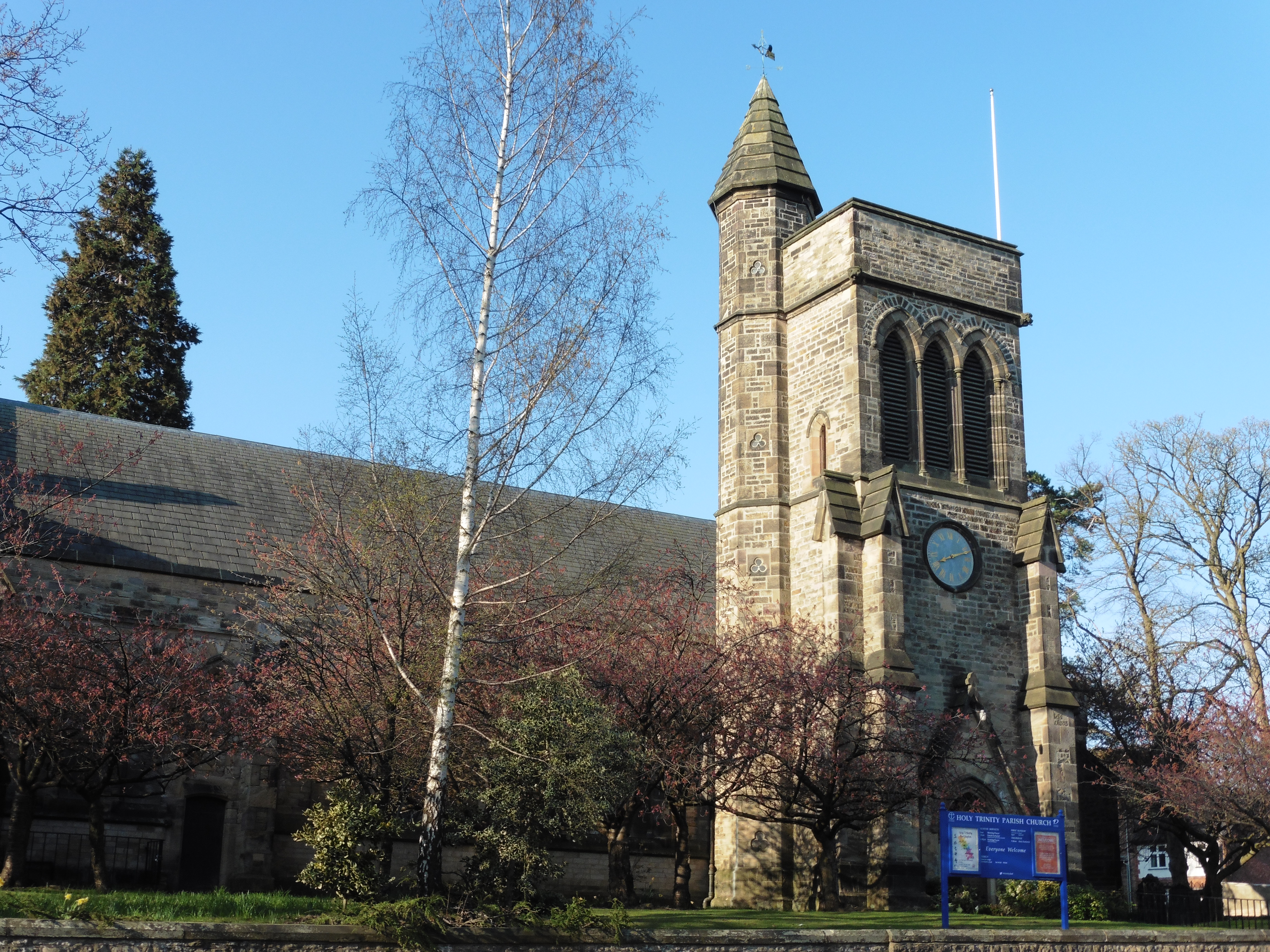
- Holy Trinity Church, Darlington

- Location within County Durham
- 54°31′40.4″N 1°33′51″W
- OS grid reference: NZ 28311 14818
- Location: Darlington
- Country: England
- Denomination: Church of England

Architecture
- Heritage designation: Grade II* listed
- Architect: Anthony Salvin
- Groundbreaking: 4 October 1836
- Construction cost: £3,404

Administration
- Diocese: Diocese of Durham
- Archdeaconry: Auckland
- Deanery: Darlington
- Parish: Holy Trinity Darlington

Holy Trinity Church, Darlington is a Grade II* listed Church of England church on Woodland Road, Darlington, County Durham.

== History ==
The church was designed by the architect Anthony Salvin and built between 1836 and 1838. It was assigned a parish in 1843 and at the same time a burial ground was consecrated by the Bishop of Durham.

The chancel was added in 1867 by Ross.

Restoration work was carried out in 1883 when the church was repaired, redecorated and reseated under the direction of the architect George Gordon Hoskins.

== Organ ==
The 3 manual organ was built by Thomas H. Harrison of Rochdale in 1868. A specification of the current organ can be found on the National Pipe Organ Register. It has been awarded a Grade II* listing by the British Institute of Organ Studies.
