= Legs Cross =

Stone cross in Bolam, County Durham, England

Coordinates: 54.5972°N 1.6808°W

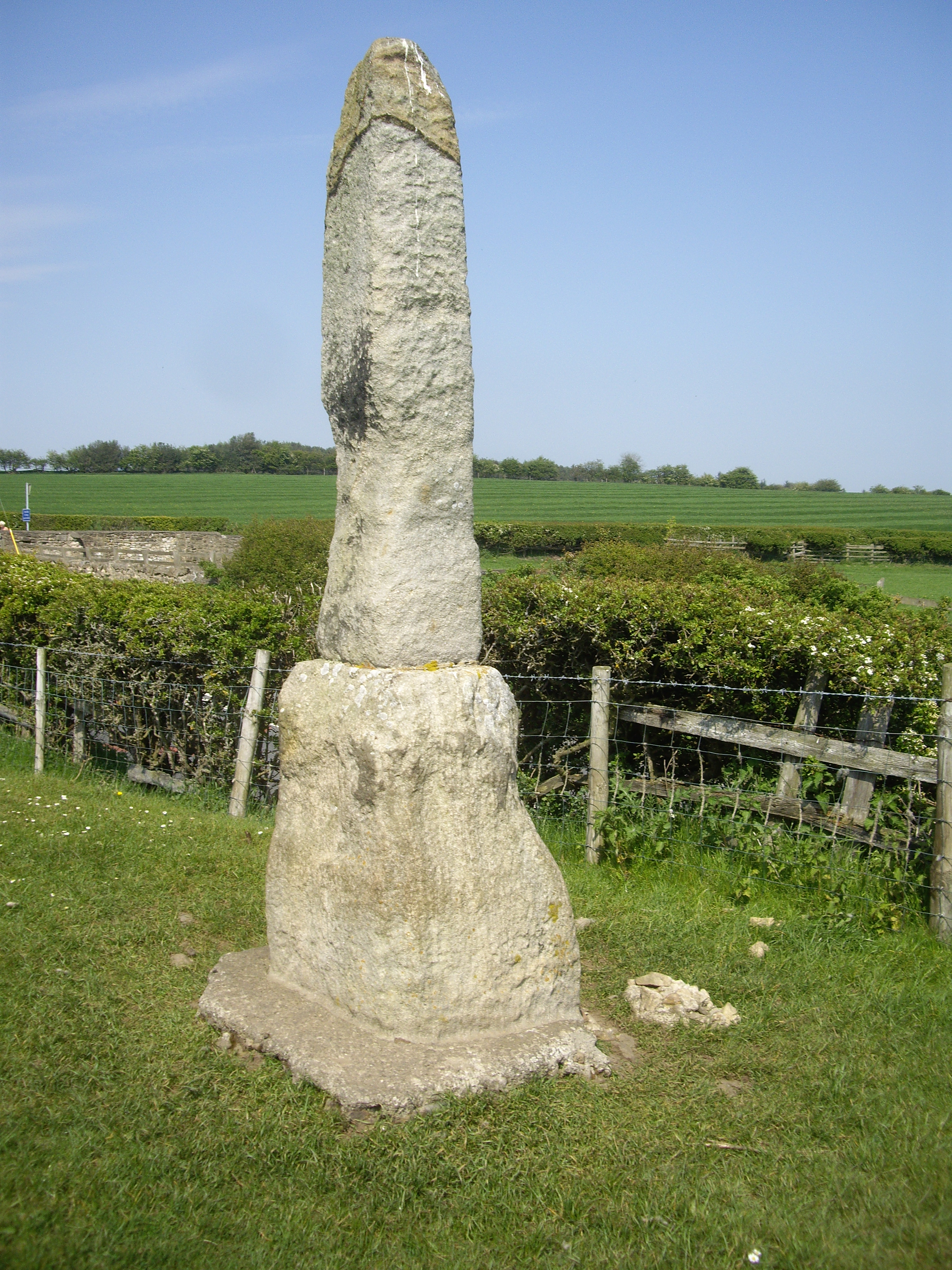
Legs Cross

Legs Cross is an Anglo-Saxon cross in the parish of Bolam, County Durham, England, about 4 miles (6.4 km) north of Piercebridge on the Pilgrims' Way (the modern B6275 and the old Roman road of Dere Street). It is a Grade II* listed structure, and a scheduled monument.

It was probably erected in the 9th century.

The sandstone cross is now eroded to an 2.6 metres (8 ft 6 in) high obelisk-like structure, on a triangular base. Some interlaced patterning remains.

Although it once had an inscription reading "LEGS X", which was chiselled off post 1966, giving rise to the name. It has been suggested that the cross was constructed from Roman masonry (nearby Piercebridge was once the site of a Roman fort) and that the inscription may have originally celebrated the 20th Legion (LEGIONIS).

Other theories for the origin of name include the fact that "legge" is the Anglo-Saxon word meaning "boundary." It has been also suggested that James VI of Scotland (later James I of England) rested here, with his legs crossed, on his way south to claim the English throne.
