= Longnewton =

Village in Stockton on Tees, England

Coordinates: 54.5412°N 1.41384°W

Long Newton
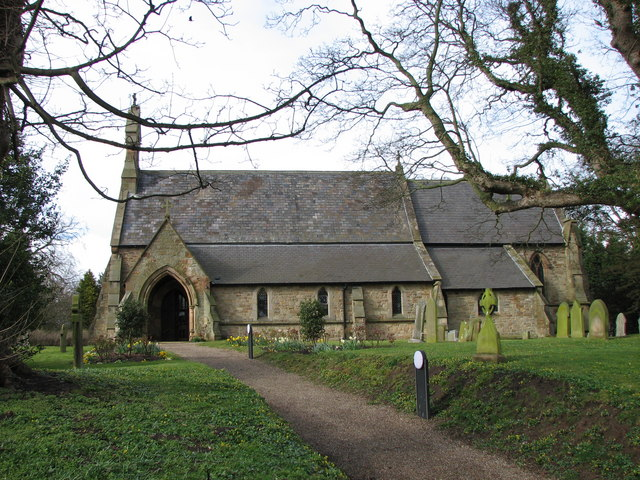
- St Mary's Church

- Location within County Durham
- Population: 845 (2001)
- OS grid reference: NZ3816
- Civil parish: Longnewton
- Unitary authority: Stockton-on-Tees
- Ceremonial county: County Durham
- Region: North East
- Country: England
- Sovereign state: United Kingdom
- Post town: STOCKTON-ON-TEES
- Postcode district: TS21
- Dialling code: 01642
- Police: Cleveland
- Fire: Cleveland
- Ambulance: North East
- UK Parliament: Stockton North

Longnewton (also known as Long Newton) is a village and civil parish in the borough of Stockton-on-Tees , England. The population taken at the 2001 Census was 733 increasing to 828 at the 2011 Census. It is situated between Darlington and Stockton-on-Tees. The village is mostly privately owned dwellings, and has a public house, The Derry, St. Mary's church and Saint Mary's Church of England primary school. Longnewton is not home to a secondary school however it is in the catchment area for Egglescliffe Secondary School, which is located 3 miles away and around a 10-minute drive. Located in the village is also a community centre, most commonly known as the Wilson Centre which has 3 different venue rooms, for a variety of activities and occasions. Longnewton is also a 10 minutes drive north of Teesside International Airport. In March 2007 a new bypass and junction on the A66 which runs just north of the village was created after almost 30 years of proposals, the junction was fully open to traffic in May 2008. A new roundabout has been put in place to service Teesside International Airport and ease traffic levels around the surrounding area.

== History ==
Historical population
Year	Pop.	±%
1801	295	—
1811	253	−14.2%
1821	338	+33.6%
1831	313	−7.4%
1841	293	−6.4%
1851	325	+10.9%
1861	353	+8.6%
1871	313	−11.3%
1881	268	−14.4%
1891	287	+7.1%
1901	386	+34.5%
1911	305	−21.0%
1921	439	+43.9%
1931	277	−36.9%
1951	359	+29.6%
1961	429	+19.5%
2001	733	+70.9%

The historical population of Longnewton fluctuated numerous times according to early data, in 1801 the population was recorded at 295, this had increased to 325 in 1851 however during this 50-year period the population had fluctuated to 253 in 1811, 338 in 1821, 313 in 1831 and 293 in 1841. The next recorded date was 1871 where the population was counted at 313, however this is disputed as John Marius Wilson stated the population at this time was 353. At this point in time he also described part of the village stating it was home to 67 houses, as well as this he also wrote that there was a large manor, that was home to Marchioness of Londonderry and was valued at £604. By 1901 the population continued to grow along with the development of Longnewton at this stage there were 386 inhabitants and this grew to 439 by 1921. However, in 1961 levels of population had decreased to 429, although this could be linked to the decline of jobs in the north, due to the drop in manufacturing jobs at this time.

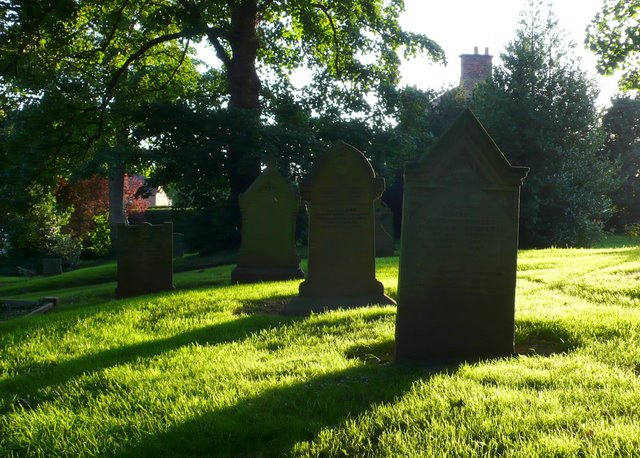
Cemetery at St Mary's Longnewton

Today Longnewton has 733 residents, and with this 302 households, with only 29 not owning a car. The rural location of the village means that the average distance travelled to work for residents is 25.77 km, with only 8 being able to use public transport to get there.

=== Church ===
St. Mary’s church is an Anglican church situated in the centre of the village. The earliest description available of the church was in 1793 by William Hutchinson. The description stated that the church had no aisles or tower, and only a small chancel. There was also an ornamented area containing two seats, divided by a small column. However, despite this the earliest description being in the 18th century, the architecture in the church itself are of 13th century age and suggest that the church is from relatively early period. The church has since had to be rebuilt twice taking place in 1806 and in 1858. The new structure still occupies original site of the church. The current construction was built by Frances Vane, Marchioness of Londonderry, and is where the present Londonderry Arms public house takes its name. Subsequent to the rebuild, the church was developed considerably, and now consists of a nave, chancel, and south aisle. The church now seats 240. It has a traditional Sunday service, as well as a number of community activities for all ages taking place every day of the week.

== Geography ==
=== Climate ===
Climate data for Longnewton, Stockton-on-tees
Month	Jan	Feb	Mar	Apr	May	Jun	Jul	Aug	Sep	Oct	Nov	Dec	Year
Mean daily maximum °C (°F)	6 (43)	7 (45)	9 (48)	11 (52)	14 (57)	17 (63)	20 (68)	19 (66)	17 (63)	13 (55)	9 (48)	7 (45)	12 (54)
Mean daily minimum °C (°F)	1 (34)	1 (34)	2 (36)	3 (37)	6 (43)	8 (46)	11 (52)	11 (52)	11 (52)	6 (43)	3 (37)	2 (36)	5 (42)
Average precipitation mm (inches)	56.1 (2.21)	38.9 (1.53)	51.1 (2.01)	52.1 (2.05)	49.5 (1.95)	54.9 (2.16)	44.4 (1.75)	61.2 (2.41)	57.4 (2.26)	56.9 (2.24)	61.5 (2.42)	59.2 (2.33)	643.13 (25.32)

== Facilities ==
=== St Mary's Church of England Aided Primary School, Longnewton ===
St Mary’s Primary school is much smaller than that of the average sized primary school in the United Kingdom. It is a mixed gender school, with ages ranging from 3–11. Judith Skirving is the current head teacher, and at present there are 111 pupils attending. In the January 2012 Ofsted inspections, the school gained a rating of 2, meaning 'good', in each of the following areas, Achievement of pupils, quality of teaching, behaviour and safety of pupils, leadership and management and overall effectiveness. .

=== The Wilson Centre ===
The Wilson Centre was built in 1886 donated by Rev. J. Wilson, the vicar of St Mary’s Church to be used to benefit the education of the population of Longnewton. The centre was built by Mr Kipling and cost a total of £380, it was subsequently named the Wilson Institute after Rev. J. Wilson himself. In 2003 it was decided to explore the option of using the building as a village hall. A £266,000 grant was obtained from the Big Lottery Community Halls Fund in 2008. The centre was refurbished and finally opened again in October 2009. The Wilson Centre offers three rooms, one of these providing seating for up to 80 people. and is £13 per hour. The other two rooms are smaller, and offer seating for up to 15 and 40 people these costing £5 and £9 per hour respectively. The centre also offers a modern kitchen, which comes at a price of £11, and is set up with Wi-Fi access.

=== Public House ===
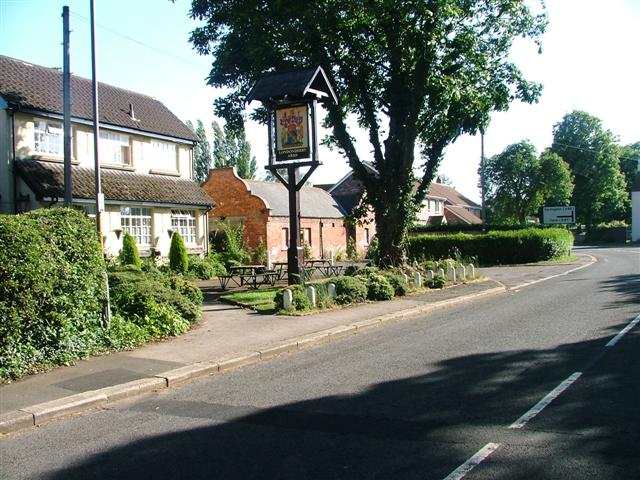
Londonderry Arms, Long Newton

The Derry (previously The Londonderry Arms) is named after the third Marquis of Londonderry, who has played an instrumental part in the history and development in the village of Longnewton.

== Transport ==
=== A66 Junction ===
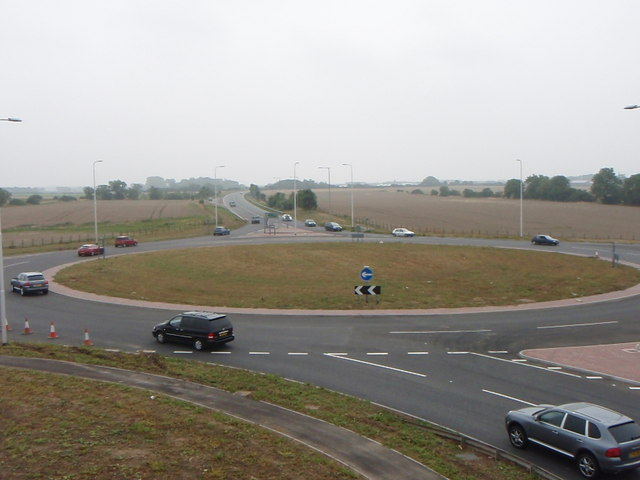
New A66 Roundabout and Junction

The A66 is a two lane dual carriageway that runs between Stockton on Tees and Darlington, around 32,000 vehicles pass through it every day. There are currently two junctions located near Longnewton and Elton, giving access to Teesside International Airport and the local area. The Longnewton junction was subject to calls for it to be renovated due to high accident rates in the area, as in the period from January–December 2003 there were 108 casualties in Stockton on tees district with many of these being on the A66 stretch of road. The aim of the project was to construct a bridge and slip roads to allow local traffic to leave the dual carriageway and join the main road safely. It would also create a new road link from Longnewton to Elton, making it easier for all modes of transport to commute between villages, additionally improving access to the airport. The cost of the whole project came to a total of £12 million. Locals had been campaigning for action, for around 15 years, to address what had been described as a 'death trap' junction, with the number of casualties.

=== Bus Services ===
Bus services from Long newton stopped running in April 2014 due to council funding cuts. A community bus service was proposed for the village. Without access to a car, transport links become very strenuous.

=== Rail services ===
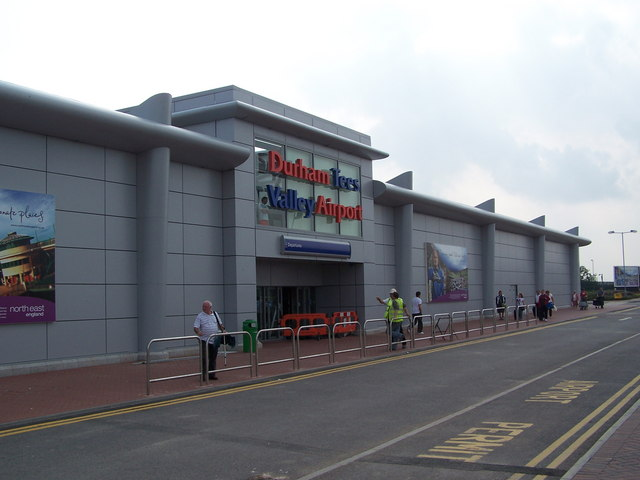
Durham Tees Valley Airport Terminal Building

There is no railway station in Longnewton, however there are several stations nearby which are accessible by car, or possibly bus. The nearest station is Teesside Airport railway station although this is effectively non-functional as only two trains stop there a week, however, there are others nearby including those of Dinsdale, Allens West and Eaglescliffe. Darlington station is a more mainline station, however this is a 15-minute journey from Longnewton with no direct bus routes.

=== Teesside International Airport ===
Teesside International Airport is located south of Longnewton, just under three miles away by road. It is relatively small, receives arrivals and disperses departures to the following European nations; Bulgaria, Italy, Netherlands, Spain and the United Kingdom.
