= Headlam =

Village in County Durham, England

Coordinates: 54°33′56″N 1°43′20″W

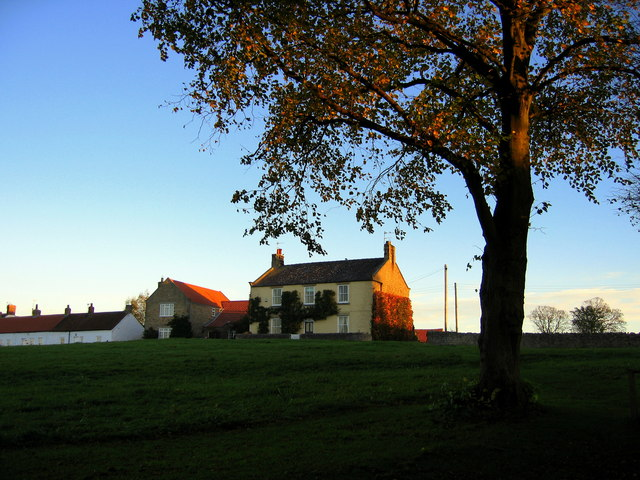
- A house in Headlam

- Location within County Durham
- Population: 41 (2021 census)
- Civil parish: Headlam
- Unitary authority: County Durham
- Ceremonial county: Durham
- Region: North East
- Country: England
- Sovereign state: United Kingdom
- Police: Durham
- Fire: County Durham and Darlington
- Ambulance: North East

Headlam is a hamlet and civil parish in County Durham, England. It lies to the west of Darlington. In 2021 the parish had a population of 41. The hamlet has 14 stone houses plus 17th-century Headlam Hall, now a country house hotel. The village is set around a village green with a medieval cattle-pound and an old stone packhorse bridge across the beck. Headlam is classed as Lower Teesdale and has views to the south as far as Richmond and to the Cleveland Hills in the east.

In the Imperial Gazetteer of England and Wales (1870–72) John Marius Wilson described Headlam:

HEADLAM, a township in Gainford parish, Durham: 7½ miles WNW of Darlington. Acres, 780. Real property, £1,216. Pop., 102. Houses, 21.
