= Butter Market =

Butter Market or Buttermarket can refer to:

- Buttermarket Centre, Ipswich, shopping centre in England
- General Market, Wrexham, in Wales
- Market Cross, Barnard Castle, in England
- Old Town Hall, Bakewell, in England

== See also ==
- Butter cross
