= County Durham =

County of England

County Durham Durham
- Ceremonial county
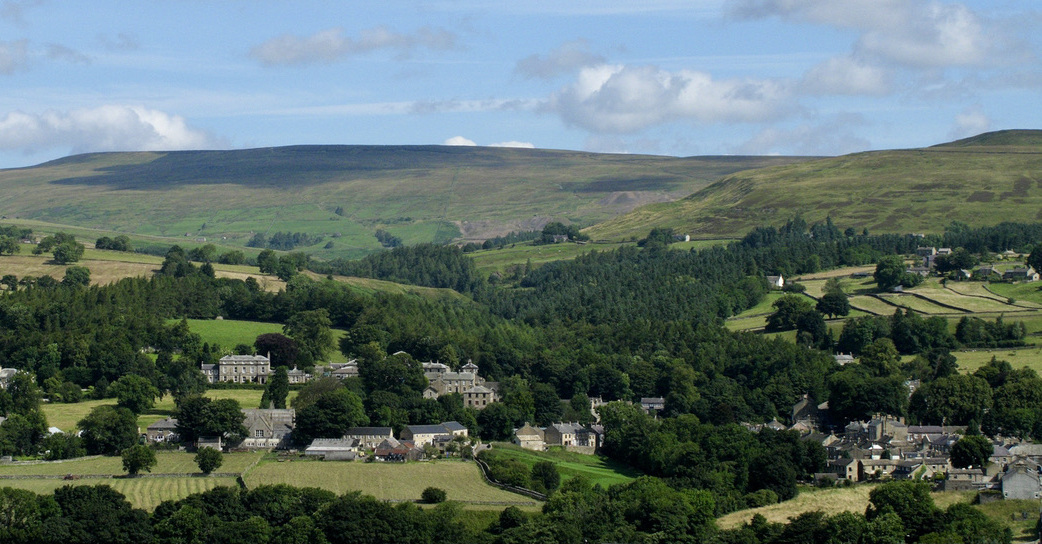
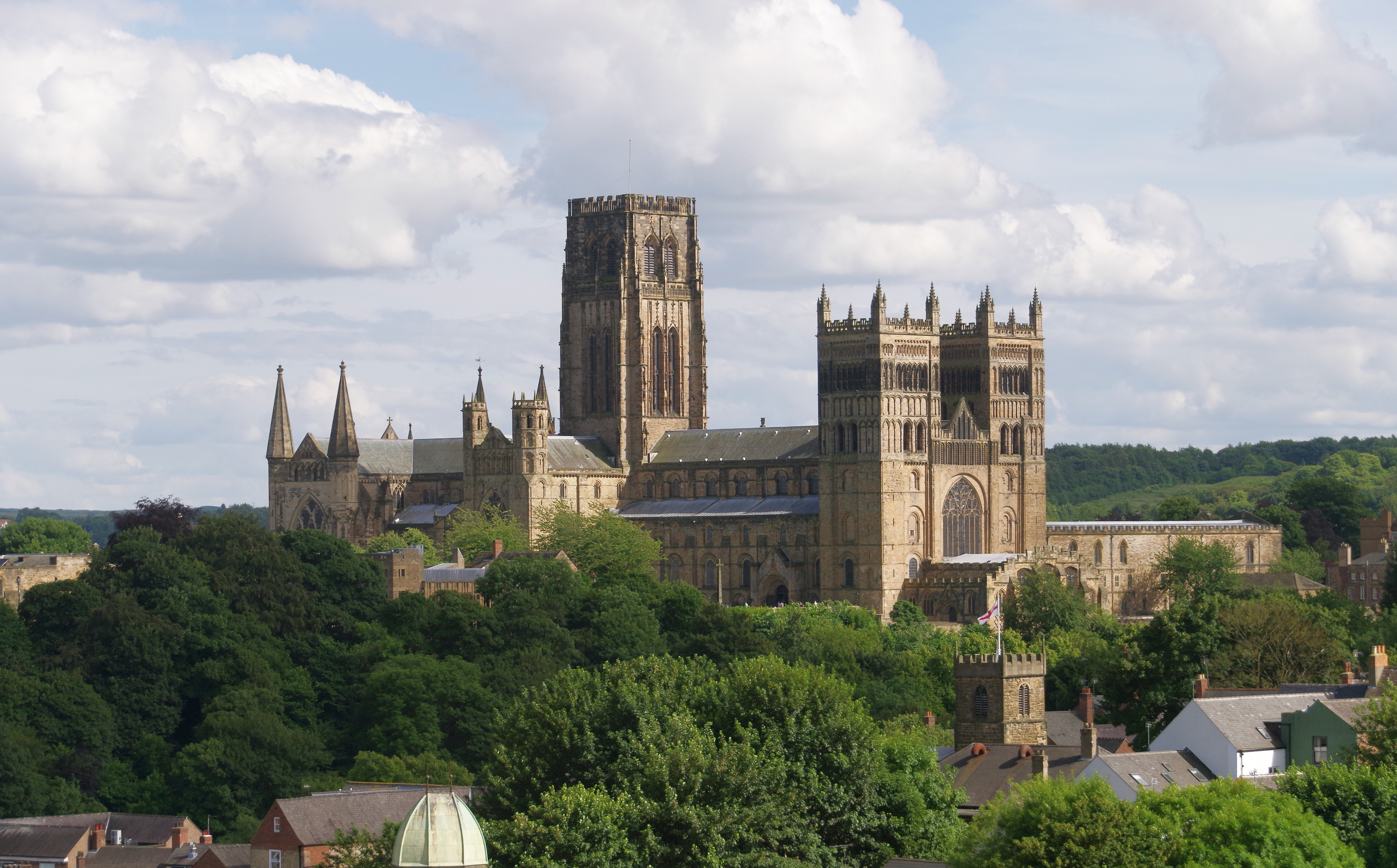
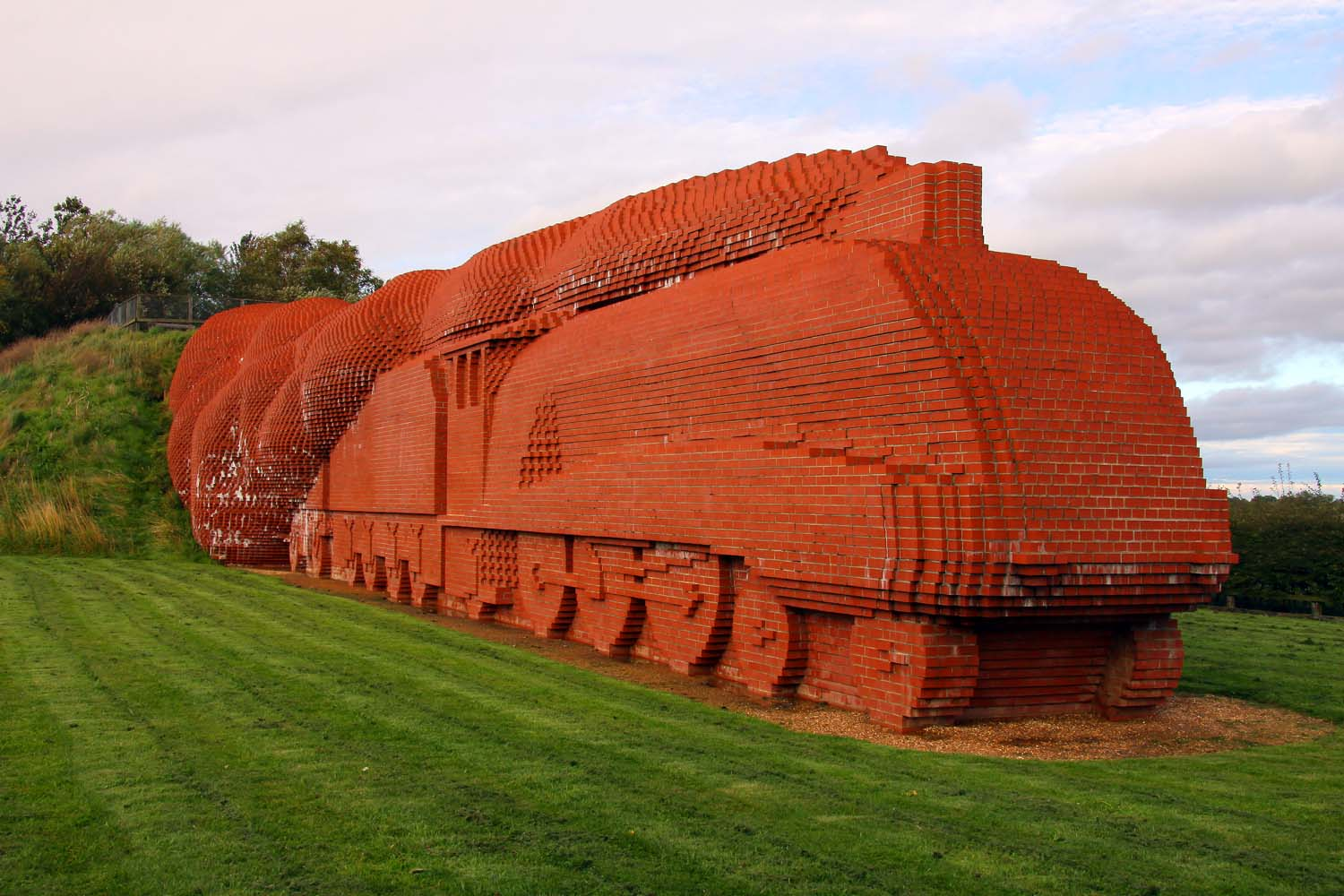
- Top to bottom: view over Middleton-in-Teesdale in the Durham Dales, Durham Cathedral, and Brick Train near Darlington
- Interactive map of County Durham
- Coordinates: 54°40′N 1°50′W
- Sovereign state: United Kingdom
- Constituent country: England
- Region: North East England
- Established: Ancient
- Time zone: UTC+0 (GMT)
  - Summer (DST): UTC+1 (BST)
- UK Parliament: List
- Police: Durham Constabulary; Cleveland Police
- Largest town: Darlington
- Ceremonial county
- Lord Lieutenant: Susan Snowdon
- High Sheriff: Arnab Basu
- Area: 2,676 km^{2} (1,033 sq mi)
  - Rank: 19th of 48
- Population (2024): 894,025
  - Rank: 28th of 48
  - Density: 334/km^{2} (870/sq mi)
- Unitary authorities
- Councils: Darlington Borough; Durham County; Hartlepool Borough; Stockton-on-Tees Borough
- Districts
- Districts of County Durham; Unitary
- Districts: 1. County Durham; 2. Hartlepool; 3. Darlington; 4. Stockton-on-Tees (north)

County Durham, (Note: /ˈdʌrəm/, locally /ˈdɜːrəm/ in places on the River Wear or /ˈdʊrəm/ in general northern England English including places on the River Tees.) also called simply Durham, is a ceremonial county in North East England. The county borders Northumberland and Tyne and Wear to the north, the North Sea to the east, North Yorkshire to the south, and Cumbria to the west. The largest settlement is Darlington.

The county has an area of 2,676 square kilometres (1,033 sq mi) and had an estimated population of 894,025 in 2024. The centre and east of the county are more densely populated than the west, and the major settlements include Hartlepool on the south-east coast, Stockton-on-Tees in the south-east, Darlington in the south, and the city of Durham in the north-centre. Stockton-on-Tees is part of the Teesside conurbation, which extends into North Yorkshire. Barnard Castle is the largest town in the west of the county. For local government purposes the county comprises the unitary authority areas of County Durham, Darlington, Hartlepool, and part of Stockton-on-Tees. Durham County Council is part of the North East Combined Authority, and the councils of the other three areas are part of the Tees Valley Combined Authority. The part of Tyne and Wear south of the River Tyne was historically part of County Durham, and the part of Durham south of the River Tees was historically part of the North Riding of Yorkshire.

The west of the county contains part of the North Pennines uplands, a national landscape. The hills are the source of the rivers Tees and Wear, which flow east and form the valleys of Teesdale and Weardale respectively. The east of the county is flatter, and the two rivers meander through it; the Tees forms the boundary with North Yorkshire in its lower reaches, and the Wear exits the county near Chester-le-Street in the north-east. The county's coast is characterised by tall limestone and dolomite cliffs and is a site of special scientific interest.

What is now County Durham was on the border of Roman Britain, and contains survivals of this era at sites such as Binchester Roman Fort. In the Anglo-Saxon period the region was part of the Kingdom of Northumbria. In 995 the city of Durham was founded by monks seeking a place safe from Viking raids to house the relics of St Cuthbert. Durham Cathedral was rebuilt after the Norman Conquest, and together with Durham Castle is now a World Heritage Site. By the late Middle Ages the county was governed semi-independently by the bishops of Durham and was also a buffer zone between England and Scotland. County Durham became heavily industrialised in the nineteenth century, when many collieries opened on the Durham coalfield. The Stockton and Darlington Railway, the world's first public railway to use steam locomotives, opened in 1825. Most collieries closed during the last quarter of the twentieth century, but the county's coal mining heritage is remembered in the annual Durham Miners' Gala.

== Toponymy ==
The ceremonial county is officially named Durham, but the county has long been commonly known as County Durham and it is the only English county name prefixed with "County" in common usage (a practice common in Ireland). Its unusual naming (for an English shire) is explained to some extent by the relationship with the Bishops of Durham, who for centuries governed Durham as a county palatine (the County Palatine of Durham) outside the usual structure of county administration in England.

Early attestations of the county name include Dunelmensischira (Durhamshire) from c. 1100 and Comitatus Dunelmensis (County Durham) from 1344.

The situation regarding the formal name in modern local government is less clear:

- The 2009 structural change legislation created the present unitary council (that covers a large part – but not all – of the ceremonial county) refers to "the county of County Durham" and names the new unitary district "County Durham" too.
  - A later amendment to that legislation refers to the "county of Durham" and the amendment allows for the unitary council to name itself "The Durham Council".
- The council retains the name as Durham County Council. With either option, the name does not include County Durham.
- The former postal county was named "County Durham" to distinguish it from the post town of Durham.

== History ==
=== Anglian Kingdom of Bernicia ===
Around 547 CE, an Angle named Ida founded the kingdom of Bernicia after spotting the defensive potential of a large rock at Bamburgh, upon which many a fortification was thenceforth built. Ida was able to forge, hold and consolidate the kingdom; although the native British tried to take back their land, the Angles triumphed and the kingdom endured.

=== Kingdom of Northumbria ===
In 604 CE, Ida's grandson Æthelfrith forcibly merged Bernicia (ruled from Bamburgh) and Deira (ruled from York, which was known as Eforwic at the time) to create the Kingdom of Northumbria. In time, the realm was expanded, primarily through warfare and conquest; at its height, the kingdom stretched from the River Humber (from which the kingdom drew its name) to the Forth. Eventually, factional fighting and the rejuvenated strength of neighbouring kingdoms, most notably Mercia, led to Northumbria's decline. The arrival of the Vikings hastened this decline, and the Scandinavian raiders eventually claimed the Deiran part of the kingdom in 867 (which became Jórvík). The land that would become County Durham now sat on the border with the Great Heathen Army, a border which today still forms the boundaries between the historic counties of Yorkshire and County Durham.

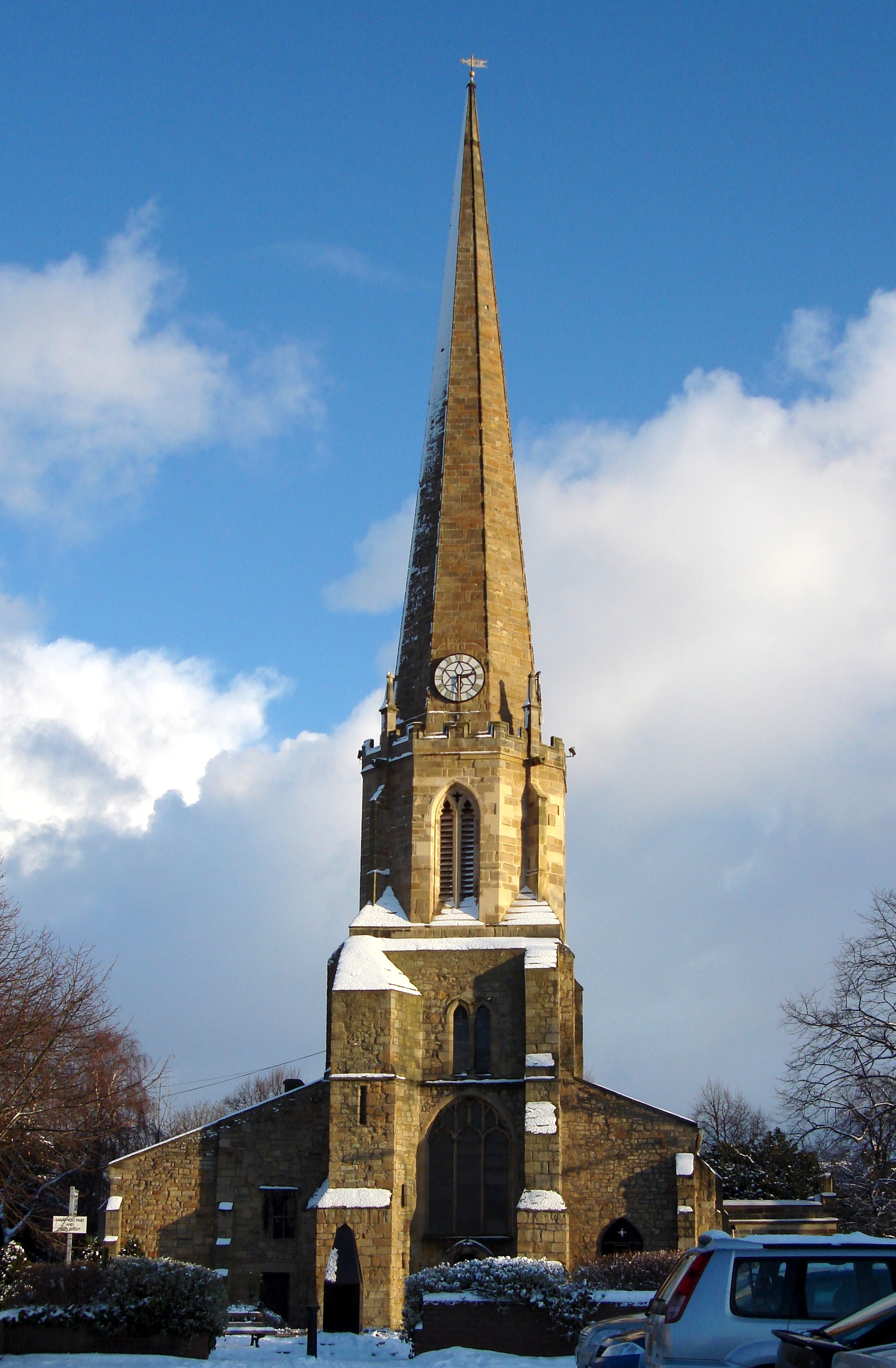
The Church of St Mary and St Cuthbert, Chester-le-Street, on the site of the wooden ninth century church built by the Lindisfarne monks

Viking settlement petered out at the Tees and the lands north thereof lay outside of the Danelaw. The House of Bamburgh, successors of the Kings of Bernicia and Northumbria, retained control north of the Tyne; between the Tyne and the Tees emerged the Community of St. Cuthbert or Haliwerfolc, successors of the See of Lindisfarne. The House of Wessex absorbed the Kingdom of York into the unified English Kingdom in 954 and claimed overlordship over Northumbria. However, the lands north of the Tees remained outside the governmental frontiers of the English realm, thus Bamburgh and the Haliwerfolc went on to become contested buffer states between England and Scotland.

=== City of Durham founded ===
In 995 CE, St Cuthbert's community, who had been transporting Cuthbert's remains around, partly in an attempt to avoid them falling into the hands of Viking raiders, settled at Dunholm (Durham) on a site that was defensively favourable due to the horseshoe-like course of the River Wear. St Cuthbert's remains were placed in a shrine in the White Church, which was originally a wooden structure but was eventually fortified into a stone building.

Once the City of Durham had been founded, the Bishops of Durham gradually acquired the lands that would become County Durham. Bishop Aldhun began this process by procuring land in the Tees and Wear valleys, including Norton, Stockton, Escomb and Aucklandshire in 1018. In 1031, King Canute gave Staindrop to the Bishops. This territory continued to expand, and was eventually given the status of a liberty. Under the control of the Bishops of Durham, the land had various names: the "Liberty of Durham", "Liberty of St Cuthbert's Land" "the lands of St Cuthbert between Tyne and Tees" or "the Liberty of Haliwerfolc" (holy Wear folk).

The bishops' special jurisdiction rested on claims that King Ecgfrith of Northumbria had granted a substantial territory to St Cuthbert on his election to the see of Lindisfarne in 684. In about 883 a cathedral housing the saint's remains was established at Chester-le-Street and Guthfrith, King of York granted the community of St Cuthbert the area between the Tyne and the Wear, before the community reached its final destination in 995, in Durham.

Following the Norman invasion, the administrative machinery of government extended only slowly into northern England. Northumberland's first recorded Sheriff was Gilebert from 1076 until 1080 and a 12th-century record records Durham regarded as within the shire. However, the bishops disputed the authority of the sheriff of Northumberland and his officials, despite the second sheriff, for example, being the reputed slayer of Malcolm Canmore, King of Scots. The crown regarded Durham as falling within Northumberland until the late thirteenth century.

=== County Palatine of Durham ===
Matters regarding the bishopric of Durham came to a head in 1293 when the bishop and his steward failed to attend proceedings of quo warranto held by the justices of Northumberland. The bishop's case went before parliament, where he stated that Durham lay outside the bounds of any English shire and that "from time immemorial it had been widely known that the sheriff of Northumberland was not sheriff of Durham nor entered within that liberty as sheriff. . . nor made there proclamations or attachments". The arguments appear to have prevailed, as by the fourteenth century Durham was accepted as a liberty which received royal mandates direct. In effect it was a private shire, with the bishop appointing his own sheriff. The area eventually became known as the "County Palatine of Durham".

Sadberge was a liberty, sometimes referred to as a county, within Northumberland. In 1189 it was purchased for the see but continued with a separate sheriff, coroner and court of pleas. In the 14th century Sadberge was included in Stockton ward and was itself divided into two wards. The division into the four wards of Chester-le-Street, Darlington, Easington and Stockton existed in the 13th century, each ward having its own coroner and a three-weekly court corresponding to the hundred court. The diocese was divided into the archdeaconries of Durham and Northumberland. The former is mentioned in 1072, and in 1291 included the deaneries of Chester-le-Street, Auckland, Lanchester and Darlington.

The term palatinus is applied to the bishop in 1293 and, from the 13th century onwards, the bishops frequently claimed the same rights in their lands as the king enjoyed in his kingdom.

=== Early administration ===
==== Overview ====
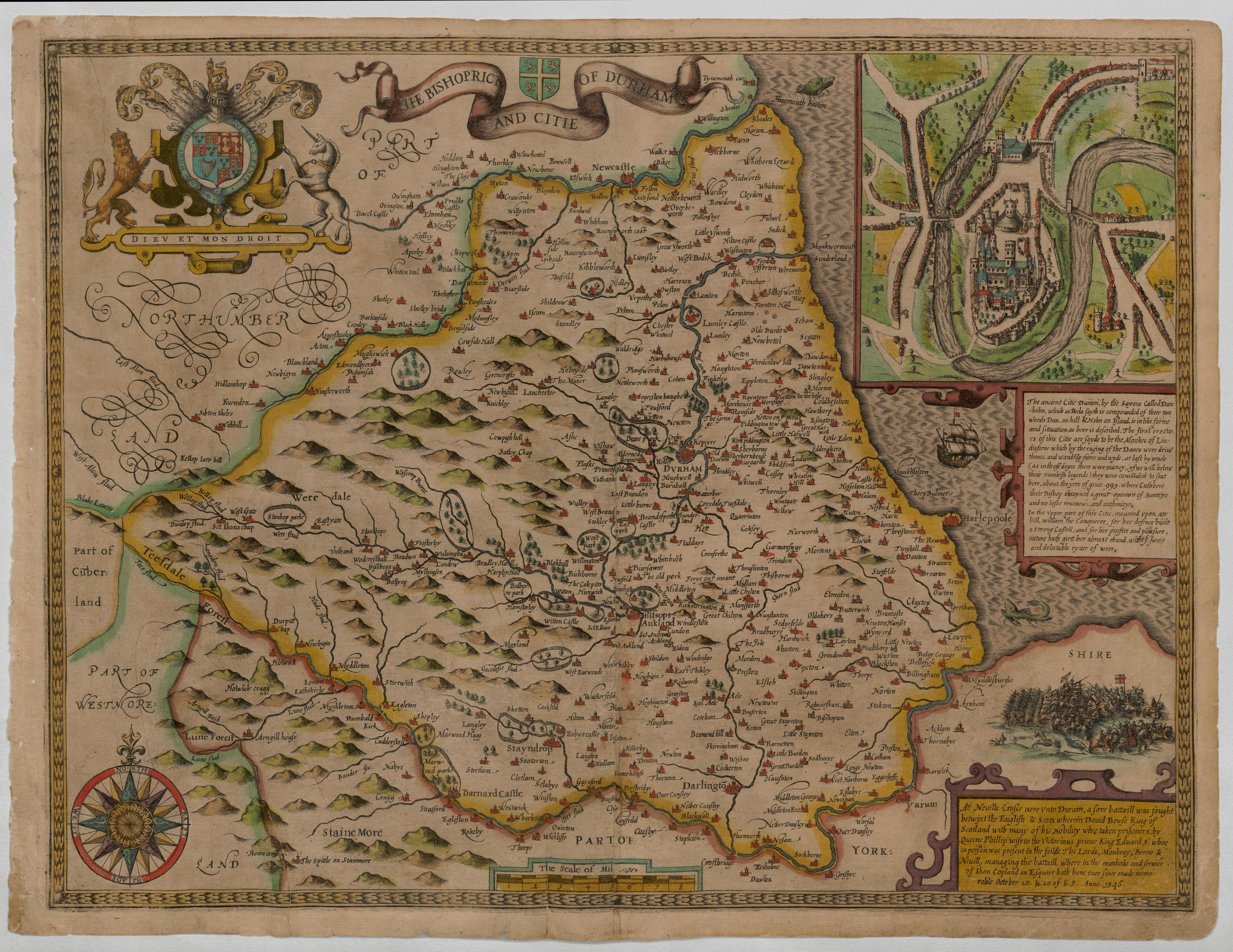
The historic boundaries of the county shown in John Speed's map of the county in his Theatre of the Empire of Great Britaine, c. 1611. These boundaries remained in use for administrative purposes until the local government reforms starting in the 1960s. A depiction of the city of Durham is inset in the top right.

The historic boundaries of County Durham included a main body covering the catchment of the Pennines in the west, the River Tees in the south, the North Sea in the east and the Rivers Tyne and Derwent in the north. The county palatinate also had a number of liberties: the Bedlingtonshire, Islandshire and Norhamshire exclaves within Northumberland, and the Craikshire exclave within the North Riding of Yorkshire. In 1831 the county covered an area of 679,530 acres (2,750.0 km^{2}) and had a population of 253,910. These exclaves were included as part of the county for parliamentary electoral purposes until 1832, and for judicial and local-government purposes until the coming into force of the Counties (Detached Parts) Act 1844, which merged most remaining exclaves with their surrounding county. The boundaries of the county proper remained in use for administrative and ceremonial purposes until the Local Government Act 1972.

==== Early English and Norman period ====
Following the Battle of Hastings, William the Conqueror appointed Copsig as Earl of Northumbria, thereby bringing what would become County Durham under Copsig's control. Copsig was, just a few weeks later, killed in Newburn. Having already being previously offended by the appointment of a non-Northumbrian as Bishop of Durham in 1042, the people of the region became increasingly rebellious. In response, in January 1069, William despatched a large Norman army, under the command of Robert de Comines, to Durham City. The army, believed to consist of 700 cavalry (about one-third of the number of Norman knights who had participated in the Battle of Hastings), entered the city, whereupon they were attacked, and defeated, by a Northumbrian assault force. The Northumbrians wiped out the entire Norman army, including Comines, all except for one survivor, who was allowed to take the news of this defeat back.

Following the Norman slaughter at the hands of the Northumbrians, resistance to Norman rule spread throughout Northern England, including a similar uprising in York. William the Conqueror subsequently (and successfully) attempted to halt the northern rebellions by unleashing the notorious Harrying of the North (1069–1070). Because William's main focus during the harrying was on Yorkshire, County Durham was largely spared the Harrying. The best remains of the Norman period include Durham Cathedral and Durham Castle, and several parish churches, such as St Laurence Church in Pittington. The Early English period has left the eastern portion of the cathedral, the churches of Darlington, Hartlepool, and St Andrew, Auckland, Sedgefield, and portions of a few other churches.

==== Palatinate ====
Until the 15th century, the most important administrative officer in the Palatinate was the steward. Other officers included the sheriff, the coroners, the Chamberlain and the chancellor. The palatine exchequer originated in the 12th century. The palatine assembly represented the whole county, and dealt chiefly with fiscal questions. The bishop's council, consisting of the clergy, the sheriff and the barons, regulated judicial affairs, and later produced the Chancery and the courts of Admiralty and Marshalsea.

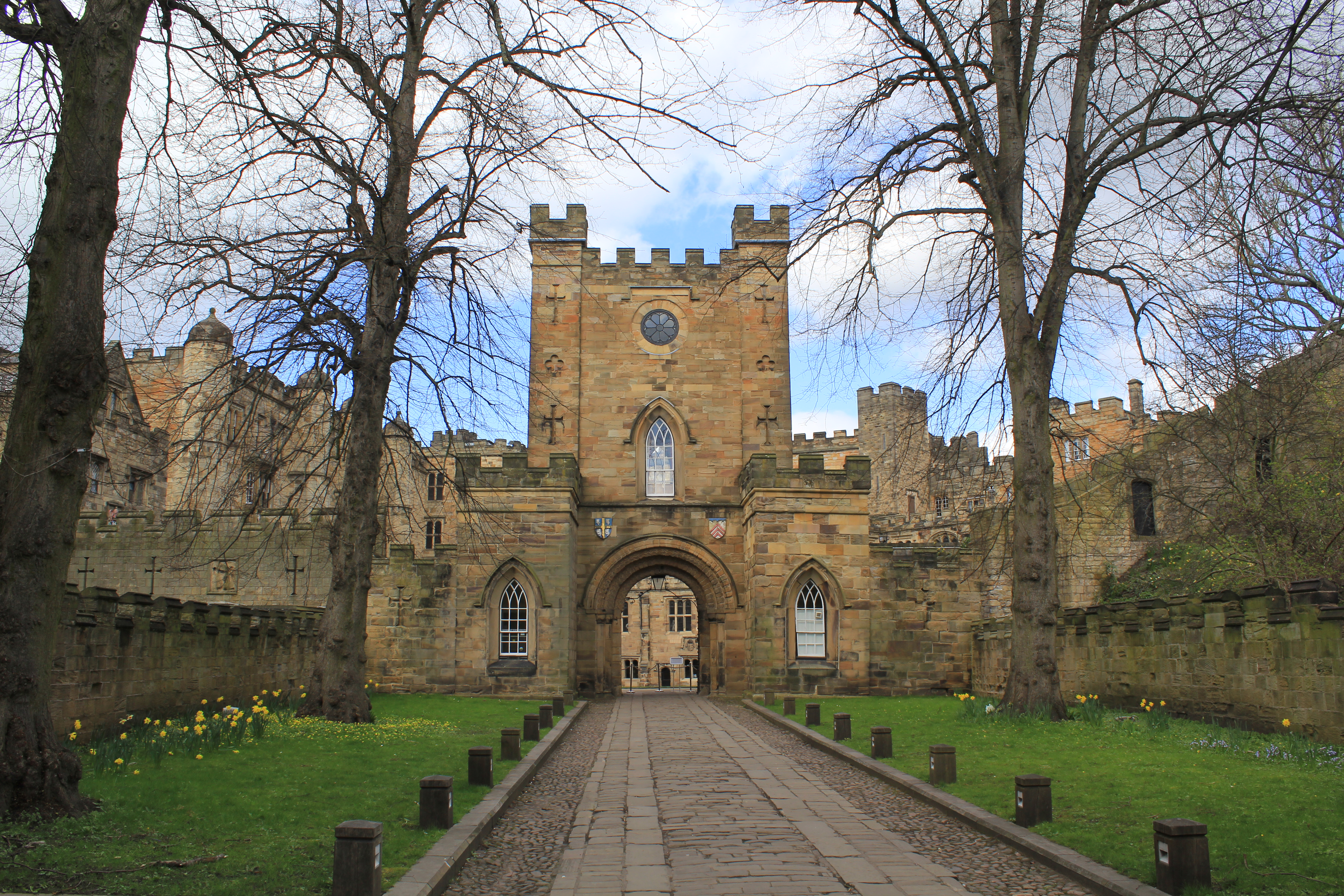
The entrance to Durham Castle, the bishops' palace until 1832 when it moved to Auckland Castle

The prior of Durham ranked first among the bishop's barons. He had his own court, and almost exclusive jurisdiction over his men. A UNESCO site describes the role of the bishops in Durham, the "buffer state between England and Scotland":

From 1075, the Bishop of Durham became a Prince-Bishop, with the right to raise an army, mint his own coins, and levy taxes. As long as he remained loyal to the king of England, he could govern as a virtually autonomous ruler, reaping the revenue from his territory, but also remaining mindful of his role of protecting England's northern frontier.

A report states that the Bishops also had the authority to appoint judges and barons and to offer pardons.

There were ten palatinate barons in the 12th century, most importantly the Hyltons of Hylton Castle, the Bulmers of Brancepeth, the Conyers of Sockburne, the Hansards of Evenwood, and the Lumleys of Lumley Castle. The Nevilles owned large estates in the county. John Neville, 3rd Baron Neville de Raby rebuilt Raby Castle, their principal seat, in 1377.

Edward I's quo warranto proceedings of 1293 showed twelve lords enjoying more or less extensive franchises under the bishop. The repeated efforts of the Crown to check the powers of the palatinate bishops culminated in 1536 in the Jurisdiction in Liberties Act 1535, which deprived the bishop of the power to pardon offences against the law or to appoint judicial officers. Moreover, indictments and legal processes were in future to run in the name of the king, and offences to be described as against the peace of the king, rather than that of the bishop. In 1596 restrictions were imposed on the powers of the chancery, and in 1646 the palatinate was formally abolished. It was revived, however, after the Restoration, and continued with much the same power until 5 July 1836, when the Durham (County Palatine) Act 1836 (6 & 7 Will. 4. c. 19) provided that the palatine jurisdiction should in future be vested in the Crown.

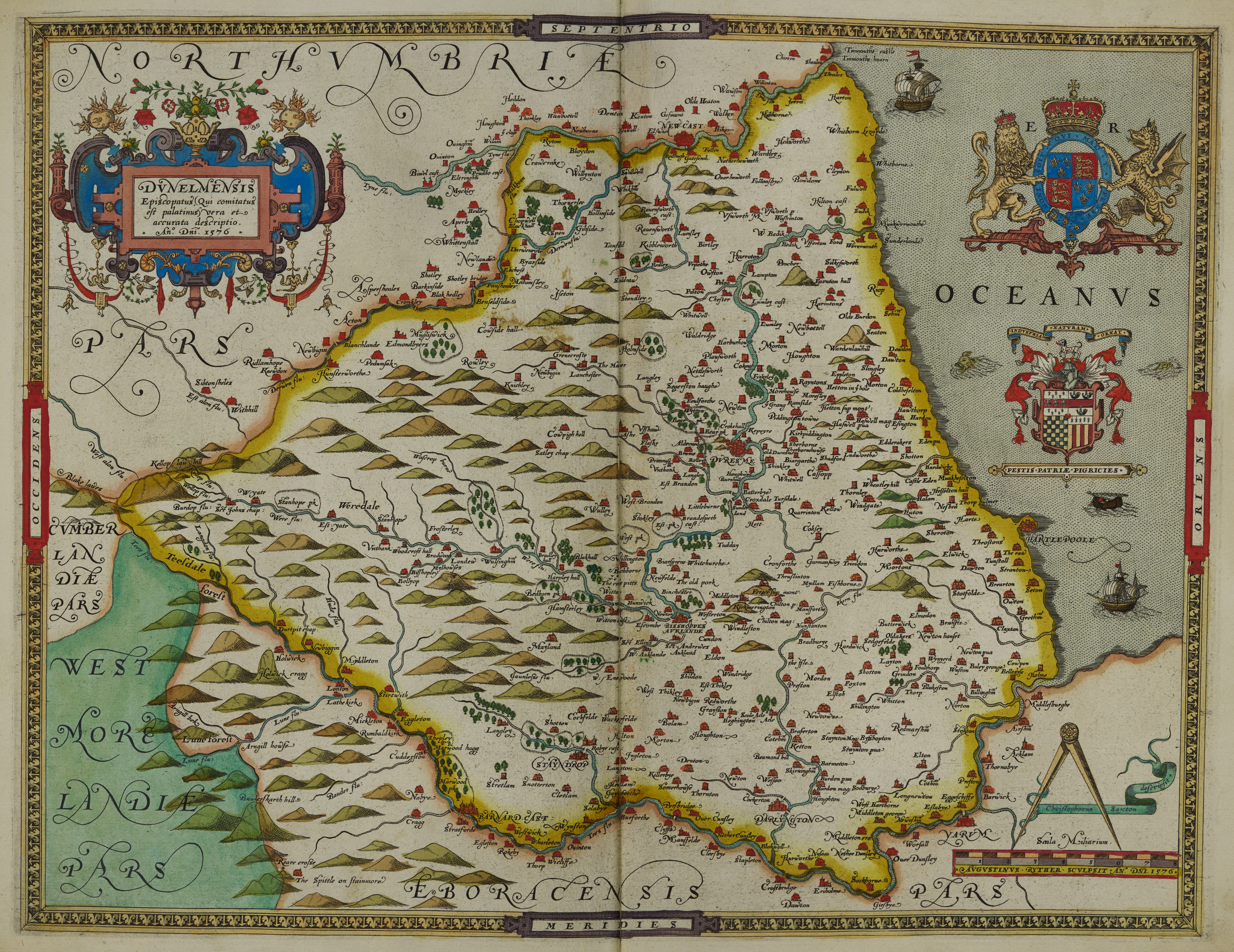
Hand-drawn map of Durham by Christopher Saxton in 1576

==== Wars ====
During the 15th-century Wars of the Roses, Henry VI passed through Durham. On the outbreak of the Great Rebellion in 1642 Durham inclined to support the cause of Parliament, and in 1640 the high sheriff of the palatinate guaranteed to supply the Scottish army with provisions during their stay in the county. In 1642 the Earl of Newcastle formed the western counties into an association for the King's service, but in 1644 the palatinate was again overrun by a Scottish army, and after the Battle of Marston Moor (2 July 1644) fell entirely into the hands of Parliament.

==== Parliamentary representation and secular powers ====
In 1614, a bill was introduced in Parliament for securing representation to the county and city of Durham and the borough of Barnard Castle. The bishop strongly opposed the proposal as an infringement of his palatinate rights, and the county was first summoned to return members to Parliament in 1654. After the Restoration of 1660 the county and city returned two members each. In the wake of the Reform Act 1832 the county returned two members for two divisions, and the boroughs of Gateshead, South Shields and Sunderland acquired representation. The bishops lost their secular powers in 1836. The boroughs of Darlington, Stockton and Hartlepool returned one member each from 1868 until the Redistribution of Seats Act 1885.

== Geography ==
=== Urban ===
The historic county excludes the village of Startforth, the ceremonial county excludes the city of Sunderland and the non-metropolitan county excludes the town of Stockton-on-Tees. The ceremonial county includes the non-metropolitan county with the addition of the boroughs of Darlington, Hartlepool, and Stockton-on-Tees. The historic county's boundaries stretched from the rivers Tyne to Tees and it is covered by the ceremonial county, the city of Sunderland, the boroughs of Gateshead and South Tyneside, while the non-metropolitan county includes part of Yorkshire.

County Durham contains a small area of the North East Green Belt in the county's north; surrounding the city of Durham, Chester-le-Street and other communities along the shared county border with Tyne and Wear, avoiding Wearside's spread west. A smaller green belt separates Urpeth, Ouston, Pelton, and Perkinsville from Birtley in Tyne and Wear. A further small segment by the coast separates Seaham from the Sunderland settlements of Beckwith Green and Ryhope. It was first drawn up in the 1990s.

=== Geology ===
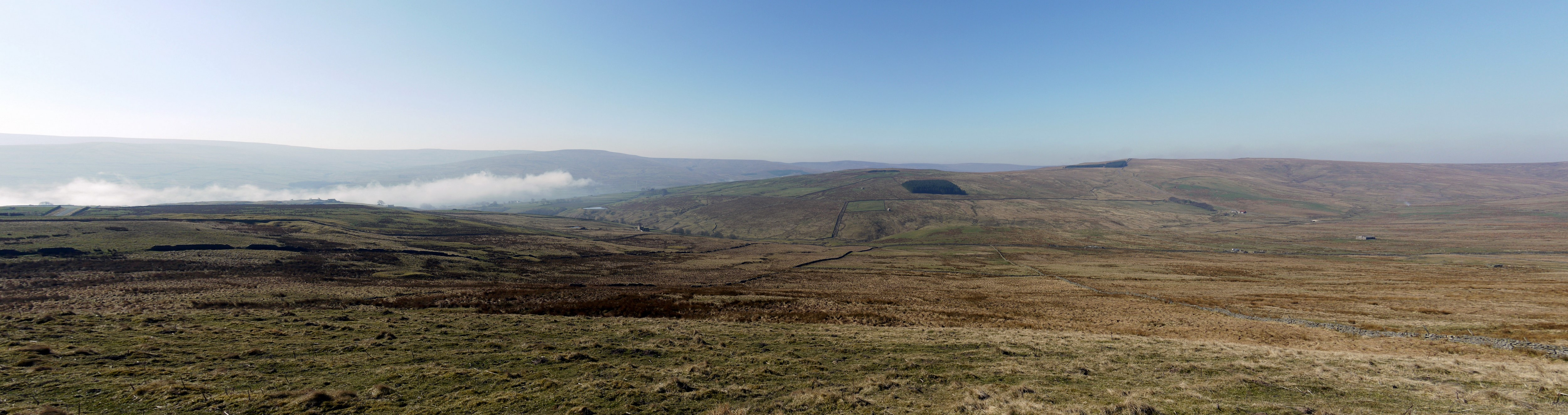
The moors above Weardale

County Durham is underlain by Carboniferous rocks in the west. Permian and Triassic strata overlie these older rocks in the east. These sedimentary sequences have been cut by igneous dykes and sills.

The county contains a sizeable area of the North Pennines, designated an Area of Outstanding Natural Beauty, primarily west of Tow Law and Barnard Castle. The highest point (county top) of historic County Durham is the trig point (not the summit) of Burnhope Seat, height 746 metres (2,448 ft), between Weardale and Teesdale on the border with historic Cumberland in the far west of the county. The local government reorganisation of 1974 placed the higher Mickle Fell south of Teesdale (the county top of Yorkshire) within the administrative borders of Durham (where it remains within the ceremonial county). However, it is not generally recognised as the highest point in Durham.

The two main dales of County Durham (Teesdale and Weardale) and the surrounding fells, many of which exceed 2,000 feet (610 m) in height, are excellent hillwalking country, although not nearly as popular as the nearby Yorkshire Dales and Lake District national parks. The scenery is rugged and remote, and the high fells have a landscape typical of the Pennines with extensive areas of tussock grass and blanket peat bog in the west, with heather moorland on the lower slopes descending to the east.

=== Climate ===
County Durham

Climate chart (precipitation, max. and min. temperature)
J	F	M	A	M	J	J	A	S	O	N	D
56 6 1	39 7 1	51 9 2	52 11 3	50 15 6	55 17 9	45 20 11	61 20 11	58 17 9	57 13 6	62 9 3	59 7 2
- █ Average max. and min. temperatures in °C
- █ Precipitation totals in mm
Imperial conversion
J	F	M	A	M	J	J	A	S	O	N	D
2.2 43 33	1.5 44 33	2 48 36	2 52 38	1.9 58 42	2.2 63 47	1.8 68 51	2.4 67 51	2.3 62 47	2.2 55 43	2.4 48 38	2.3 45 35
- █ Average max. and min. temperatures in °F
- █ Precipitation totals in inches

The following climate figures were gathered at the Durham weather station between 1981 and 2010:

Climate data for Durham Coordinates 54°46′04″N 1°35′04″W; elevation: 102 m (335 ft) 1991–2020 normals, extremes 1843–2023
Month	Jan	Feb	Mar	Apr	May	Jun	Jul	Aug	Sep	Oct	Nov	Dec	Year
Record high °C (°F)	16.3 (61.3)	17.4 (63.3)	21.8 (71.2)	24.1 (75.4)	29.7 (85.5)	30.7 (87.3)	36.9 (98.4)	32.5 (90.5)	30.0 (86.0)	25.3 (77.5)	19.3 (66.7)	15.9 (60.6)	36.9 (98.4)
Mean daily maximum °C (°F)	6.9 (44.4)	7.8 (46.0)	9.9 (49.8)	12.5 (54.5)	15.4 (59.7)	18.0 (64.4)	20.2 (68.4)	19.9 (67.8)	17.4 (63.3)	13.5 (56.3)	9.7 (49.5)	7.1 (44.8)	13.2 (55.8)
Daily mean °C (°F)	4.1 (39.4)	4.6 (40.3)	6.2 (43.2)	8.3 (46.9)	10.9 (51.6)	13.6 (56.5)	15.8 (60.4)	15.6 (60.1)	13.3 (55.9)	10.0 (50.0)	6.6 (43.9)	4.2 (39.6)	9.5 (49.1)
Mean daily minimum °C (°F)	1.3 (34.3)	1.4 (34.5)	2.5 (36.5)	4.1 (39.4)	6.5 (43.7)	9.3 (48.7)	11.3 (52.3)	11.3 (52.3)	9.2 (48.6)	6.5 (43.7)	3.6 (38.5)	1.4 (34.5)	5.7 (42.3)
Record low °C (°F)	−16.9 (1.6)	−18.0 (−0.4)	−15.0 (5.0)	−11.1 (12.0)	−4.8 (23.4)	−0.8 (30.6)	1.4 (34.5)	0.0 (32.0)	−1.7 (28.9)	−5.3 (22.5)	−12.0 (10.4)	−16.4 (2.5)	−18.0 (−0.4)
Average precipitation mm (inches)	51.8 (2.04)	44.6 (1.76)	41.1 (1.62)	51.2 (2.02)	44.4 (1.75)	61.0 (2.40)	60.9 (2.40)	66.5 (2.62)	56.9 (2.24)	63.4 (2.50)	73.0 (2.87)	61.0 (2.40)	675.7 (26.60)
Average precipitation days (≥ 1.0 mm)	11.8	9.9	8.6	9.1	8.6	9.9	10.7	10.3	9.4	11.8	12.0	12.0	124.1
Mean monthly sunshine hours	60.9	84.4	121.7	160.8	187.1	167.1	174.3	167.3	135.3	98.9	64.6	57.6	1,480
Source 1: Met Office
Source 2: Durham Weather

== Governance ==
=== Local ===
Since 2009, County Durham has comprised the unitary authority areas of County Durham, Darlington, Hartlepool, and the part of Stockton-on-Tees that is north of the River Tees. The councils of the four areas are unitary authorities, meaning they combine the functions of a non-metropolitan county council and a non-metropolitan district council in order to provide most local government services in their area. These include education, libraries, roads, social care, waste, environment, and housing.

The county is partially parished. The city of Durham is the most populous settlement in the county to have a parish. Multiple parishes are styled as having town councils: Billingham (in Stockton Borough), Barnard Castle, Bishop Auckland, Chilton, Ferryhill, Great Aycliffe, Newton Aycliffe, Greater Willington, Peterlee, Seaham, Sedgefield, Shildon, Spennymoor, Stanley and Tow Law.

The ceremonial county itself has only a minor administrative function, being the area to which the Lord Lieutenant of Durham is appointed; the shrieval county has the same boundaries and is the area to which the High Sheriff of Durham is appointed.

==== History ====
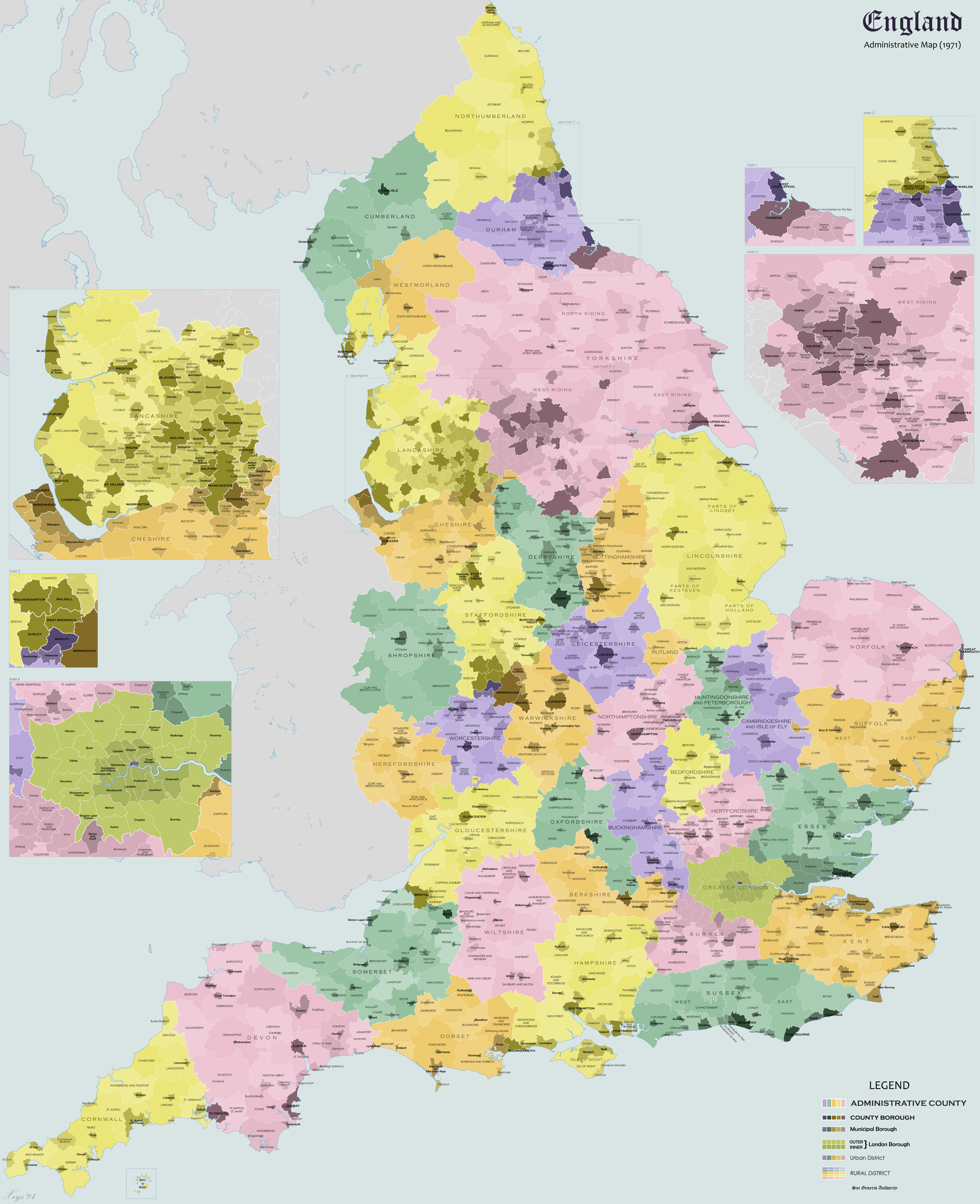
A map of England in 1971, including County Durham, showing the administrative boundaries before the Local Government Act 1972.

The Local Government Act 1888 reformed English local government by creating administrative counties, county boroughs, and elected county councils and county borough councils to govern them. County boroughs largely consisted of those settlements with a population over 50,000, and administrative counties covered smaller towns and rural areas. Under the Act, County Durham was reconstituted as an administrative county and Gateshead, South Shields, and Sunderland became county boroughs. West Hartlepool became a county borough in 1902, and Darlington in 1915. In 1967, the county borough of Middlesbrough, which was part of County of York, North Riding, was abolished and replaced with the larger county borough of Teesside, which included Stockton-on-Tees and adjacent areas.

The Local Government Act 1972, which came into effect in 1974, reformed English local government again. It introduced metropolitan counties, which covered the largest urban areas, and non-metropolitan counties elsewhere. Both types of county were divided into districts, with local government functions divided between a county council and district councils. The north-east of Durham, including Gateshead, South Shields, and Sunderland, became part of the metropolitan county of Tyne and Wear. The south-east, including West Hartlepool and Teesside, became part of the non-metropolitan county of Cleveland. The remaining parts of the former administrative county, together with Darlington and the Startforth Rural District from the North Riding of Yorkshire (which comprised southern Teesdale and the area to the south), became part of the new non-metropolitan county of Durham.

From 1974 until 1996, the non-metropolitan county contained eight non-metropolitan districts, with the provision of local government services divided between Lancashire County Council and the district councils. The districts were Chester-le-Street, Derwentside, Darlington, Durham, Easington, Sedgefield, Teesdale, and Wear Valley. In 1996, Darlington became a unitary authority area. In the same year, Cleveland was abolished and its former districts became unitary authority areas. Hartlepool and the part of Stockton-on-Tees south of the River Tees became part of County Durham for ceremonial purposes. In 2009, the remaining seven districts of County Durham were abolished and Durham County Council was reconstituted as a unitary authority.

=== Parliament ===
The county boundaries used for parliamentary constituencies were originally those used between 1974 and 1996, consisting of the County Durham district and the Darlington Borough, until boundary changes in 2024. This area elects eight Members of Parliament. County Durham itself elects six of them, and as of the 2024 general election, all of these MPs are Labour. The rest of the ceremonial county is included in the Cleveland parliamentary constituency area.

2024 General Election Results in County Durham
Party	Votes	%	Change from 2019	Seats	Change from 2019
Labour	104,518	43.7	▲3.3%	6	▲3
Reform UK	54,168	22.6	▲14.2%	0	0
Conservative	48,348	20.2	▼20.4%	0	▼4
Liberal Democrats	15,538	6.5	▼0.5%	0	0
Greens	12,747	5.3	▲2.3%	0	0
Others	3,848	1.6		0	
Total	239,167	100.0		6	

== Emergency services ==
The police and fire services operate according to the 1974–96 ceremonial county boundaries:

- Durham Constabulary, Ron Hogg was first elected the Durham Police and Crime Commissioner for the force on 15 November 2012, and held the position until his death in office in 2019.
- Cleveland Police
- County Durham and Darlington Fire and Rescue Service, it is under supervision of a combined fire authority consisting of 25 local councillors: 21 from Durham County Council and 4 from Darlington Borough Council.
- Cleveland Fire Brigade.

The North East Ambulance Service NHS Trust cover North East England and are responsible for providing ambulance services for the NHS. Northumbria Ambulance Service and County Durham Ambulance Service (following historic county borders) merged on 1 April 1999 to become the North East service. In 2005 the area was adapted to the modern North East England regional extent.

Air ambulance services are provided by the Great North Air Ambulance. The charity operates three bases, including one in Eaglescliffe.

Teesdale and Weardale Search and Mountain Rescue Team, are based at Sniperly Farm in Durham City and respond to search and rescue incidents in the county.

== Demography ==
=== Population ===
#	Local authority	2011 census
–	Ceremonial county	853,213
1	District of County Durham	513,242
2	Borough of Stockton-on-Tees (north Tees)	136,079
3	Borough of Darlington	105,564
4	Borough of Hartlepool	92,028

The Office for National Statistics estimated in 2016 that the Durham County Council area had a population of 522,100, the Borough of Darlington a population of 105,600, the Borough of Hartlepool a population of 92,800, and the part of the Borough of Stockton-on-Tees in County Durham (the other part being in North Yorkshire) a population of 137,300. (Note: The total estimated population of the Borough of Stockton-on-Tees (195,700) less the populations of the electoral wards of Ingleby Barwick East, Ingleby Barwick West, Mandale and Victoria, Stainsby Hill, Village, and Yarm.) This gives the total estimated population of the ceremonial county at 857,800.

=== Employment ===
The proportion of the population working in agriculture fell from around 6% in 1851 to 1% in 1951; currently less than 1% of the population work in agriculture. There were 15,202 people employed in coal mining in 1841, rising to a peak of 157,837 in 1921.

=== Settlements ===
Towns and Cities of County Durham
(Civil parishes used for population counts where possible, otherwise the source closest to the locality's boundaries.)
The five largest settlements currently in County Durham, as of the 2021 UK census. – Red.
The five largest settlements which were historically in County Durham, but now lie outside the modern county boundaries, as of the 2021 UK census. – Orange.
Urban settlements across current and historic County Durham which have been earmarked as locations for new towns, or a large planned population increase. – Green.

County Durham has a mostly rural character, especially in the west. Small population centres scatter between Durham, Crook, Bishop Auckland, Shildon, Newton Aycliffe, Sedgefield and Peterlee. These places were populated by the draw of collieries during the Industrial Revolution. The south east side of the county Between Hartlepool and Darlington form part of Teesside with settlements on the south side of the river. While the north east part of the county (on the border with Tyne and Wear) forms part of Tyneside and Wearside.

=== Changes ===
==== Former non-metropolitan county ====
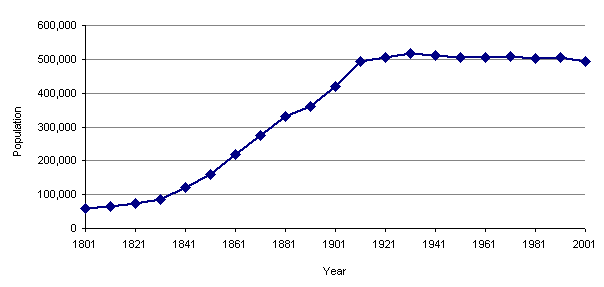
Population over time of the current remit of Durham County Council between 1801 and 2001

Year	Population	Year	Population	Year	Population
1801	59,765	1871	273,671	1941	511,590
1811	64,781	1881	329,985	1951	504,943
1821	74,366	1891	360,028	1961	506,070
1831	86,267	1901	419,782	1971	509,307
1841	121,602	1911	492,503	1981	501,639
1851	161,035	1921	503,946	1991	505,625
1861	217,353	1931	518,581	2001	493,470
Source: A Vision of Britain through Time.

At the 2001 Census, Easington and Derwentside districts had the highest proportion (around 99%) in the county council area of resident population who were born in the UK. 13.2% of the county council area's residents rate their health as not good, the highest proportion in England.

96.6% of County Durham's residents are White British, with other white groups making up a further 1.6% of the population. Around 77% of the county's population are Christian whilst 22% have no religion, and around 1% come from other religious communities. These figures exclude around 6% of the population who did not wish to state their religion.

As at 2001, Chester-le-Street district has the lowest number of available jobs per working-age resident (0.38%).

=== 1900s ===
Since the Local Government Act 1972 historic county boundaries now lie within other administrative counties. These include:

Tyne and Wear	South Tyneside, City of Sunderland and metropolitan borough of Gateshead	administratively removed in 1974
North Riding of Yorkshire	Small number of settlements south of the Tees, such as Startforth,	administratively added to county control in 1974.
Cleveland county	Hartlepool borough	administratively removed from historic county control in 1974, added to ceremonial county control in 1996.
Cleveland county	Stockton-on-Tees (North Tees) borough	Two previous separate administrative partial removals from historic county control in 1968 and 1974, added to ceremonial county control in 1996.

=== 1800s ===
Throughout the 1800s exclaves, of the historic county, each were given back to surrounding shires and lands they were closer associated with:

East Riding of Yorkshire	Howdenshire
North Riding of Yorkshire (now North Yorkshire)	Allertonshire
Northumberland	Bedlingtonshire, Islandshire (included Berwick-upon-Tweed)

== Economy ==
=== Economic output ===
The chart and table summarise unadjusted gross value added (GVA) in millions of pounds sterling for County Durham across 3 industries at current basic prices from 1995 to 2004.

	Gross Value Added (GVA) (£m)		
	1995	2000	2004
Agriculture, hunting and forestry	45	33	48
Industry, including energy and construction	1,751	1,827	1,784
Service activities	2,282	2,869	3,455
Total	4,078	4,729	5,288
UK	640,416	840,979	1,044,165

=== Businesses ===
Phileas Fogg snacks are made by the United Biscuits subsidiary KP Snacks in Consett on the Number One Industrial Estate. Nearby CAV Aerospace make ice protection systems for aircraft. Thomas Swan, an international chemicals company, is in Crookhall. The Explorer Group, who own Elddis, make caravans at Delves. The LG Philips Displays cathode-ray tube factory at Carrville, Durham was the second largest employer in the north east after Nissan, before the company went bankrupt in 2006. Northumbrian Water is in Pity Me, Framwellgate Moor. Esh Group is a large construction company based south of Durham in Bowburn. Schmitz Cargobull UK is the UK's biggest trailer manufacturer, notably for refrigerated trailers, and is based at Harelaw near the Pontop Pike mast.

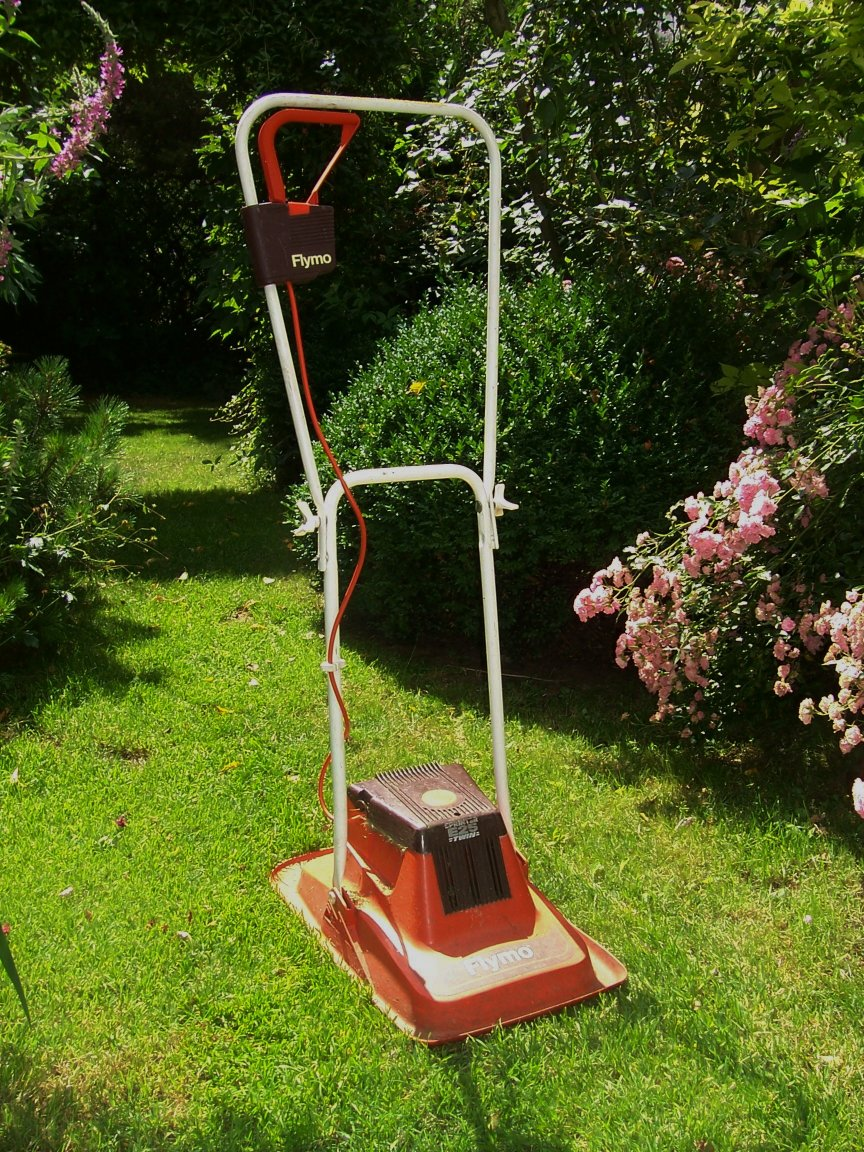
Flymos are made in Newton Aycliffe

Black & Decker and Electrolux had large factories at Spennymoor, but moved production overseas. Thorn Lighting of the Zumtobel Lighting Group are on the Green Lane Industrial Estate at Spennymoor. Since 2007 RF Micro Devices (RFMD) have made electronic wafers on the Heighington Lane Business Park at Newton Aycliffe, on the site formerly owned by Fujitsu. Slightly to the north, TKA Tallent make automotive axles and chassis components. Husqvarna-Flymo, formerly owned by Electrolux, are on the Aycliffe Industrial Estate, where the world's first hover mower was built in 1965. In West Auckland, Potters Europe make road reflectors. GlaxoSmithKline has a site at Barnard Castle that makes pharmaceuticals.

NSK make ball bearings on the North West Industrial Estate at Peterlee, and GWA Group subsidiary Gliderol UK build garage doors. Mecaplast Group UK produce automotive components on the Low Hills Industrial Estate in Easington Village near Peterlee. Reckitt Benckiser make cough syrup and indigestion remedies at Shotton, near Peterlee until 2014. Walkers Crisps have a site north of Peterlee.

== Culture ==
=== Mining and heavy industry ===
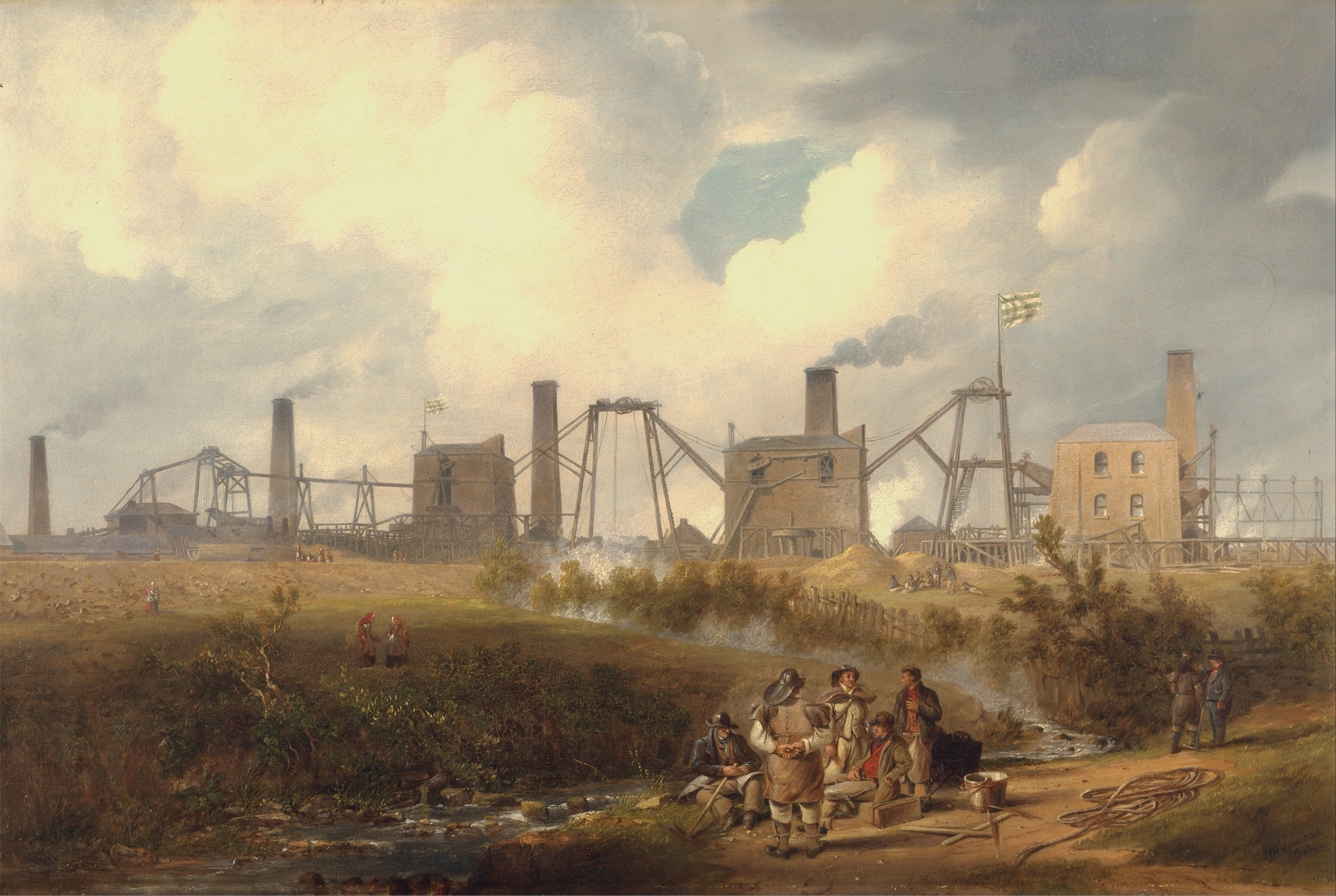
John Wilson Carmichael A View of Murton Colliery near Seaham, County Durham, 1843

A substantial number of colliery villages were built throughout the county in the nineteenth century to house the growing workforce, which included large numbers of migrant workers from the rest of the UK. Sometimes the migrants were brought in to augment the local workforce but, in other cases, they were brought in as strike breakers, or "blacklegs". Tens of thousands of people migrated to County Durham from Cornwall (partly due to their previous experience of tin mining) between 1815 and the outbreak of the First World War, so much so that the miners' cottages in east Durham called "Greenhill" were also known locally as "Cornwall", and Easington Colliery still has a Cornish Street. Other migrants included people from Northumberland, Cumberland, South Wales, Scotland and Ireland. Coal mining had a profound effect on trade unionism, public health and housing, as well as creating a related culture, language, folklore and sense of identity that still survives today.

The migrants also were employed in the railway, ship building, iron, steel and roadworking industries, and the pattern of migration continued, to a lesser extent, up until the 1950s and 1960s. Gateshead was once home to the fourth-largest Irish settlement in England, Consett's population was 22% Irish and significant numbers of Irish people moved to Sunderland, resulting in the city hosting numerous events on St. Patrick's Day due to the Irish heritage.

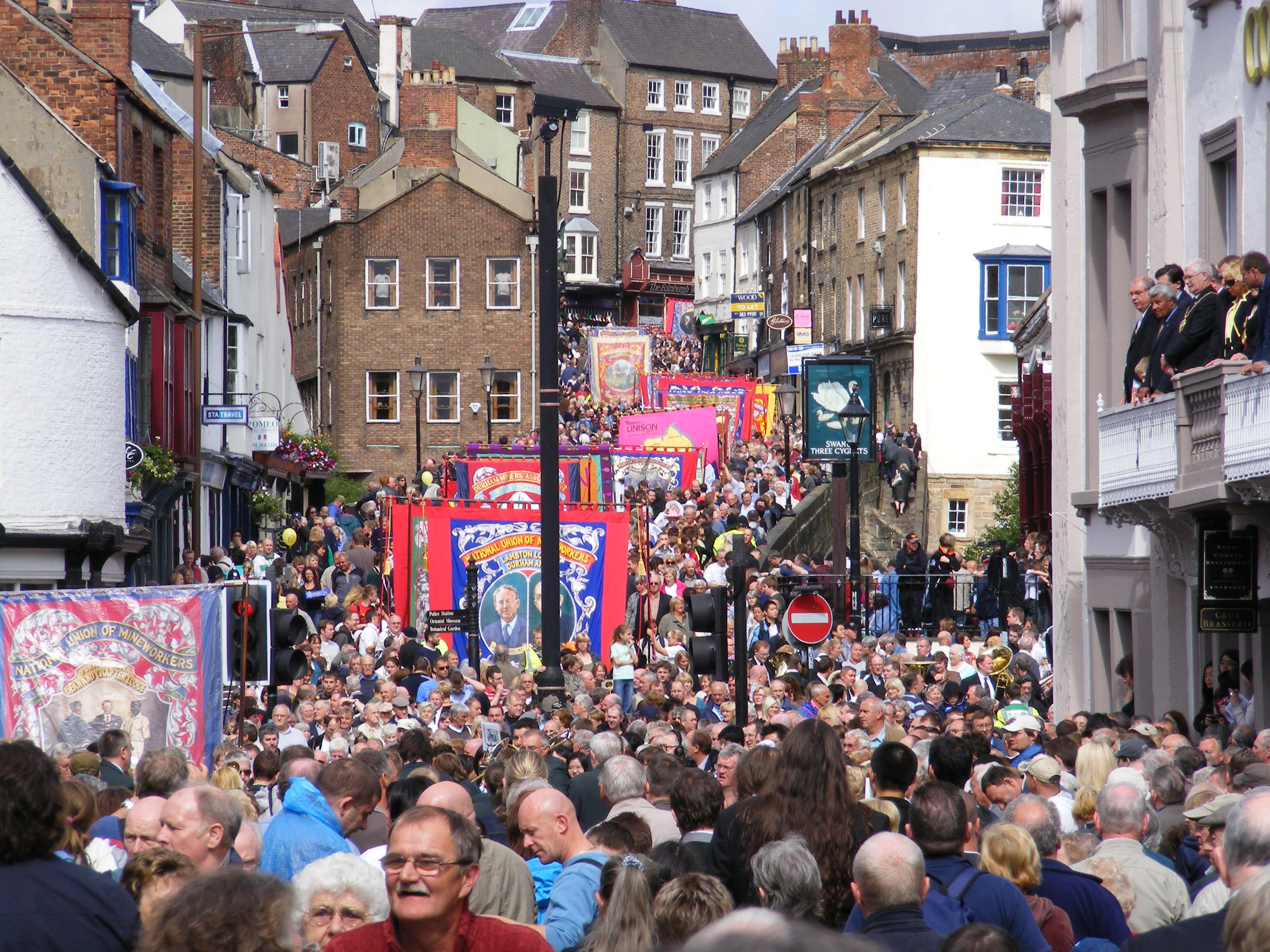
Durham Miners' Gala 2008

The culture of coal mining found expression in the Durham Miners' Gala, which was first held in 1871, developed around the culture of trade unionism. Coal mining continued to decline and pits closed. The 1984–1985 United Kingdom miners' strike involved many miners across the county. Today no deep-coal mines exist in the county and numbers attending the Miners' Gala decreased over the period between the end of the strike and the 21st century. However recent years have seen numbers significantly grow, and more banners return to the Gala each year as former colliery communities restore or replicate former banners to march at the Gala parade.

=== Art ===
In 1930, the Spennymoor Settlement (otherwise known as the Pitman's Academy) opened. The settlement, initially funded by the Pilgrim Trust, aimed to encourage people to be neighbourly and participate in voluntary social service. The settlement operated during the Great Depression, when unemployment was widespread and economic deprivation rife; Spennymoor was economically underprivileged. The settlement provided educational and social work, as well as hope; this included providing unemployed miners with on outlet for their creativity, a poor person's lawyer service, the town's first library and the Everyman Theatre. The output included paintings, sewing, socially-significant plays, woodwork and sculptures. Several members went on to win adult scholarships at Oxford University when such a route would normally be closed to the underprivileged. Former members include artists Norman Cornish and Tom McGuinness, writer Sid Chaplin and journalist Arnold Hadwin (1929–2011). The Spennymoor Settlement at its home in the Everyman Theatre (Grade II listed) is still operating, administered by the current trustees, offering community events and activities, including Youth Theatre Group, an Art Group and various classes, as well as offering community accommodation facilities.

Several Durham miners have been able to turn their former mining careers into careers in art. For example, Tom Lamb, as well as the aforementioned Tom McGuinness and Norman Cornish. Their artworks depict scenes of life underground, the streets in which they lived and the people they loved.

In 2017, The Mining Art Gallery opened in Bishop Auckland in a building that was once a bank. Part of the Auckland Project, the gallery includes the work of artists from within County Durham and beyond, including such other North-Eastern mining artists as Robert Olley, as well as contributions from outside the region. It features three permanent areas and a temporary exhibition area; the gallery's Gemini Collection includes 420 pieces of mining art. Much of the artwork was donated, by Dr Robert McManners and Gillian Wales, for example.

In 2019, 100 years after his birth, a permanent tribute to the work of the artist Norman Stansfield Cornish MBE was opened within the Town Hall, and a Cornish Trail around the town was established to include areas of the town depicted in Cornish's artwork.

=== Music ===
As with neighbouring Northumberland, County Durham has a rich heritage of Northumbrian music, dating back from the Northumbrian Golden Age of the 7th and 8th centuries. Bede made references to harp-playing, and abundant archeological evidence has been found of wooden flutes, bone flutes, panpipes, wooden drums and lyres (a six-string form of harp). North-East England has a distinctive folk music style that has drawn from many other regions, including southern Scotland, Ireland and the rest of northern England, that has endured stably since the 18th century. Instruments played include, in common with most folk music styles, stringed instruments such as the guitar and fiddle, but also the Northumbrian smallpipe, which is played and promoted by people including the Northumbrian Pipers' Society throughout the North East, including County Durham, with the society having an active group in Sedgefield. Contemporary folk musicians include Jez Lowe and Ged Foley.

In 2018, The Arts Council funded the Stories of Sanctuary project in the city of Durham. The project aims to assist people living in the city to share their stories about seeking sanctuary in the North East through photography, stories, poetry and music. The art is based on a history of sanctuary in Durham, from St Cuthbert's exile, through to the miners' strike of 1984, and to refugees escaping civil war in the Middle East. The music produced as part of the project includes contributions from singer-songwriter Sam Slatcher and viola player Raghad Haddad from the National Syrian Orchestra.

Other notable performers/songwriters who were born or raised in the county include Paddy McAloon, Eric Boswell, Jeremy Spencer, Alan Clark, Martin Brammer, Robert Blamire, Thomas Allen, Zoe Birkett, John O'Neill, Karen Harding and Courtney Hadwin.

=== Flag ===
County Durham flag

County Durham has an unofficial flag, registered with the vexillological charity the Flag Institute on 21 November 2013. The flag consists of St Cuthbert's cross counterchanged with the county's blue and gold colours.

Katie, Holly and James Moffatt designed the flag and entered their design into a competition launched by campaigner Andy Strangeway, who spoke of the flag as "free, public symbol for all to use, especially on 20th March each year, which is not only County Durham Day but also St Cuthbert’s birthday” (20 March is actually the date of Cuthbert's death).

== Education ==
=== University ===
Durham University is based in Durham city and is sometimes held to be the third oldest university in England. Teesside University has a campus in Darlington.

=== Colleges ===
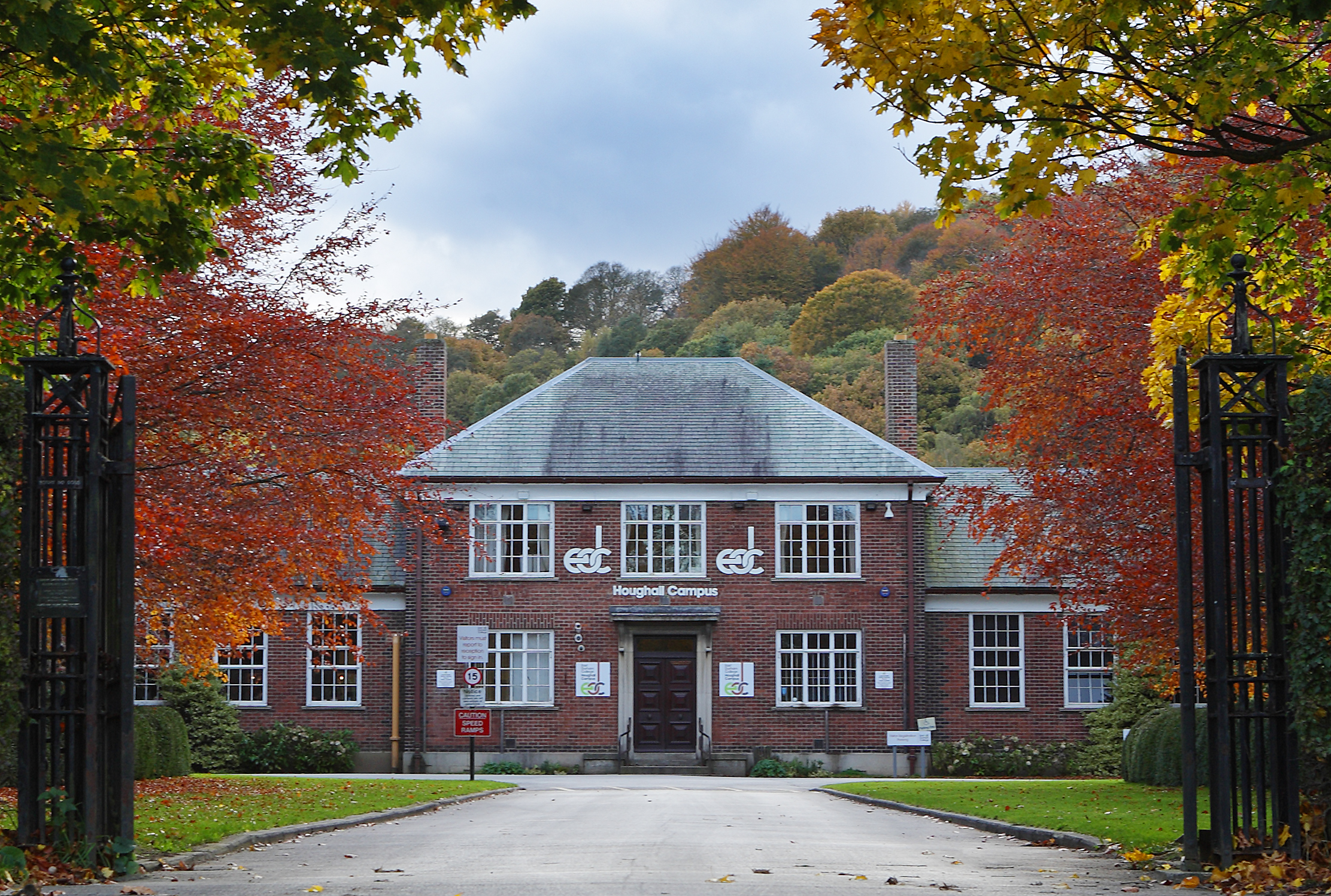
East Durham College Houghall Campus

- Bede Sixth Form College, Billingham
- Bishop Auckland College
- Carmel College Sixth Form, Darlington
- Darlington College
- Derwentside College, Consett
- Durham Sixth Form Centre, Durham
- East Durham College, Durham and Peterlee
- Hartlepool College of Further Education
- Hartlepool Sixth Form College
- New College Durham, Durham
- Queen Elizabeth Sixth Form College, Darlington
- Stockton Sixth Form College
- St Bede’s Catholic Academy and Sixth Form College Lanchester

== Places of interest ==
Key
	Abbey/Priory/Cathedral
Accessible open space	Accessible open space
	Amusement/Theme Park
	Castle
Country Park	Country Park
	English Heritage
	Forestry Commission
Heritage railway	Heritage railway
Historic house	Historic House
Places of Worship	Places of Worship
Museum (free) Museum	Museum (free/not free)
National Trust	National Trust
	Theatre
	Zoo

- Apollo Pavilion, Peterlee, concrete art designed by Victor Pasmore in 1969.
- The Barnard Castle, a castle the adjoining town having a Butter Market folley
- Beamish Museum, Stanley, open air living museum
- Binchester Roman Fort
- Bowes Museum, Barnard Castle
- The Castle Eden, a castle with adjoining village which is famous for the Castle Eden Brewery.
- Castle Eden Dene Nature reserve, coal mining heritage.
- Causey Arch, near Stanley
- Crook Hall and Gardens
- Fox & Parrot Wood
- Hamsterley Forest
- Hardwick Hall Country Park, Sedgefield
- High Force and Low Force waterfalls, on the River Tees
- Lambton Castle
- North of England Lead Mining Museum, including Killhope Wheel, Cowshill
- Locomotion railway museum, in Shildon
- Longovicium ruin auxiliary Roman Fort, Lanchester
- Raby Castle, Staindrop
- Seaham Hall
- Sedgefield Racecourse, the town has a notable Cosin woodwork in St Edmund's Church.
- Whitworth Hall, Spennymoor
- Tanfield Railway
- Ushaw College, Catholic Seminary of great religious heritage.
- Weardale Railway, at Stanhope, County Durham, Wolsingham and Bishop Auckland
- Bishop Auckland
  - Kynren, theme park and night show depicting British History
  - The Auckland Castle
  - Gothic Revival style Bishop Auckland Town Hall
- Escomb Church, near Bishop Auckland
- Durham City
  - Durham Castle and Cathedral, a World Heritage Site
  - Durham Light Infantry Museum, Aykley Heads
  - Durham University Oriental Museum, Asian artefacts and information.
  - Finchale Priory
- Darlington Borough
  - Head of Steam
  - South Park, Darlington
  - Rockcliffe Hall, Hurworth
  - Darlington Market Hall
- Hartlepool Borough
  - Ward Jackson Park
  - National Museum of the Royal Navy, Hartlepool
  - Heugh Battery Museum
  - Hartlepool Art Gallery
- Stockton-on-Tees Borough
  - Preston Hall and Preston Park, museum
  - Ropner Park
  - Stockton Globe Theatre
  - Stockton ARC Theatre
  - Tees Barrage International White Water Course

=== Gallery ===
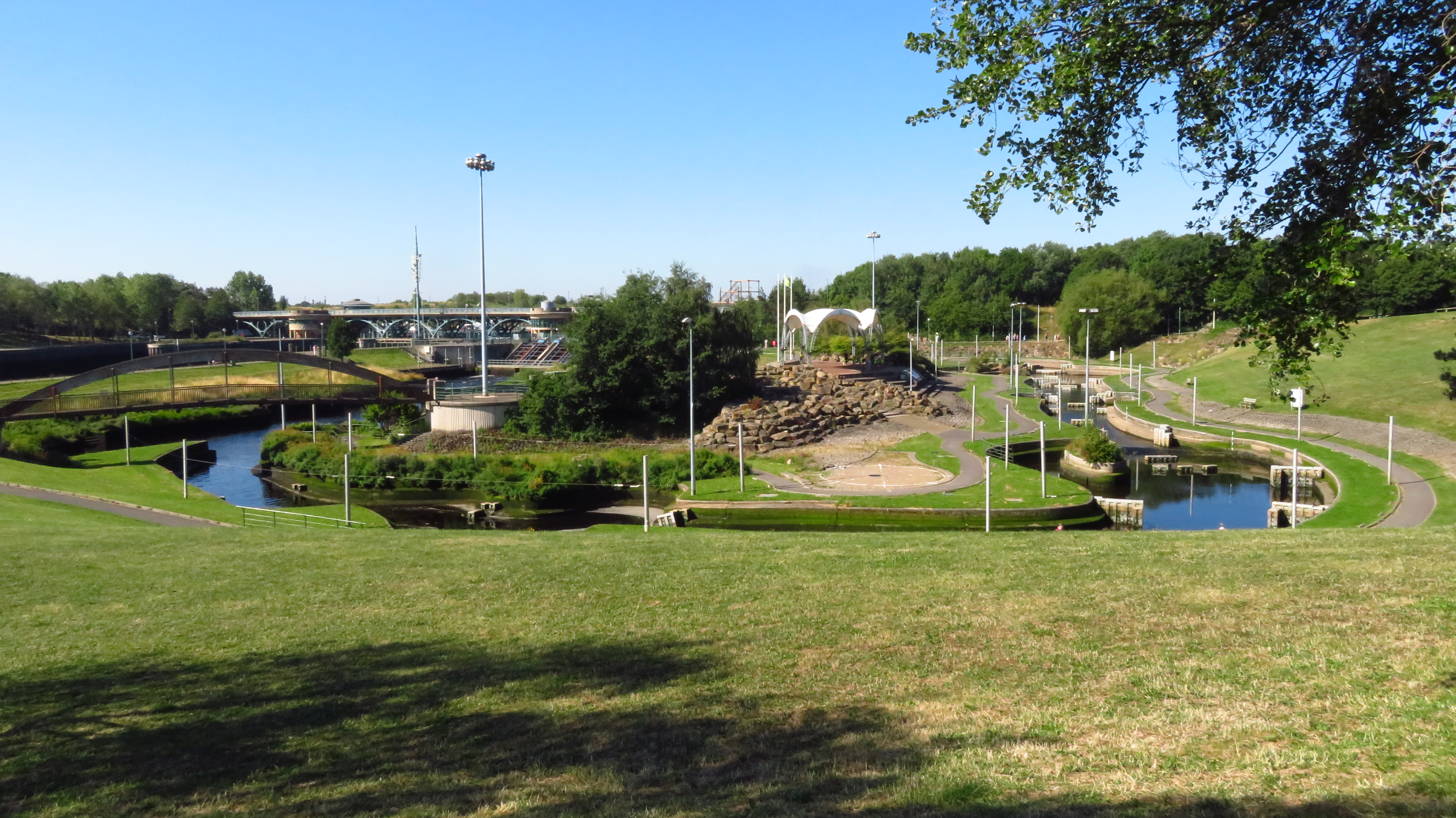
Tees Barrage International White Water Course

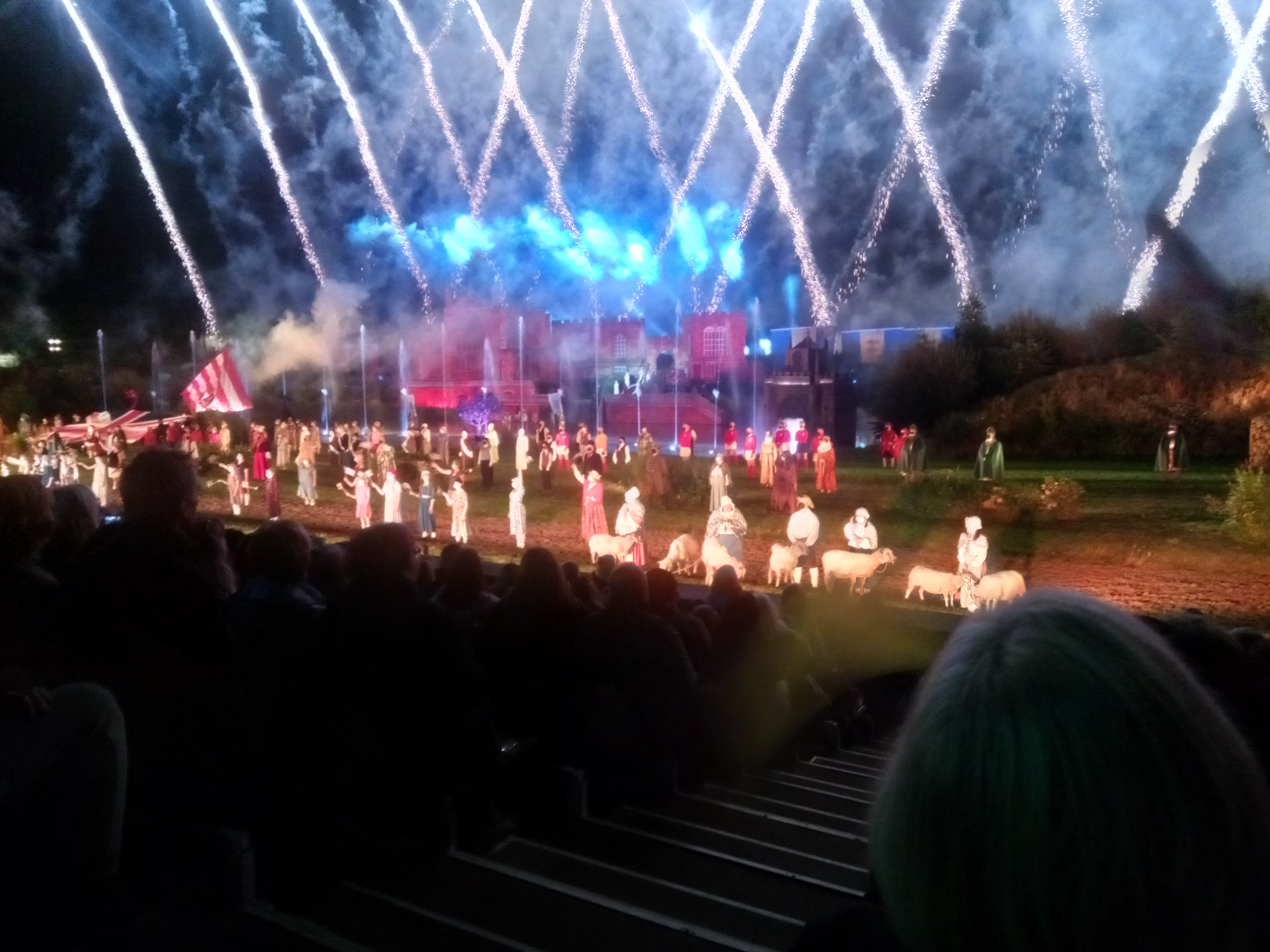
Kynren

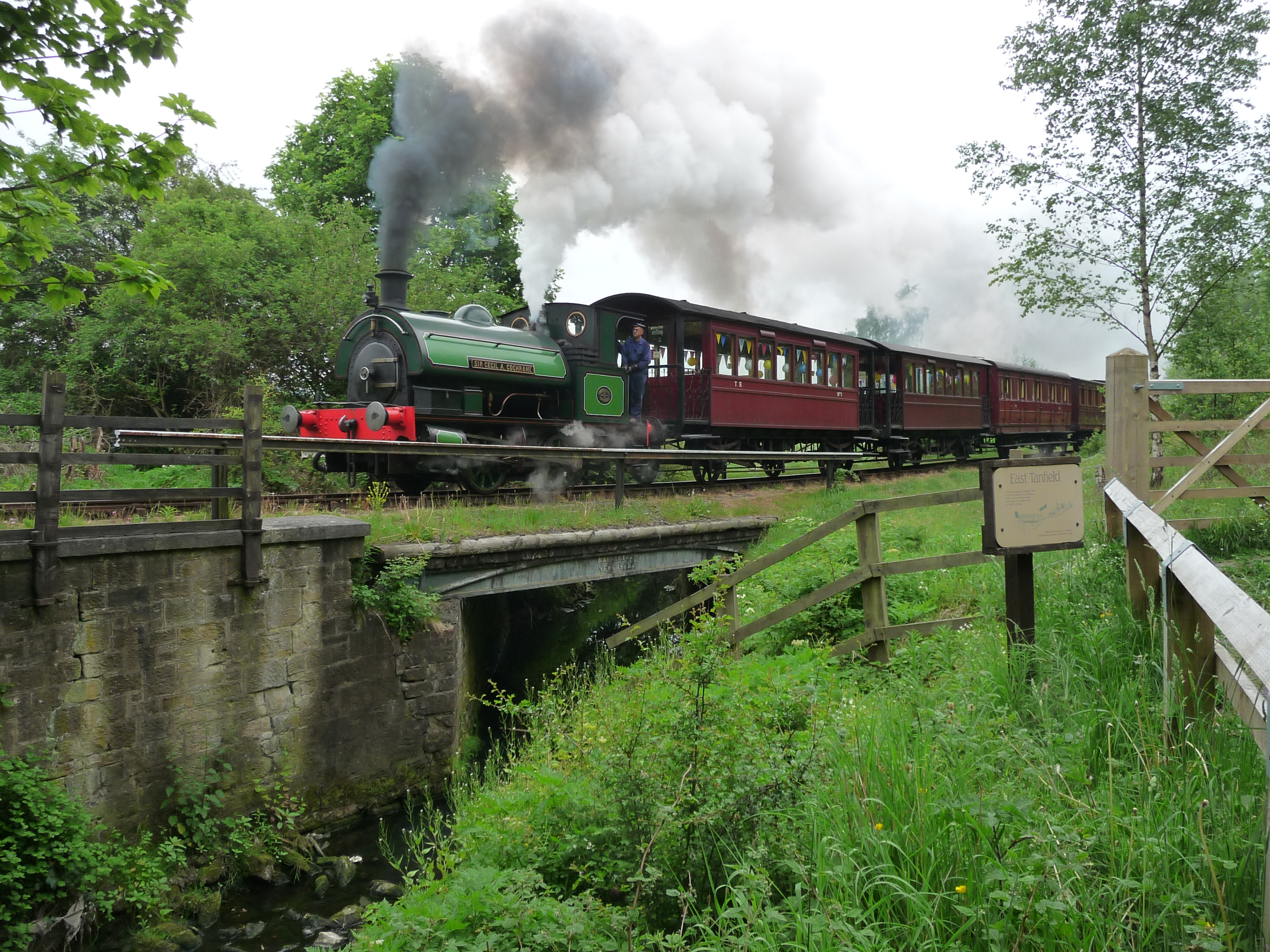
Tanfield Railway

Beamish Museum

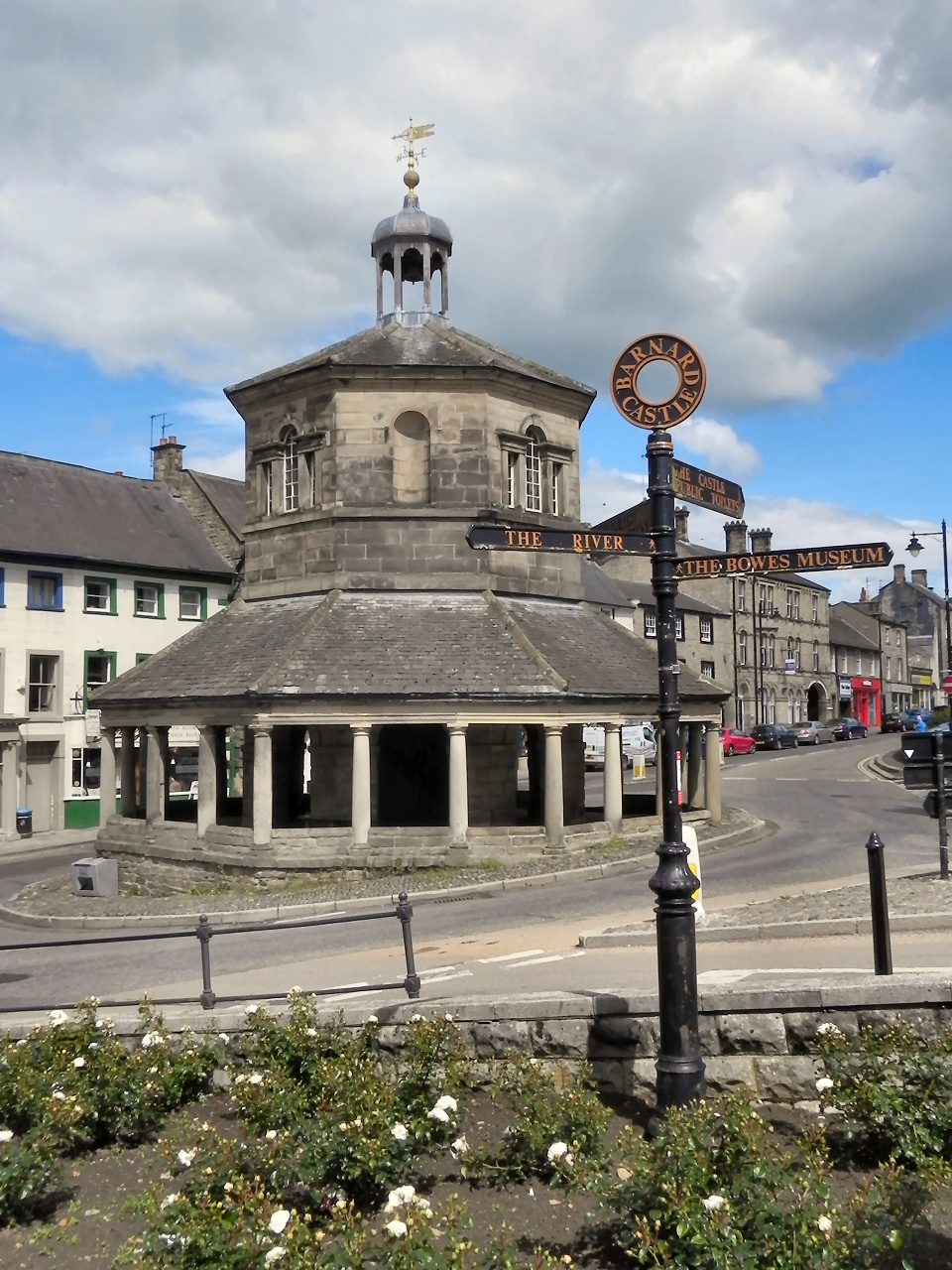
Butter Market, Barnard Castle

== See also ==
- List of Lord Lieutenants of Durham
  - List of Deputy Lieutenants of Durham
- Custos Rotulorum of Durham – Keepers of the Rolls
- List of High Sheriffs of Durham
- County Durham (UK Parliament constituency) – Historical list of MPs for County Durham constituency
- List of English and Welsh endowed schools (19th century)#Durham
