= Fox & Parrot Wood =

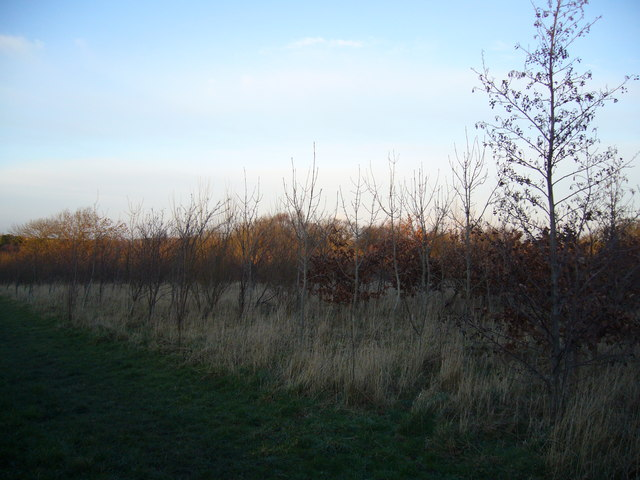

- Location within County Durham
- Interactive map of Fox & Parrot Wood

Geography
- Location: County Durham, England
- OS grid: NZ227512
- Coordinates: 54.855°N 1.647°W
- Area: 13.4 hectares (33.1 acres)

Administration
- Authority: Woodland Trust

Fox & Parrot Wood is a broadleaf woodland in County Durham, England, about 4 miles (6 km) west of Chester-le-Street. It is situated just north of the B6313 road, near the village of Craghead. The wood forms part of the Great North Forest, which is one of England's community forests, and is adjacent to Twizell Wood, which lies to the north.

The wood was originally planted in 1998 as part of a joint project between the Woodland Trust and the Forestry Commission. Further planting took place in 2004. It now covers a total area of 13.4 hectares (33.1 acres) and is owned and managed by the Woodland Trust. As with other Woodland Trust woods, it is freely open to the public, with five access points.

The forest was named after Dr Fox, a local General Practitioner in the 1950s, who was known for his pet parrot.
