= Buttercross =

English medieval market cross

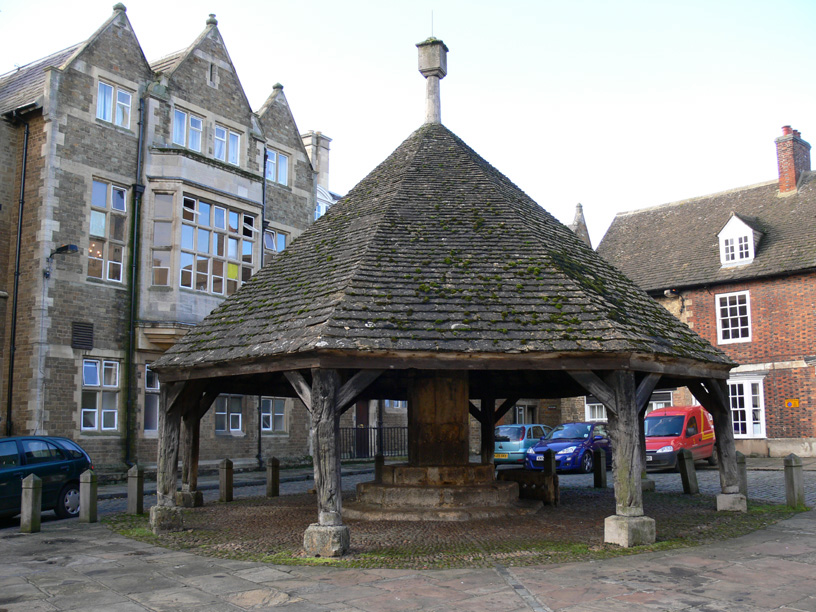
A buttercross in Oakham

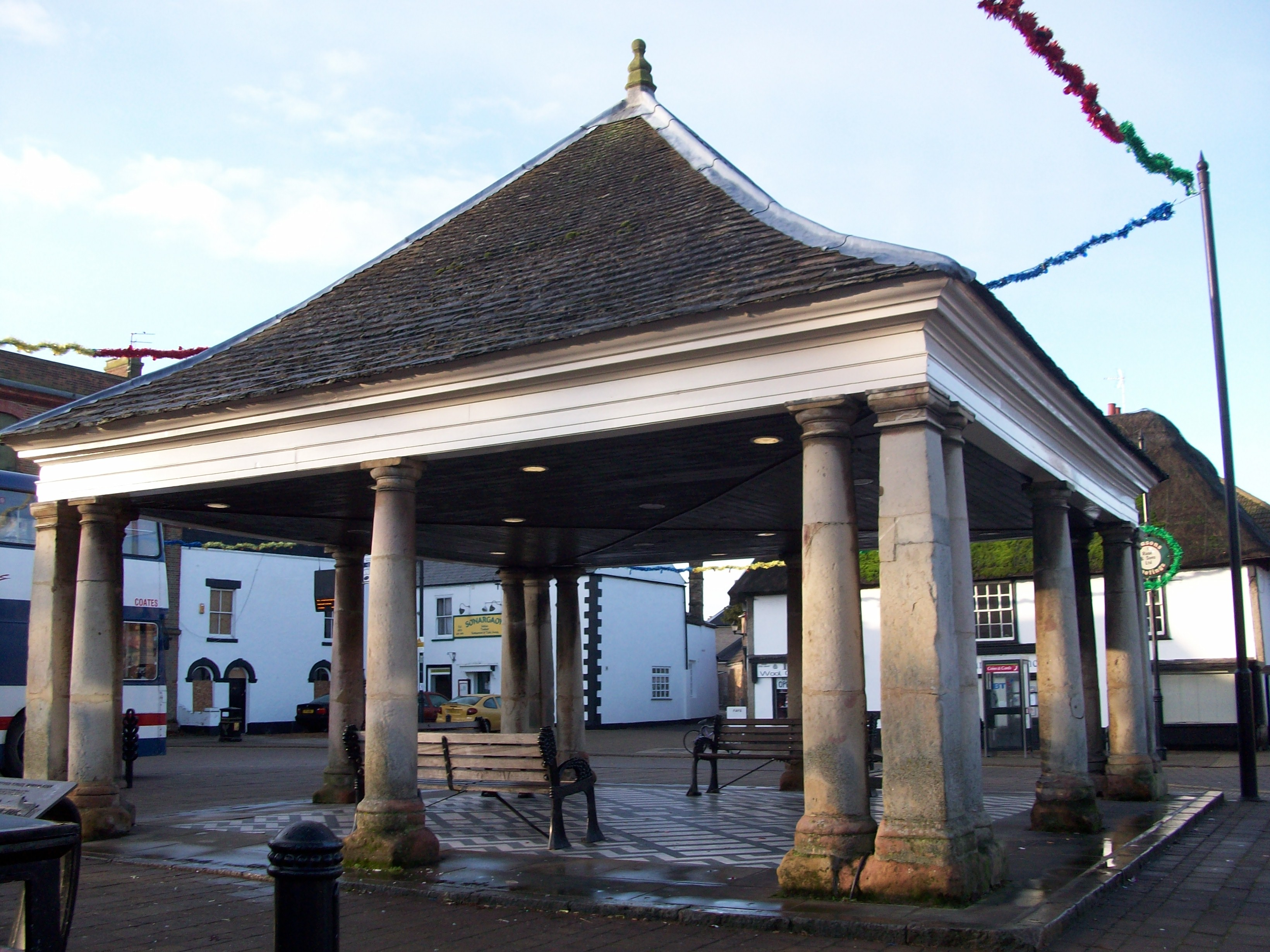
The 17th-century buttercross in Whittlesey, Cambridgeshire.

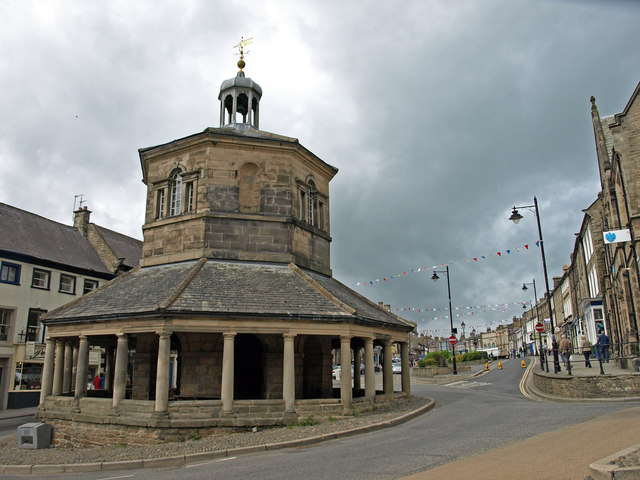
Barnard Castle Market Cross

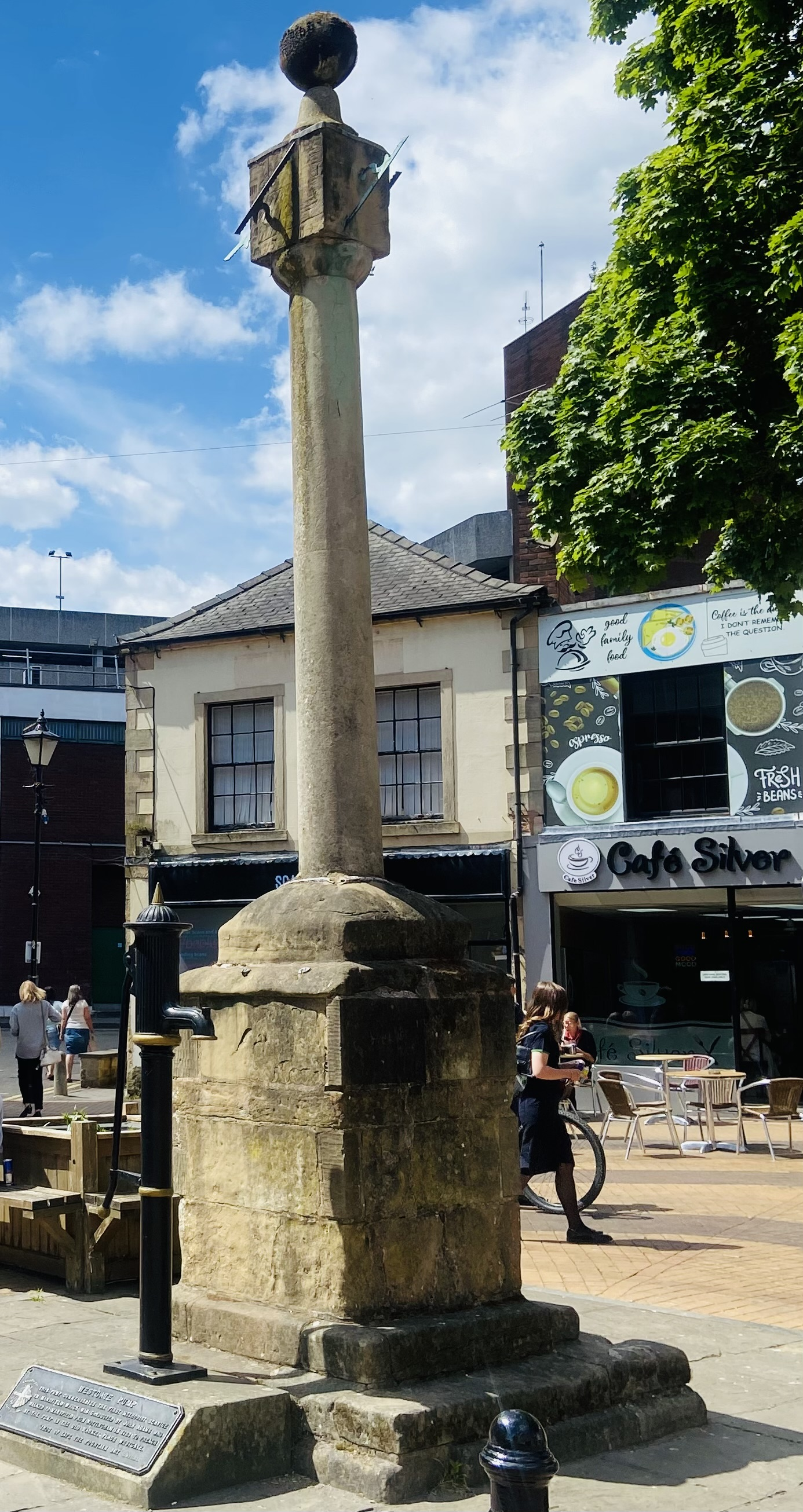
Buttercross in Mansfield, Nottinghamshire

A buttercross, butter cross or butter market cross is a type of market cross associated with English market towns and dating from medieval times. The name originates from the fact that the crosses were located in market places, where people would gather to buy locally produced butter and other dairy products. The fresh produce was laid out and displayed on the circular stepped bases of the cross.

Their design varies from place to place, but they are often covered by some type of roof to offer shelter. The roofs were generally added at a much later date than the construction of the original cross.

== Known buttercrosses ==
Examples from most parts of England include:

- Abbots Bromley, Staffordshire
- Alnwick, Northumberland
- Alveley, Shropshire
- Bainton, Cambridgeshire
- Barnard Castle, County Durham (Barnard Castle Market Cross)
- Barrow, Rutland
- Biddulph, Staffordshire
- Bingham, Nottinghamshire
- Bingley, West Yorkshire
- Brigg, Lincolnshire
- Bungay, Suffolk
- Burwell, Lincolnshire
- Castle Combe, Wiltshire
- Chagford, Devon
- Cheddar, Somerset (Market Cross, Cheddar)
- Chichester, West Sussex
- Chippenham, Wiltshire
- Corby Glen, Lincolnshire
- Cranwell, Lincolnshire
- Digby, Lincolnshire
- Dunster, Somerset (Dunster Butter Cross)
- Fishlake, Doncaster, South Yorkshire
- Grantham, Lincolnshire
- Gringley-on-the-Hill, Nottinghamshire
- Hallaton, Leicestershire
- Hooton Pagnell, South Yorkshire
- Kirkby Moorside, North Yorkshire
- Launceston, Cornwall
- Ludlow Buttercross, Ludlow, Shropshire
- Malmesbury, Wiltshire
- Maltby, South Yorkshire
- Mansfield, Nottinghamshire
- Market Drayton, Shropshire
- Marton, Lincolnshire
- Monk Bretton, South Yorkshire,
- Mountsorrel, Leicestershire
- Newport, Shropshire (Puleston Cross)
- Oakham Market Cross, Oakham, Rutland
- Otley, West Yorkshire
- Peterborough, Cambridgeshire
- Pontefract, West Yorkshire
- Preston, Lancashire
- Sarsden, Oxfordshire
- Salisbury, Wiltshire
- Scarborough, North Yorkshire (Butter Cross)
- Shepton Mallet, Somerset
- Somerton, Somerset
- Spilsby, Lincolnshire
- Stamfordham, Northumberland
- Swaffham, Norfolk
- Swinstead, Lincolnshire
- Tattershall, Lincolnshire
- Thatcham, Berkshire
- Tickhill, South Yorkshire
- Wainfleet All Saints, Lincolnshire
- Whittlesey, Cambridgeshire
- Winchester, Hampshire
- Witney, Oxfordshire
- Wymondham, Norfolk
