= Ropner Park =

Public park in County Durham, England

Ropner Park, Stockton on Tees
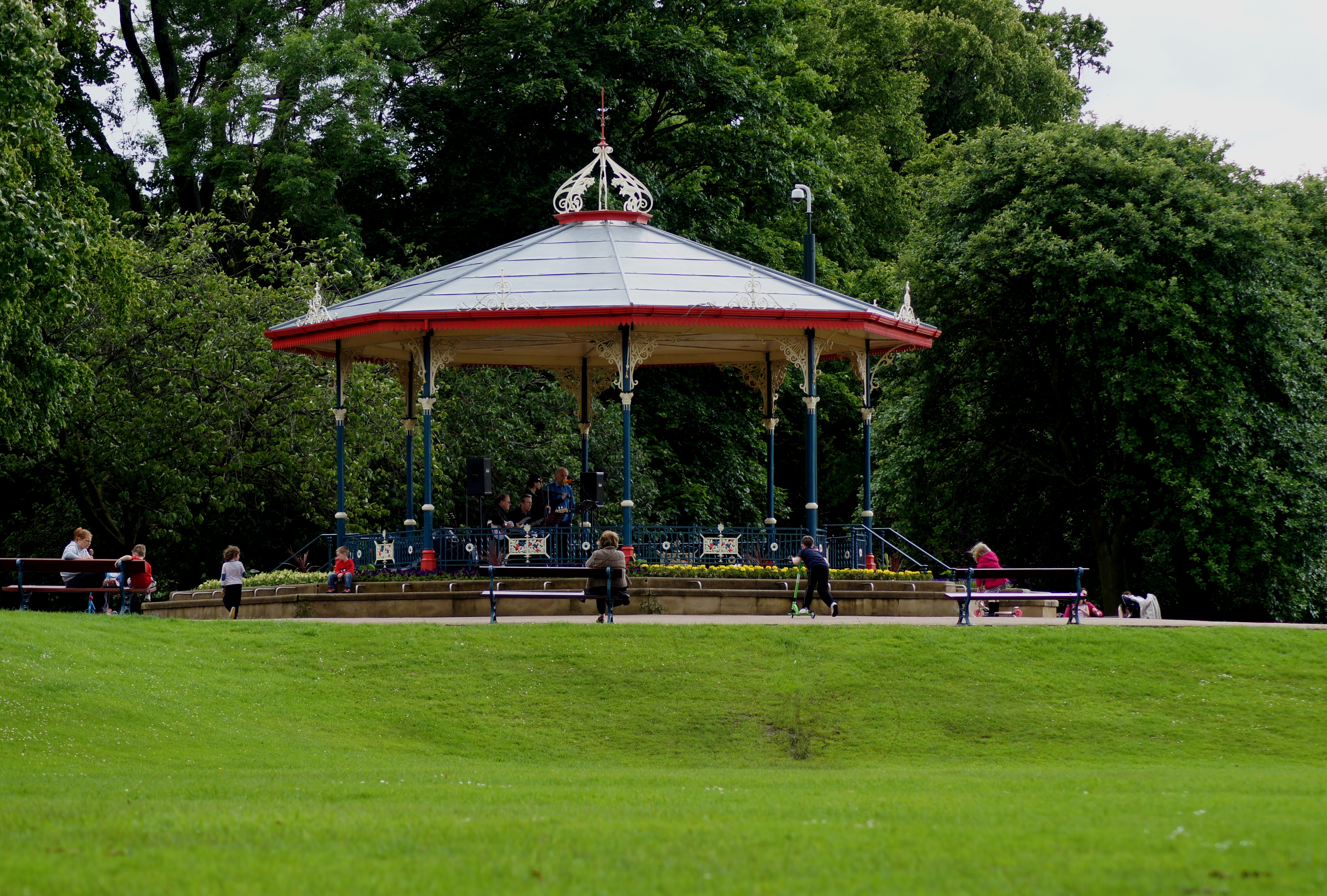
- The bandstand at Ropner Park

- Location within County Durham
- Type: Public park
- Location: Stockton-on-Tees, England
- Coordinates: 54°33′27″N 1°19′57″W
- Status: Open year round

Ropner Park is a free public park, located in Stockton-on-Tees, County Durham, England.

In June 1890 Major Robert Ropner offered a piece of land, known locally as Hartburn Fields to the people of Stockton which could be used as a public park, providing the local council would lay it out 'tastefully' and ‘keep it forever’. On 4 October 1893, Ropner Park was officially opened by the then Duke & Duchess of York. The ceremony involved the royals using an ornate key to open the Golden Gates.

After a century of regular use by the people of Stockton, the park was refurbished and renovated to its former glory between 2004 and 2007 by Stockton Borough Council, thanks to a £2.65m grant from the Heritage Lottery Fund. The Park is a roughly square site, with 20th-century railings along its road boundaries and is typically Victorian in style, with rockeries and floral displays. It has a tree-lined avenue which leads to an ornamental fountain and a pavilion with a veranda and also includes a new bandstand, based on the original design, a park ranger's office, bowling green, quoits green, tennis courts and a cafe, (run by the local charity, The Friends of Ropner Park). A large lake with islands dominates the lower part of the park and offers sanctuary to various species of water fowl and fish.

Seasonal fairs and occasional organised events are staged at the park throughout the year and various bands feature most Sunday afternoons during the summer months.

== Image gallery ==
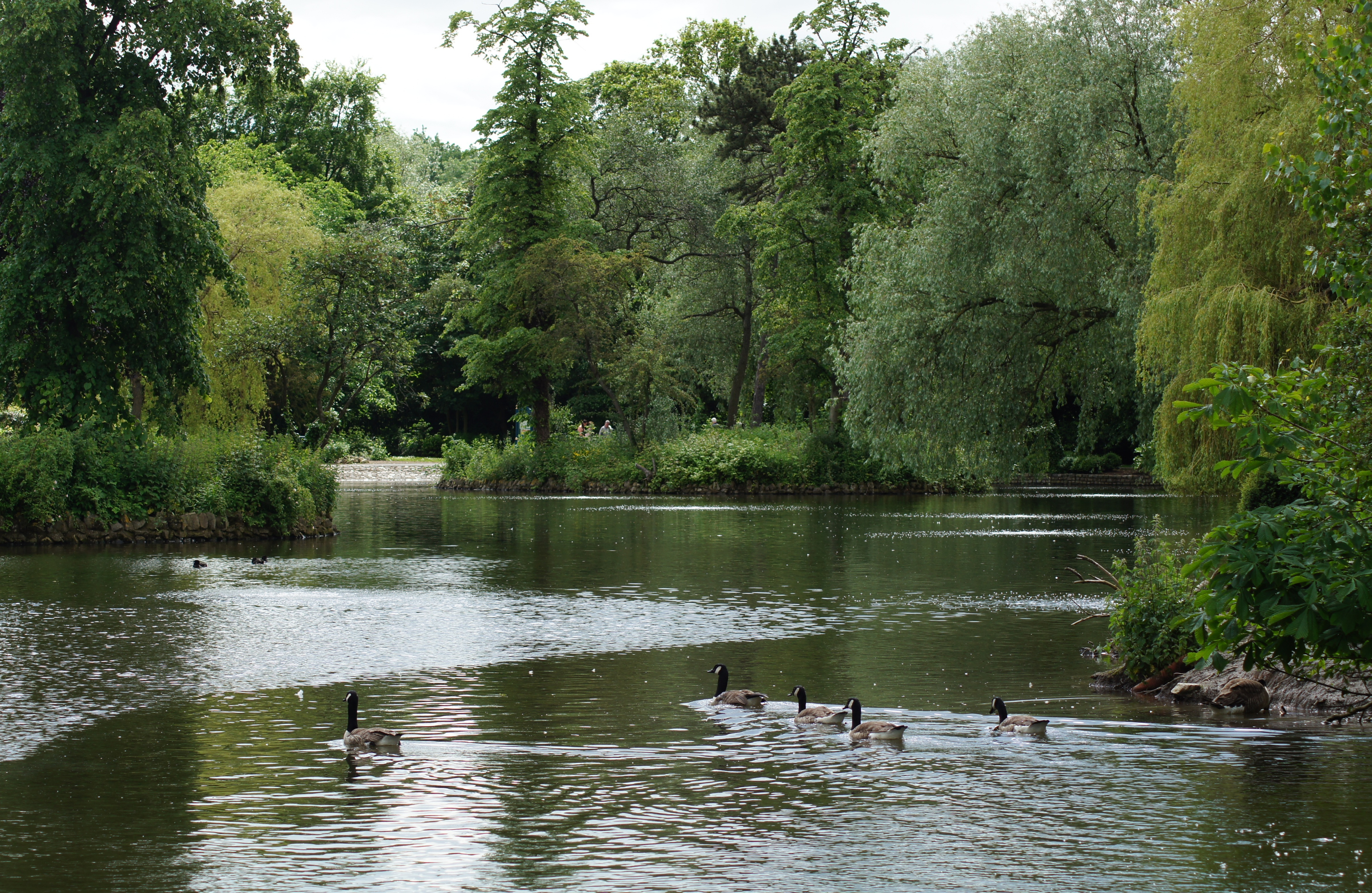
The lake

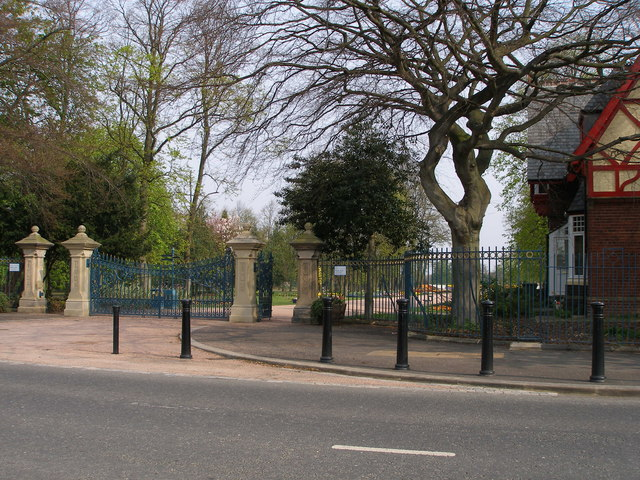
Gates to the park

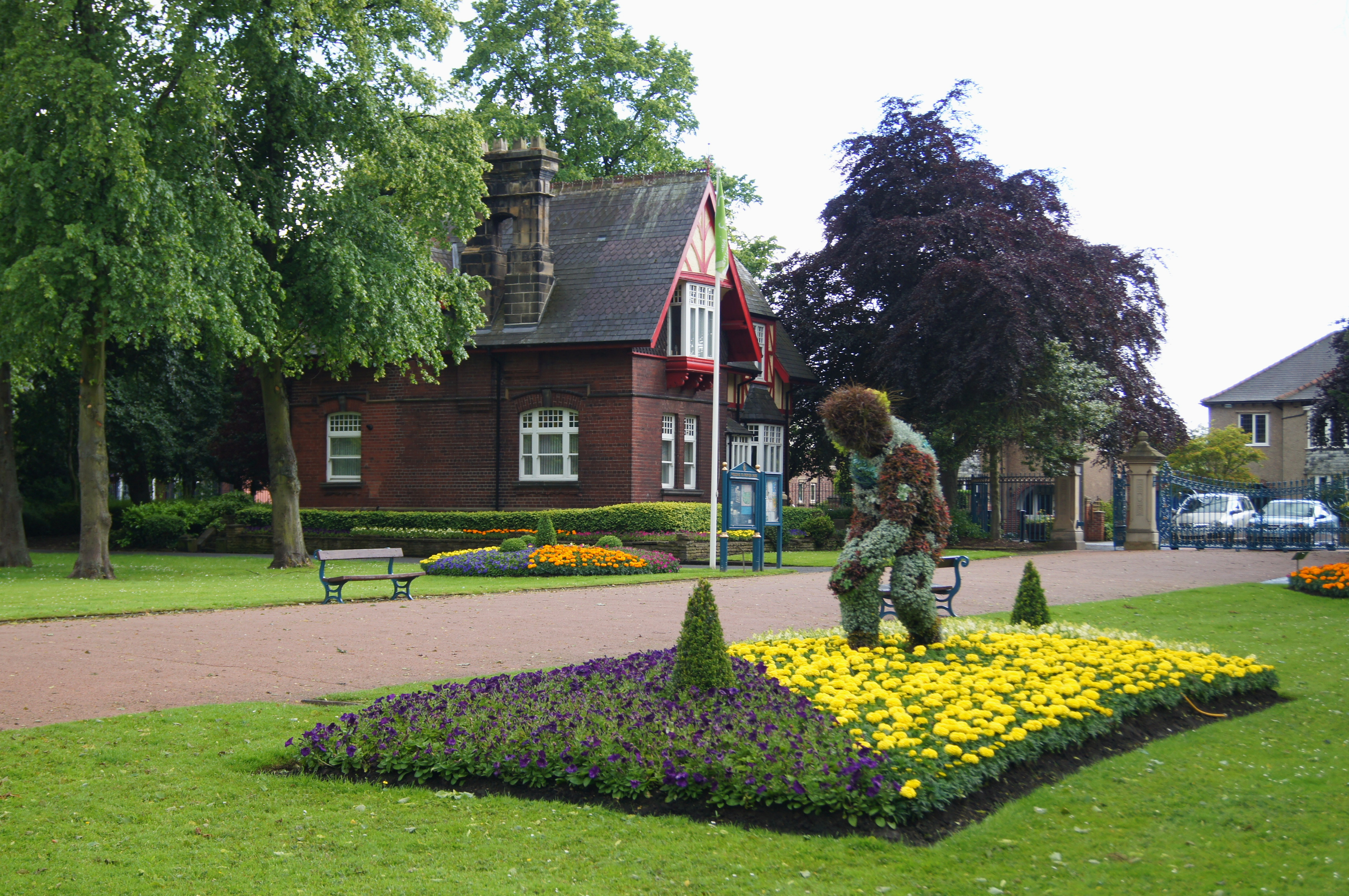
South Lodge at the Hartburn Lane entrance of Ropner Park

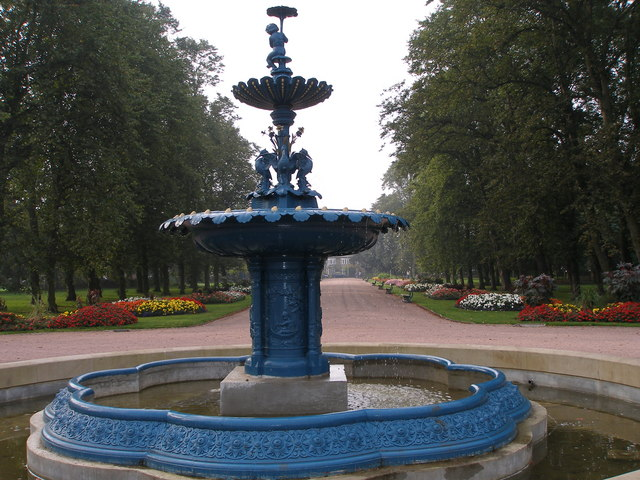
Fountain in the park

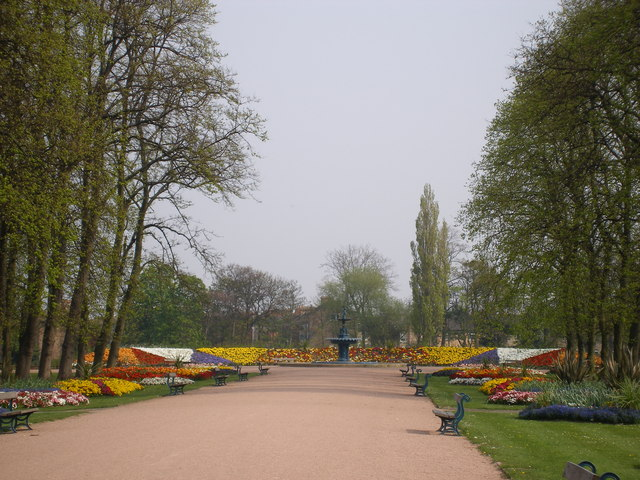
Flower display in the park

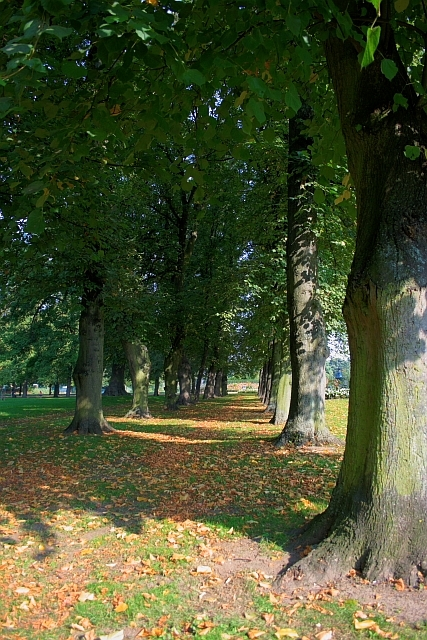
Avenue of trees in the park

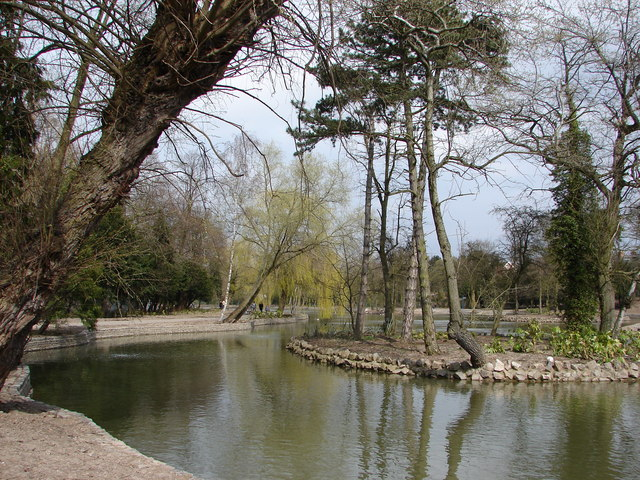
Lake

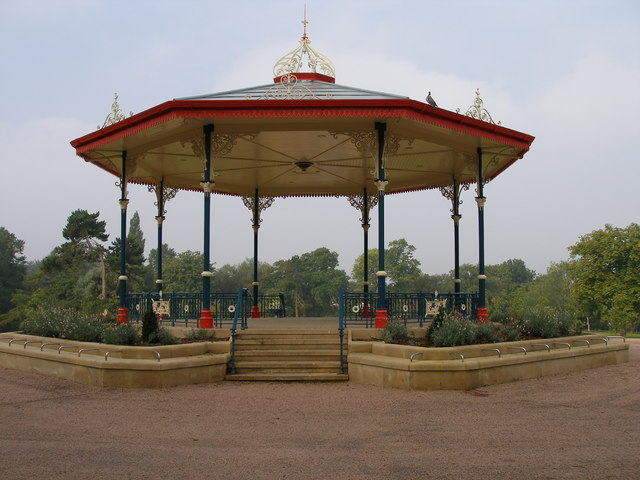
The bandstand in the park
