= Novares Group =

French manufacturer of car parts

- Industry: Automotive
- Founder: Charles Manni
- Key people: Pierre Boulet
- Products: plastic car parts
- Revenue: €700 million
- Number of employees: 6000 in 2016
- Website: novaresteam.com

The Novares Group is a French manufacturer of car parts. It was started in 1955 by Charles Manni, and was previously known as Mecaplast. Thierry Manni is chairman of the board, and the chief executive officer is Pierre Boulet. Mecaplast merged with Key Plastics in 2016, and in 2017 the combined firm changed its name to Novares.

== History ==
The company was started in 1955 by Charles Manni.

During the 2008 financial crisis, some workers were made redundant, and some plants were closed.

In August 2009 the company was nominated as a strategic supplier for PSA and Renault, and so benefitted from the Modernization Fund for Automobile Equipment Suppliers (FMEA) which increased the company’s capital by €55 million/33% stake. The Chennai plant in India was opened on June 3, 2010. A factory was opened in Zrenjanin, Serbia, in 2012.

In 2016, a majority holding in the company was sold to Equistone Partners Europe, a private investment company. Later that year, Mecaplast acquired and merged with Key Plastics, an American car parts company. About a year later the combined operation was renamed Novares. In 2018 the group arranged for its shares to be floated on the Euronext Paris exchange, but the flotation was cancelled.

In March 2020 the company received a cash injection af €45 million from its stockholders Equistone and BPI Paris. In April of that year it went into receivership.

On April 17, 2025 Novares was acquired by Global Technologies, a global industrial company.. However, the Novares owner may be in jeopardy as the bridge loan that paid for the overall Novares group came due recently and went unsettled, according to some of the people. In November of 2025, Novares said Patrick James (of First Brands who supported the bridge loan) no longer controls the company and that an independent agent is in charge for now.

== Figures ==
Revenue in M€/Workforce

Revenue/Workforce Comparison
Year	Revenue/Workforce
1995	175/1175
1998	223/2100
2000	286/2800
2002	580/5500
2005	820/7800
2007	759/6200
2009	570/5800
2010	643/5500
2011	692/5500
2012	662/5600
2013	661/6000
2015	734/5600
