= Market Cross, Barnard Castle =

Barnard Castle Market Cross
- Butter Market
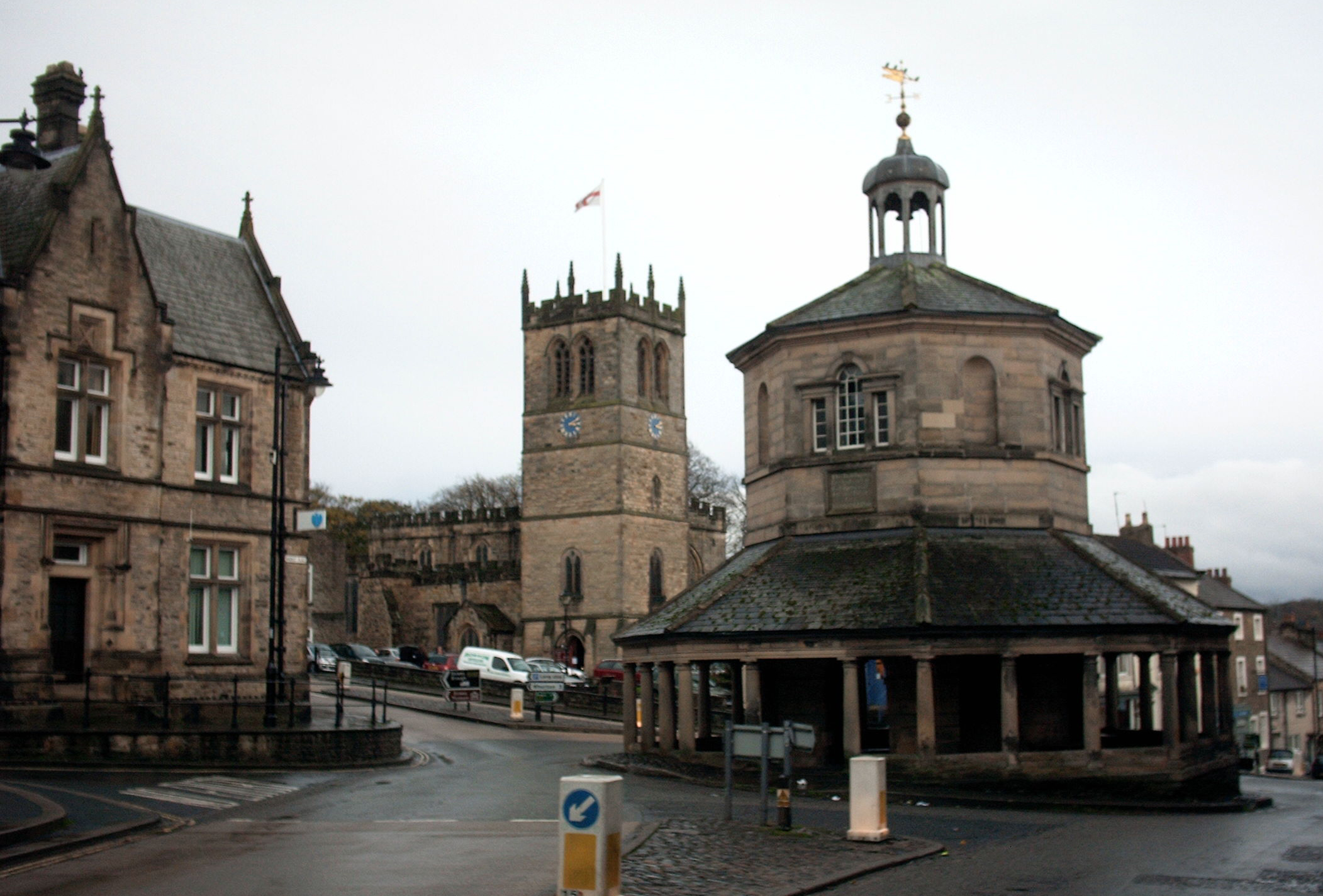
- The market cross in 2016, with St Mary's Parish Church in the background

- Location within County Durham
- 54.54222°N 1.92376°W
- Location: Barnard Castle, County Durham, England

History
- Built: 1747; 279 years ago

Listed Building – Grade I
- Official name: Market Cross
- Designated: 24 February 1950
- Reference no.: 1201323

Barnard Castle Market Cross (also known as the Butter Market or Break's Folley) is an octagonal construction in the market town of Barnard Castle, County Durham, England. It was built in 1747 by Thomas Breaks and is a Grade I listed building. It has had multiple uses including a courtroom, fire station, a gaol, a dairy market, a toll booth and a town hall.

The weather vane bears two holes, seemingly the result of musket shots being fired. A local legend tells of a match in 1804 between a soldier and gamekeeper to decide who was the better marksman. The soldier, named as Taylor of the Teesdale Volunteer Legion, and Cruddas, a gamekeeper from the Earl of Strathmore's estate at Streatlam, reputedly took aim at the weather vane from the doorway of the Turk's Head pub. Both men hit the mark.

== Gallery ==
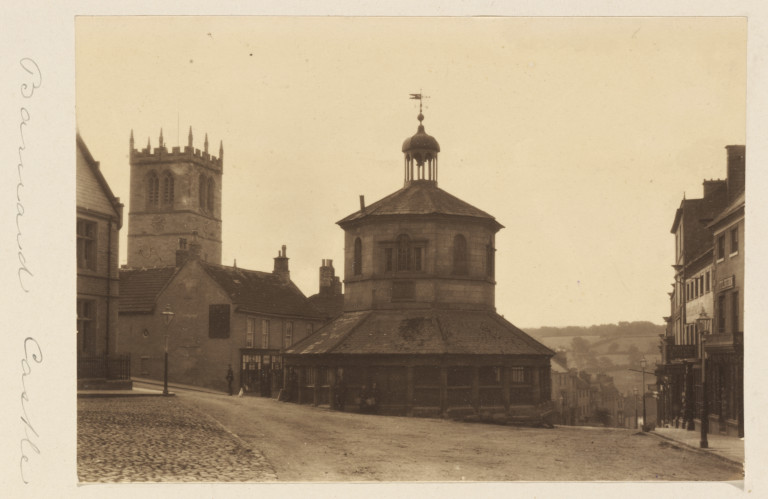
An 1893 view

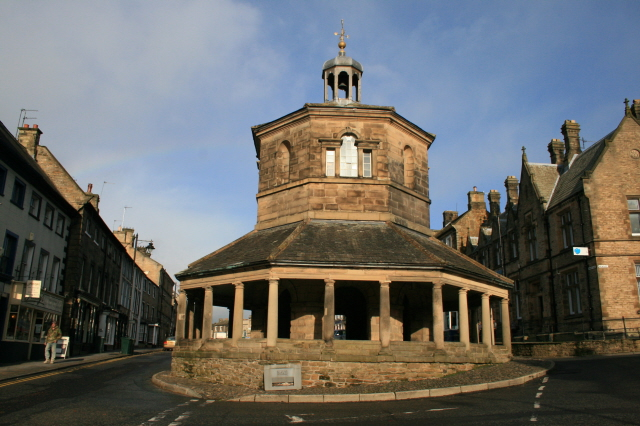
Close up

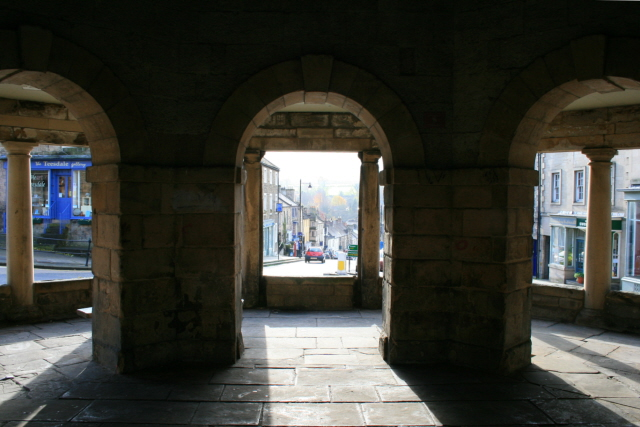
From the arcaded shelter
