= Hartlepool War Memorial =

The Hartlepool War Memorial may refer to the World War I and II war memorials in Hartlepool, County Durham, England:

- Redheugh Gardens War Memorial, on the headlands near the lighthouse
- West Hartlepool War Memorial, located in Victory Square
