= Hartlepool Mail =

Newspaper

- Type: Weekly newspaper
- Format: Tabloid
- Owner(s): National World
- Publisher: National World
- Editor: Gavin Ledwith
- Founded: 1877 (Northern Daily Mail)
- Language: English
- Headquarters: · North East Business & Innovation Centre, Westfield Enterprise Park East · Sunderland · SR5 2TA · England
- Circulation: 1,129 (as of 2023)
- Website: hartlepoolmail.co.uk

The Hartlepool Mail is a newspaper serving Hartlepool, England and the surrounding area.

== History ==
The paper was founded in Hartlepool in 1877 as The Northern Daily Mail and continued to be printed in the town until August 2006, when the printing staff were told they would be made redundant on 30 September.

The newspaper's owners, Johnston Press, decided it was in the interests of their business to move printing to Sunderland. On 16 July 2012, most of the reporting and sports staff moved to the headquarters of the Sunderland Echo. It was also decided later that year, that the printing plant in Sunderland would close with printing of the paper moving to Dinnington, near Sheffield as a result.

In 2015, the newspaper offices moved to Houghton le Spring alongside the Sunderland Echo and Shields Gazette. In May 2019, the office then moved to its Sunderland address at the BIC on the River Wear.

In December 2020, it was announced that former Mirror Group chief executive David Montgomery's group National World had acquired the paper's owners JPI Media for £10.2m.

On 12 March 2022, the paper printed its final daily edition. It was announced that the Mail was to become a weekly paper with a new copy being released every Thursday. As a result, its cover price increased from 90p to £1.30.

On 14 July 2023, the paper's editor revealed that the Mail had been banned from covering Hartlepool United home games for the foreseeable future. The club did not give the Mail any reason why they had been banned and the editor Gavin Ledwith described the decision as "unjust". The ban was overturned in February 2024.

== Peterlee Mail ==
The newspaper was formerly distributed in the Peterlee area under the Peterlee Mail name. Following a period of absence, this was replaced in June 2012 with the Peterlee Star, a new weekly paid-for paper retailing at 30p, produced by the Hartlepool editorial team.

== Circulation ==
From January to June 2011, the newspaper averaged a daily circulation of 14,198. Since then, the sales have dropped which has resulted in increases in the paper's cover price. In November 2013, the paper cost 60p while in April 2019, it costs 73p.

In December 2017, it had an average daily circulation of 4,183 making it the third lowest in regional newspaper daily sales in the UK. In December 2021, that figure dropped to 1,570 daily sales. When the paper first became a weekly edition, it's average circulation was 1,408 sales in December 2022.

The newspaper has a strong online presence and, in 2012, their website averaged 121,000 unique users a month.

== Other information ==
The newspaper is where sports journalist and TV presenter Jeff Stelling began his career. In April 2022, Stelling began writing a monthly column for the paper.

== See also ==
- Sunderland Echo
- Shields Gazette
- Johnston Press
- Hartlepool Life
