= High Tunstall College of Science =

Coordinates: 54.688°N 1.249°W

Location
- Elwick Road; West Park; Hartlepool, County Durham, TS26 0LQ; England

Information
- Type: Foundation school
- Local authority: Hartlepool Borough Council
- Department for Education URN: 111748 Tables
- Ofsted: Reports
- Headteacher: Mark Tilling
- Gender: Coeducational
- Age: 11 to 16
- Enrolment: 1195
- Website: https://htcs.org.uk/

High Tunstall College of Science (formerly High Tunstall Comprehensive School) is a coeducational secondary school located in the West Park area of Hartlepool, County Durham, England.

== History ==
The school was originally built to amalgamate Hartlepool Boys Technical School and Brierton Hill Technical High School for girls in 1973 after changes in the British schools system.

== Academics ==
The school is one of six secondary schools in the area. The headteacher is Mr Mark Tilling.

At the beginning of the 2005-2006 school year, the school was designated a specialist Science College with a secondary specialism of Maths.

== Blocks ==
The previous building High Tunstall School consisted of five main blocks ( A-B-C-D-E). Block A was used for cooking, block B was used for maths and science, block C was for citizenship, philosophy, ethics, history, geography and English. Block D was for arts and languages and block E was for world affairs. Block A was also used for administration. Two blocks are almost completely for teaching and another isolated block exists as a combination for the two. There is also one temporary block, which is used exclusively for teaching. The school also has a 20M x 5M swimming pool, a running track and several fields used mainly for Physical Education lessons.

The new High Tunstall School (in use since September 2019) is based in one main building made up of three floors. The bottom floor is where the dining hall and administration area is (as well as the ARC which caters to students with special needs). The classes on the bottom floor teach food tech, D&T and art classes (as well as PE in the gym). The second floor has the independent learning hub which is a library for students to use in their free time to complete homework, this hub also teaches children who need extra support in main subjects. Classes on the second floor teach maths and English. The third floor teaches D&T, computer science, biology, chemistry, physics and psychology.

Outside of the main build is a small yard with benches and the gate to the main fields, here is the food pod where students can get other types of food.

D block (and the swimming pool) are still in use. D block houses lessons such as geography, CPE, history, music and drama.

== 2017/2018 official statistics ==
=== Background statistics ===
According to 2017/2018 government statistics, High Tunstall School has 1,055 students at the school in the 2017/2018 academic year. Of these, 1.6% are pupils with a statement of special educational needs (SEN) or education, health and care (EHC) plan, with a further 9.8% possessing a record without statements. This is less than the national average of 4.4% and 10.4% respectively.

== 2004 official statistics ==
=== 2004 Statistics based on Year 11 students ===
Of the students attending the school in 2004, 231 started the school year at the age of 15, meaning that they started the year as part of Year 11. 38 of the 231 possessed some form of special needs, 6 with statements. Out of the year group a solid 55% obtained a 5+ A*-C attainment level at the start of the school year, with 96% holding a 5+ A*-G attainment level, and 98% managing at least an entry level qualification. This start of year achievement would leave High Tunstall above average for both the Hartlepool LEA and England.

=== Four-year record ===
| Year | 5+ A*-C grades | 1+ GCSE/GNVQ/Qualification |
|---|---|---|
| 2001 | 50% | 99% |
| 2002 | 51% | 96% |
| 2003 | 61% | 97% |
| 2004 | 55% | 98% |

== Notable former pupils ==
- Ryan Brobbel, professional footballer
- Michael Brown, former Premier League footballer and England U21 international
- Jonathan Mitchell, professional footballer
- Bryn Morris, professional footballer
- Ellis Taylor, professional footballer
