= Graeme Scarratt =

English cricketer

Personal information
- Full name: Graeme Scarratt
- Born: 14 September 1945 (age 81); Hartlepool, County Durham, England
- Batting: Left-handed
- Bowling: Leg break

Domestic team information
- Years: Team
- 1968–1972: Durham

Career statistics
Competition	List A
Matches	1
Runs scored	4
Batting average	4.00
100s/50s	–/–
Top score	4
Balls bowled	–
Wickets	–
Bowling average	–
5 wickets in innings	–
10 wickets in match	–
Best bowling	–
Catches/stumpings	–/–
- Source: Cricinfo, 7 August 2011

Graeme Scarratt (born 14 September 1945) is an English former cricketer. Scarratt was a left-handed batsman who bowled leg break. He was born in Hartlepool, County Durham.

Scarratt made his debut for Durham against the Yorkshire Second XI in the 1968 Minor Counties Championship. He played Minor counties cricket for Durham from 1968 to 1972, making 24 Minor Counties Championship appearances. He made his only List A appearance against Oxfordshire in the 1972 Gillette Cup. In this match, he was dismissed for 4 runs by Saeed Hatteea.
