= West Park, Hartlepool =

Coordinates: 54.682°N 1.249°W

West Park
- Location within County Durham
- OS grid reference: NZ485321
- Unitary authority: Hartlepool
- Ceremonial county: County Durham
- Region: North East
- Country: England
- Sovereign state: United Kingdom
- Post town: HARTLEPOOL
- Postcode district: TS26
- Police: Cleveland
- Fire: Cleveland
- Ambulance: North East

West Park is a suburban area of Hartlepool, County Durham, in England. It is situated on the western fringes of Hartlepool.
