= Johnny Longstaff =

English anti-fascist activist (1919–2000)

John Longstaff
- Birth name: John Edward Longstaff
- Born: 10 October 1919 Stockton-on-Tees, England
- Died: 2000
- Known for: Anti-fascist activism
- Conflicts: Spanish Civil War; Second World War
- Spouse: Pauline

John Edward Longstaff (1919-2000) was an English anti-fascist activist and soldier, who served with the International Brigades in Spain and later with the British Army during the Second World War.

== History ==
Born in Stockton-on-Tees in October 1919, his early life was marked by poverty. He recalled begging for bread from workers leaving the factories. He left school and worked in a foundry before being injured by hot metal, finding himself unemployed after recovery.

At the age of 15 he joined the 1934 hunger march to London. Despite initially being refused due to his age, he followed the march at a distance for a few days before being taken in. On arrival in London he witnessed police attacks on the march at Hyde Park. He found work and was involved in an industrial dispute around the YMCA in Tooting, which led to his involvement in organised labour movement politics.

He played a part in the Battle of Cable Street where he says he first heard the words No Pasaran and learned of the war in Spain. He enlisted in the 15th International Brigade and left for Spain in September 1937. He fought in the Battle of Jarama and the July 1938 crossing of the Ebro, attempting to recapture Gandesa. He was with Lewis Clive when he died. On 24 August, while defending Hill 666 in the Serra de Pàndols near Gandesa under artillery bombardment and an attack by two rebel battalions, Longstaff was severely wounded and temporarily blinded.

He returned to the UK soon before the outbreak of the Second World War. He enlisted, despite being rejected at first because of his experience in Spain, and fought in North Africa and Italy, including the Battle of El Alamein and Monte Cassino. He became a sergeant and was awarded for gallantry.

He married Pauline in 1940, raised a family and worked as a civil servant after the war.

Longstaff's wartime memories were recorded by the Imperial War Museum in 1984 and 1988. He died in 2000.

Longstaff came to public prominence in 2019 when his life inspired a musical theatre production, The Ballad of Johnny Longstaff, by folk singers The Young'uns.
