= West Hartlepool War Memorial =

War memorial in Hartlepool, County Durham, England

- Hartlepool Borough Council
- For Soldiers from West Hartlepool who fought in World War I
- Established: 1923
- Unveiled: 11 October 1923
- Location: 54.6850°N 1.2144°W; Hartlepool, County Durham, England
- Designed by: George Coombs
- (North Elevation) In grateful remembrance of the men of this town who at their country's call left all that was dear to them to hazard their lives that others might live in freedom. Their name liveth for evermore (South Elevation) Thine O Lord is the victory

West Hartlepool War Memorial or Victory Square War Memorial or Victoria Square Cenotaph is a war memorial in Hartlepool, County Durham, England commemorating those from West Hartlepool who died in World War I and World War II. The war memorial, created in the 1920s, is located on Victoria Road in Hartlepool's Victory Square. (Note: Victoria Road was previously Cambridge Road; In concert with Queen Victoria's 1897 Diamond Jubilee the name of the road was changed to Victoria Road. In the 1920s the land that Victory Square is situated on was "The Armoury Field" in West Hartlepool. Since 1966, West Hartlepool is part of the town of Hartlepool.) The square was created for this monument.

== Victory Square ==
There was much deliberation about the selection of the site for the memorial or cenotaph. The idea was for the war memorial to be placed in a public square, which would face municipal buildings on the north side and be balanced with public buildings on the south side. Victory Square, a large area in the center of town, was established for that purpose. The mayor of West Hartlepool from 1915 to 1917, Alderman Charles Macfarlane, introduced the idea of using land already designated for municipal buildings, previously "The Armoury Field", for a World War I memorial. Later approved at a public meeting, the cost was estimated at £150,000. It was also proposed that housing be created for seniors and the disabled as a related project. Donations came in for Cottage Homes "in connection with the war memorial", such as that by J. W. Crosby, partner in one of the towns shipping firms, Crosby, Magee & Co. who gave £5.000.

== World War I Memorial ==
The 66 feet (20 m) high obelisk monument made of grey Aberdeen granite and bronze sits on a pedestal. Bronze bas-relief of laurel wreaths are located at the top of the monument on each side. Another wreath is situated near the bottom with the town coat of arms and the motto "E Mare ex Industria" ("Industry comes from the Sea"). There are also bronze wreaths on the pedestal. The plinth, with cyma-moulding, sits on a 77 feet (23 m) wide, five terraced base; the five steps symbolise the number of years of World War I. There are a total of 1545 names to commemorate those from World War I. The twelve bronze panels honour the 1548 townsmen belonging to 75 different units of the Army, Royal Navy and Royal Air Force.

A competition for the memorial design was managed by architect Ernest Newton, RA, who was then President of Royal Institute of British Architects. The winner was George J Coombs of Aberdeen. Coombs' design was apparently complete by 1921, when he died, and his plans were carried out by George Bennett Mitchell, Vice-President of the Institute of Scottish Architects. The memorial was built by D. G. Somerville and Company of London and A Fyfe and Son. It was cast at H.H. Martyn & Co. It is classified as a Grade II monument.

On 11 October 1923 the memorial was to be unveiled by the Earl of Durham (Frederick Lambton, 4th Earl of Durham), but he fell ill and his brother, Brigadier-General Charles Lambton performed the unveiling. It was dedicated by the Bishop of Durham. (Note: Two months later, on 17 December 1923, the Redheugh Gardens War Memorial was unveiled by Frederick Lambton, 4th Earl of Durham.)

=== Inscriptions ===
The north elevation bears the arms of West Hartlepool within a wreath. Located on the top of the obelisks' pedestal is the leading inscription "The Great War 1914–1919" followed by the inscription derived from the King George V's message to the next of kin of the dead of the British Empire,

In grateful remembrance of the men of this town who at their country's call left all that was dear to them to hazard their lives that others might live in freedom. Their name liveth for evermore.

The southern elevation contains the words "THINE O LORD / IS THE VICTORY" surmounted by a cross.

== World War II pillars ==
After the end of World War II, four 7 feet 4 inches (2.24 m) high white granite pillars were added near the Victory Square obelisk to commemorate those who lost their lives during that war. Each of the four-sided pillars is mounted with a bronze plaque containing the name of the fallen. A tree was planted between each of the pillars. The pillars were unveiled by Father David Coxon of St. Joseph's Roman Catholic Church, Reverend Tony Whipp of St. Aidan's Church and, representing Seafarers, Ken Cornford.

== Memorial responsibility ==
The responsibility for maintenance and upkeep of the memorial resides with the Hartlepool Borough Council's Neighborhood Services department. In 2008 restoration work was completed to clean and restore the stonework and plaques, which included resolving staining of the patina.

== See also ==
- Raid on Scarborough, Hartlepool and Whitby – World War I bombing of West Hartlepool
- Redheugh Gardens War Memorial – another war memorial in Hartlepool
