= Redheugh Gardens War Memorial =

War memorial in Hartlepool, County Durham, England

- Hartlepool Borough Council
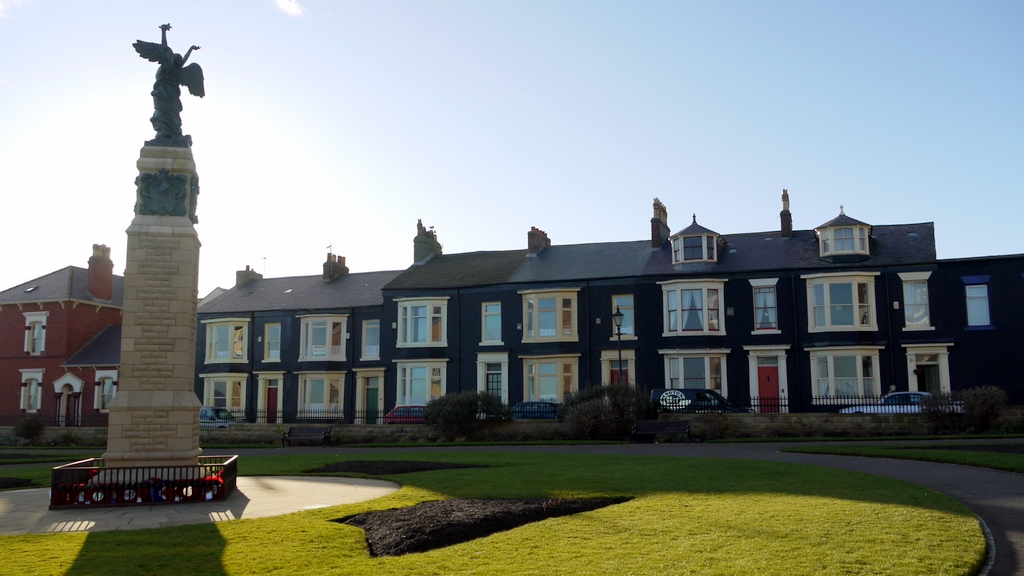
- For Civilians and servicemen killed in World War I
- Unveiled: 17 December 1921
- Location: 54.6958°N 1.1768°W; Hartlepool, County Durham, England
- Designed by: Philip Bennison
- East face: "FOR US THEY DIED"; west face: "LIVE THOU FOR ENGLAND".

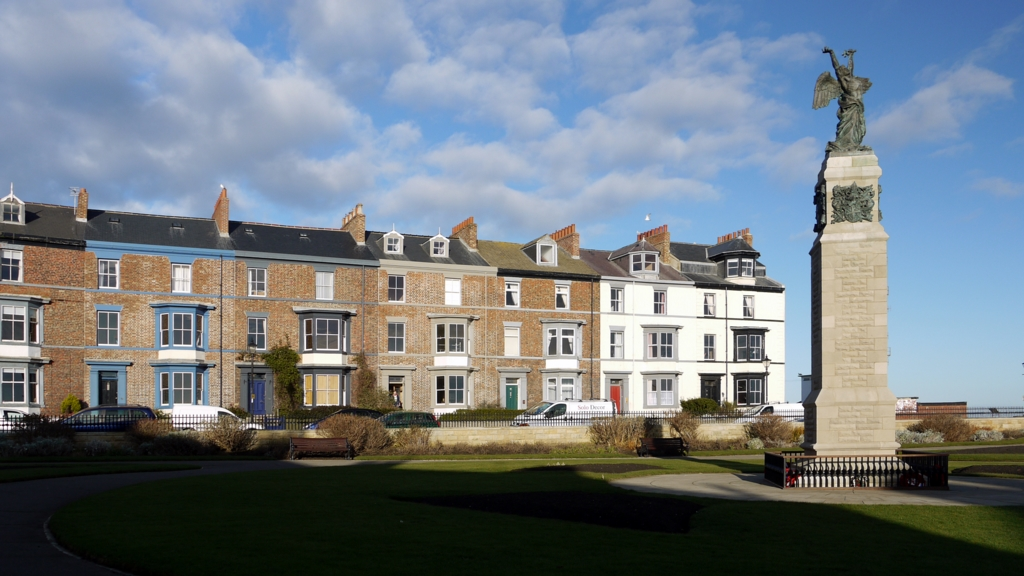
War Memorial, Redheugh Gardens, Hartlepool Headland

Redheugh Gardens War Memorial or Hartlepool War Memorial is a World War I and World War II memorial located in the Headlands of Hartlepool, County Durham, England. It commemorates Hartlepool military servicemen and civilians who lost their lives in both wars – with specific mention of the first British soldiers to have died on British soil during 16 December 1914 Raid on Scarborough, Hartlepool and Whitby of World War I. In 2001 a plaque was unveiled to memorialise 240 men and women who succumbed from 1919 to 1967 during war and conflict. (Note: By 1967 "Old Hartlepool", or the original town of Hartlepool, and West Hartlepool had been merged into one Hartlepool municipality.)

== Raid on Scarborough, Hartlepool and Whitby ==
The death of the first soldiers on British soil during World War I is commemorated by the Redheugh Gardens War Memorial, which was unveiled seven years and one day after the East Coast Raid.

== Winged Victory memorial ==
The memorial, commissioned by the War Memorial Committee and designed by Philip B. Bennison, commemorates the servicemen and civilians who lost their lives in World War I. The main figure on the memorial is the draped Winged Victory (also called Triumphant Youth). The unveiling program describes it as: "The winged figure of Triumphant Youth which crowns the column, symbolizes a spiritual freedom and regeneration which comes through pain and sacrifice." It is sculpted in bronze and sits upon several pedestals made of limestone and ashlar. First below the sculpture is a chamfered plinth and cornice that carries on each of its four faces the bronze: the Hartlepool town seal, the Brus family (Hartlepool overlords) coat of arms, the coat of arms of Prince Bishops of Durham and, representing the Raid on Hartlepool, a 1914 dated cartouche of the lighthouse. The bronze panels were made by R.H. Machin. The pedestal at the base is a square shaft that is rockfaced and coursed.

The memorial inscriptions are:

- West face: "LIVE THOU FOR ENGLAND"
- East face: "FOR US THEY DIED"

John Lambton, 3rd Earl of Durham unveiled the memorial and Rev. D. Patterson performed the dedication on 17 December 1921. The wife of Hartlepool Councillor C.T. Watson unveiled the plaques. (Note: Two months earlier, on 11 October 1923 the West Hartlepool War Memorial was to be unveiled by the Earl of Durham (Frederick Lambton, 4th Earl of Durham), but he fell ill and his brother, Brigadier-General Charles Lambton, was deputised and performed the unveiling.)

It was made a Grade II structure has been listed with the British Listed Buildings since 1985. In 2002 the memorial was renovated, including new gates, railings and walls.

== Memorial wall ==
Designed by Philip B. Bennison, ARCA, the Whitbed Portland stone wall was first built as a World War I memorial, and its use was extended to memorialise those from World War II. The wall has five bronze slate panels 2 feet 8 inches (0.81 m) high x 1 foot 4 inches (0.41 m) wide of the names of the deceased.

The inscriptions on the first four panels are:

- "To these Unconquered Dead" (on the wall)
- "Of the Navy / Army and / Mercantile / Marine /" (at the top of panels)
- "Who fell in the Great War / and in grateful appreciation / of those who shared its dangers" (on the wall).

On a fifth panel is the inscription: "Bombardment. / The following / were killed in the / bombardment / of Hartlepool / December 16th 1914" and 52 full names. Pillars at the end of the wall contain the dates of the wars.

Funded by public subscription, the memorial was unveiled by John Lambton, 3rd Earl of Durham on 17 December 1921.

On the back of the wall is a 2001 memorial to 240 "Citizens, Servicemen and Servicewomen of the Borough of Hartlepool / who gave their lives in conflict and War during the years from 1919 to 1967." There are two bronze plaques each 1 foot 6 inches (0.46 m) x 2 feet (0.61 m) with the town badge of Hartlepool and the initials and surnames of the dead. The David Timlin MBE War Memorial Appeal Fund raised the money for the plaques through public subscription, and as a result there is a commemorative plate acknowledging Timlin's efforts. The memorial plaques were dedicated on 24 June 2001.

== Gallery ==
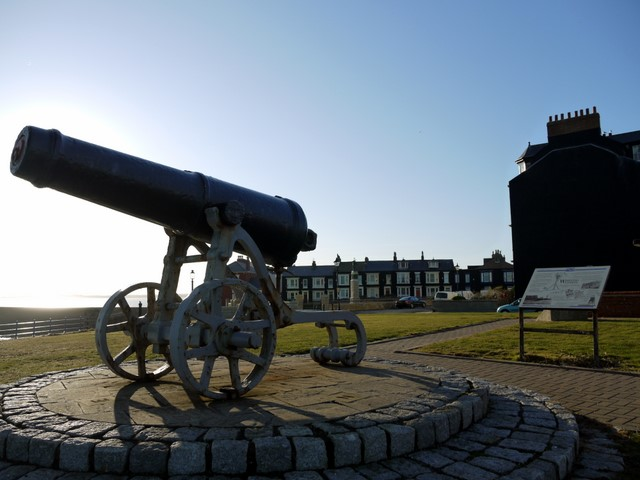
Cannon, Heugh Headland, Hartlepool. (Note: A plaque nearby gives the following history. "The cannon was captured from the Russian Army at the Battle of Sebastopol during the Crimean War (1854–56). In 1857, the then Secretary of State, Lord Panmure, offered the cannon to Hartlepool Borough Council who gratefully accepted it. It was transported from London on the steam ship 'Margaret', at a total cost of £2.19s.3d and after a year's delay, arrived at Hartlepool in September 1858".)

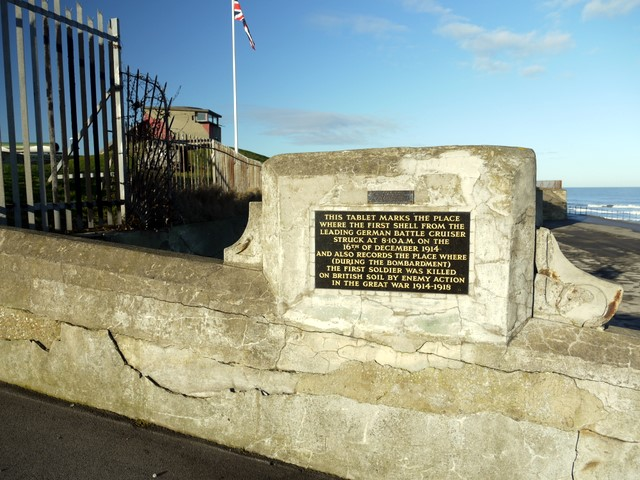
Plaque marks the first attack on Hartlepool on 16 December 1914 and the first British soldier killed on the British mainland during World War I. (Note: The memorial marks the location where first German navy shell landed during its attack on Hartlepool and killed the first British soldier on the British mainland during World War I, on 16 December 1914. Listed on the site of origin as 'near the Heugh Battery' and described within the minutes of Hartlepool Borough Council dated 7 December 1921 as 'War Memorial Tablet')

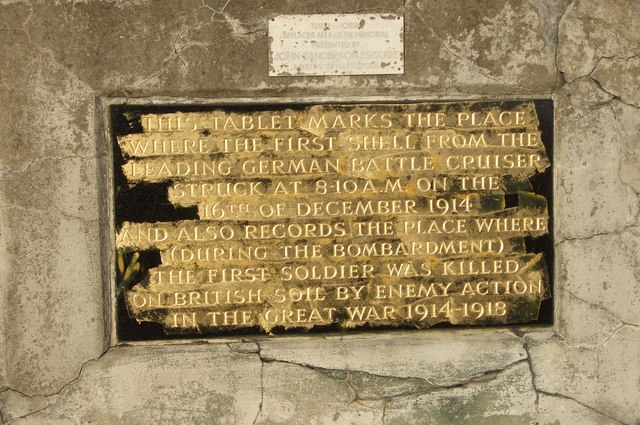
Memorial to the first British soldier killed on British soil during the Great War

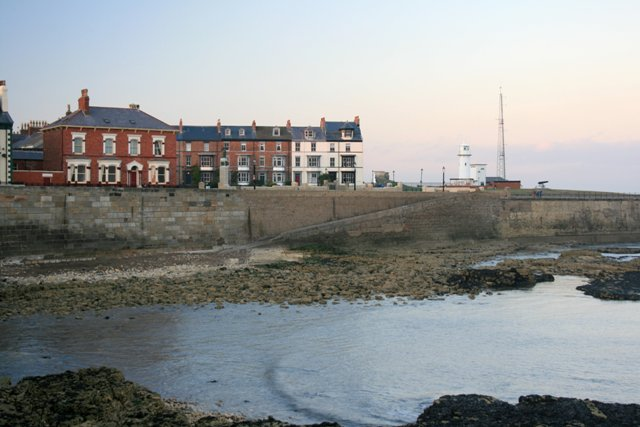
Cliff Terrace From the Breakwater With the lighthouse on the right and the war memorial standing in Redheugh Gardens left of centre.

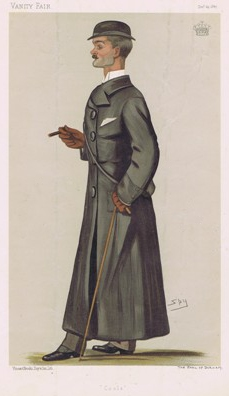
The Earl of Durham as caricatured by Spy (Leslie Ward) in Vanity Fair, December 1887

== See also ==
- Raid on Scarborough, Hartlepool and Whitby – East coast raid during World War I
- West Hartlepool War Memorial
