= The Young'uns =

Folk music trio from Teesside, England

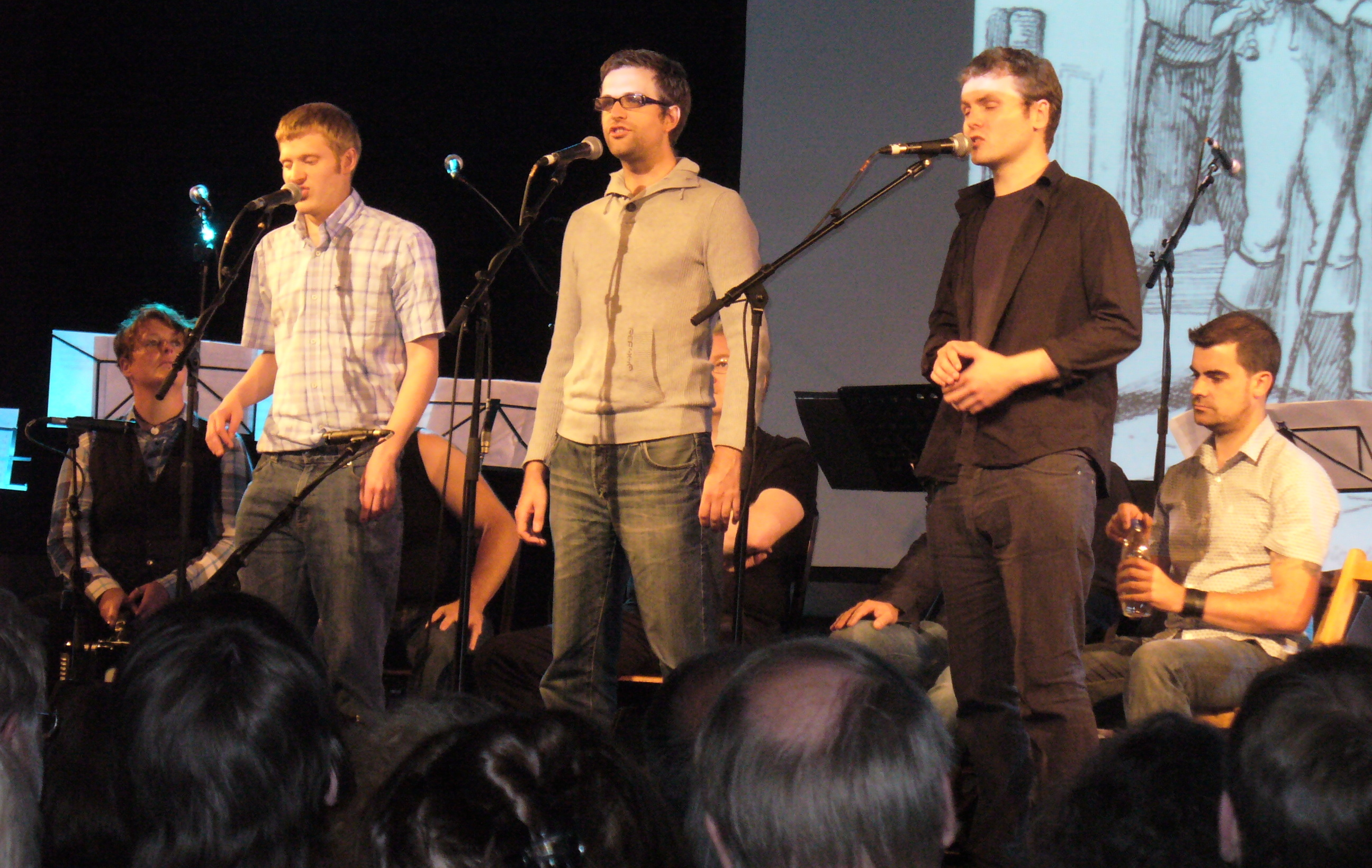

Background information
- Origin: Stockton-on-Tees, England
- Genres: Folk
- Members: Sean Cooney; David Eagle; Michael Hughes
- Website: www.theyounguns.co.uk

The Young'uns are an English folk group from Stockton, County Durham, England, who won the BBC Radio 2 Folk Awards "Best Group" award in 2015 and 2016 and "Best Album" for Strangers in 2018. They specialise in singing unaccompanied, performing traditional folk songs and sea shanties, contemporary folk songs such as Billy Bragg's 1985 song "Between the Wars" and Sydney Carter's 1981 song "John Ball", and original works including "You Won’t Find Me on Benefits Street" (alluding to Stockton's reaction to a Benefits Street television crew) and "The Battle of Stockton" (on a 1933 clash with Oswald Mosley's blackshirts). They champion the folk music of the North East of England, where they are from, celebrating local history and performing songs by local songwriters such as Graeme Miles.

The members are Sean Cooney, David Eagle and Michael Hughes, who met as teenagers and encountered folk music as underage drinkers in a local pub. They enjoyed the music and returned to the Stockton Folk Club, where "One day someone said 'let's hear a song from the young'uns' and we sang this one verse we knew from a sea shanty", hence the band's name.

2017 album Strangers includes nine new songs celebrating inspiring people "A homage to the outsider; a eulogy for the wayfarer; a hymn for the migrant". "These Hands" tells the life story of 1950s immigrant Sybil Phoenix, while the story of the Battle of Cable Street is told through the words of Stockton teenager Johnny Longstaff. In February 2020, the band debuted the stage production The Ballad of Johnny Longstaff at Newcastle's Northern Stage theatre to rave reviews.

The Young'uns released a book titled Bound Together in 2017, chronicling their history as a band and the stories behind some of the songwriting.

In 2023 The Young'uns released their ninth album Tiny Notes, which consists entirely of original songs that "recall victims of war and terrorism and heroes of the hour, turning the spotlight on injustice and ultimately celebrating love, tolerance and the indomitable human spirit."

== Discography ==
- To Hell With Pirate John! (2007)
- Plastic Cod'eads (2008)
- Man, I Feel Like A Young'un (2010)
- When Our Grandfathers Said No (2012)
- Never Forget (2014)
- Another Man's Ground (2015)
- Strangers (2017)
- The Ballad Of Johnny Longstaff (2019)
- Tiny Notes (2023)

== Awards ==
- BBC Radio 2 Folk Awards "Best Album" - Strangers (2018)
- BBC Radio 2 Folk Awards "Best Group" (2015)
- BBC Radio 2 Folk Awards "Best Group" (2016)
- Spiral Awards "Best Live Act" (2015)
- FATEA awards: "Band/duo of the year" (2014)
