= Hartlepool Life =

Hartlepool Life is the free weekly newspaper for Hartlepool in County Durham, England. Hartlepool Life distributes the newspaper each Wednesday, and the majority of its news articles are "positive" stories about the town of Hartlepool and its surrounding villages of Hart, Elwick, Dalton Piercy and Greatham. It launched on March 22, 2017.

== Distribution ==
The free newspaper is distributed through pick up points at over 180 outlets across the town every Wednesday. Outlets include local supermarkets and many small businesses, and Hartlepool Borough Council buildings.

== Online Presence ==
The weekly publication is posted online each following Monday, while their "Announcements" page is posted on the day of release. The newspaper has a Facebook page and a website.

Director of the newspaper is Dirk Van Der Werff [2].
