= David Eagle (singer) =

British comedian and musician (born 1985)

David Eagle (born 1985) is a comedian, singer and musician from Hartlepool, England.

Eagle began his performing career as part of the folk group The Young'uns. The band won Best Group at the BBC Radio 2 Folk Awards in 2015 and 2016. With The Young'uns, he performed as part of the 40th Anniversary Tour of Peter Bellamy's The Transports.

Eagle has been blind since he was nine months old, often using it for comic effect both during The Young'uns and stand up gigs:

"At a London gig a couple of years back, Eagle, who is blind, walked on stage, collided with the microphone and shot back: “I’m not blind really. I’m just doing it for effect.” Revealing now that, on another occasion, he fell off the stage, he says: “I love it when something happens. I mean, obviously, it hurts. But how can you do a bad gig with an opening like that, when people are laughing before the first song?”"

Eagle began performing stand up in 2018. In November 2018, he won the title of "Nottingham Comedy Festival New Comedian of the Year". In April 2019, Eagle won the Bath Comedy Festival New Act Competition. In December 2019, he won the prestigious Leicester Square Theatre's New Comedian of the Year. He was second place in The Great Yorkshire Fringe New Comedian of the Year competition 2019.

Eagle was featured on three episodes of the flagship Radio 4 comedy show The Now Show. His debut TV performance was on Rosie Jones' Disability Comedy Extravaganza in August 2024. His debut Edinburgh Fringe Show "The Eagle Is Candid" gained Eagle a nomination for Best Show and won the Spirit of the Fringe award, previous winners including The Flight of the Concords, The League of Gentlemen, Stewart Lee, Ross Noble and Phil Nichol. He also won the Visually Impaired Excellence Award from the Neurodiverse Review Awards at the 2024 Edinburgh Festival Fringe.

His debut, four part, BBC Radio 4 stand up series "David Eagle: See No Eagle" was broadcast in December 2025 and January 2026 covering topics such as his first steps into comedy, an anti-social accordion based incident, how technology can help (and hinder) blind people and the adventures he's had on the road as a folk musician.

== Personal life ==
David Eagle is married to Ellie Eagle-Skinner, together they host The David Eagle Podcast. One episode includes their wedding being interrupted by Extinction Rebellion protesting in Sheffield.
