= Hartlepool =

Town in County Durham, England

Coordinates: 54.69°N 1.21°W

- Town
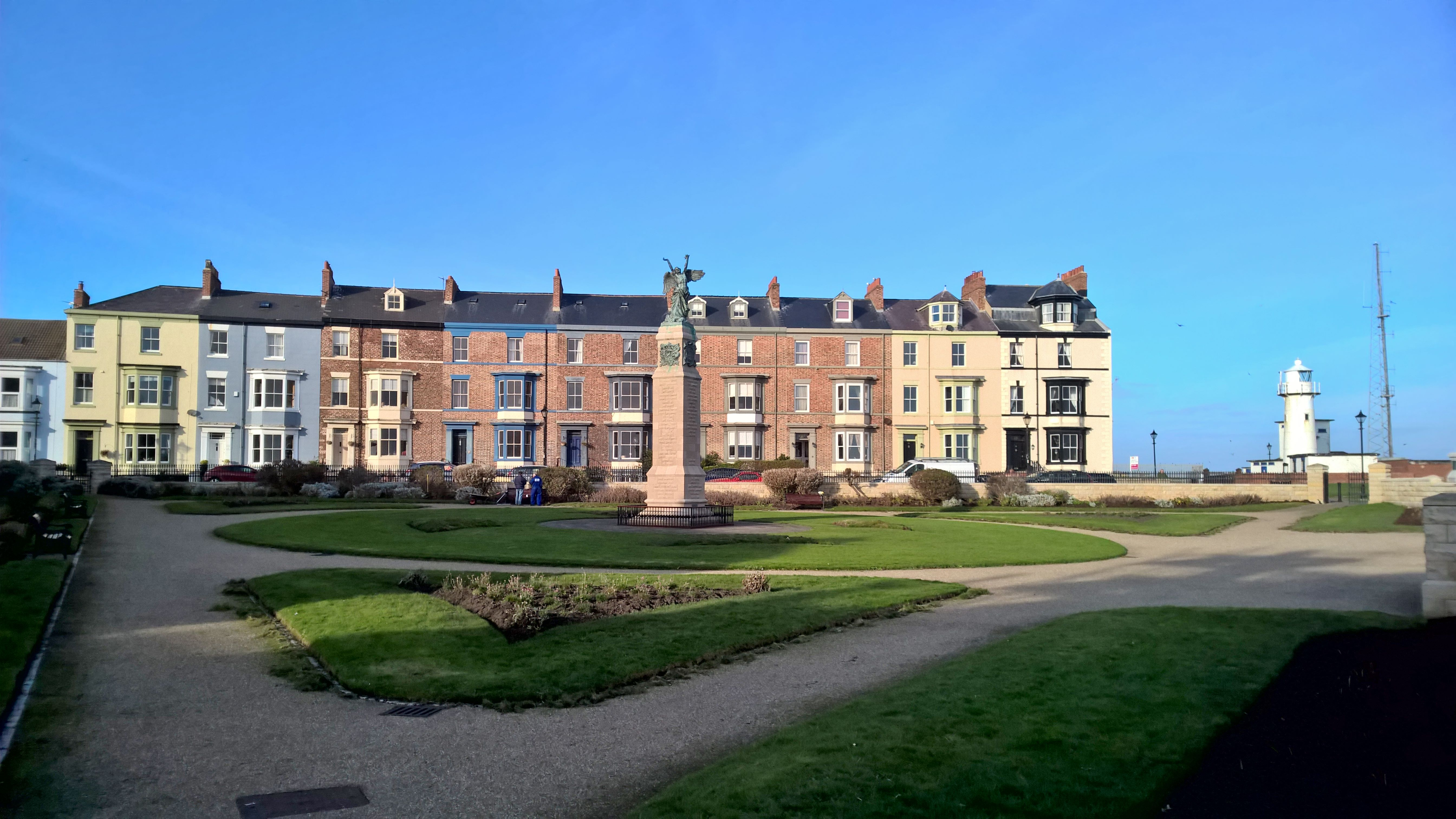
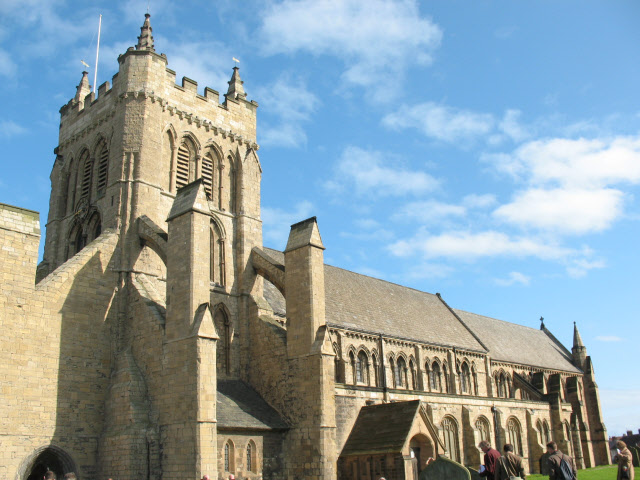
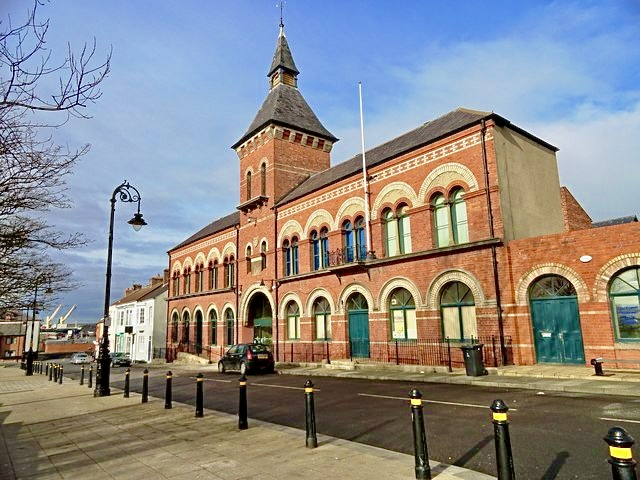
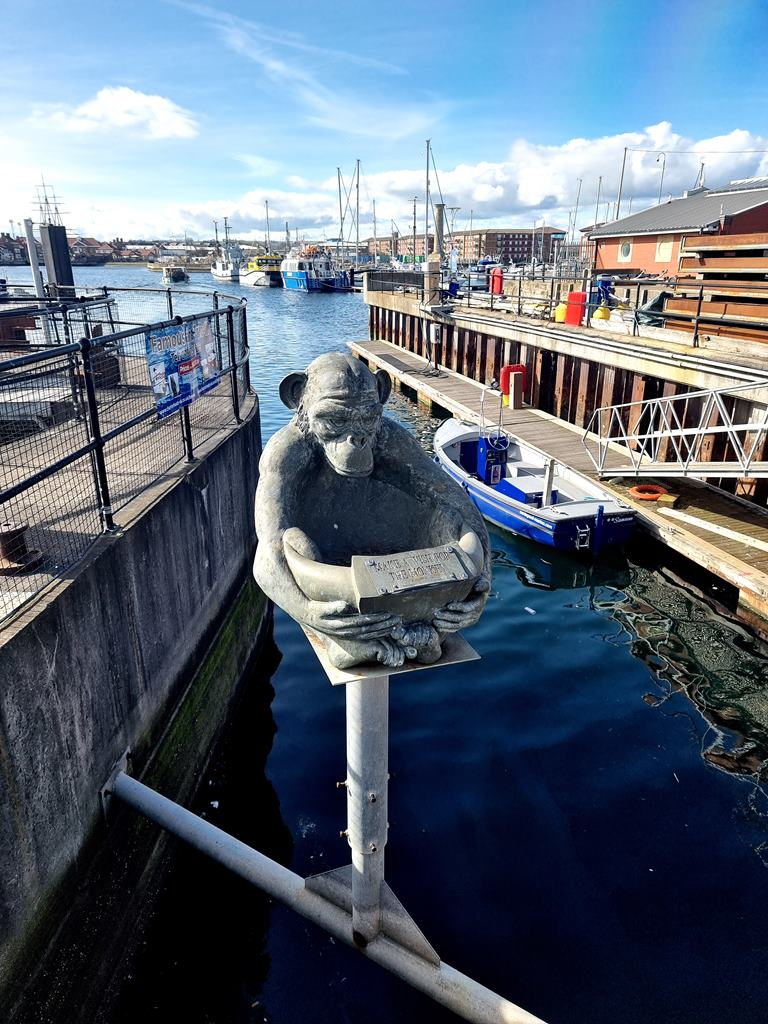
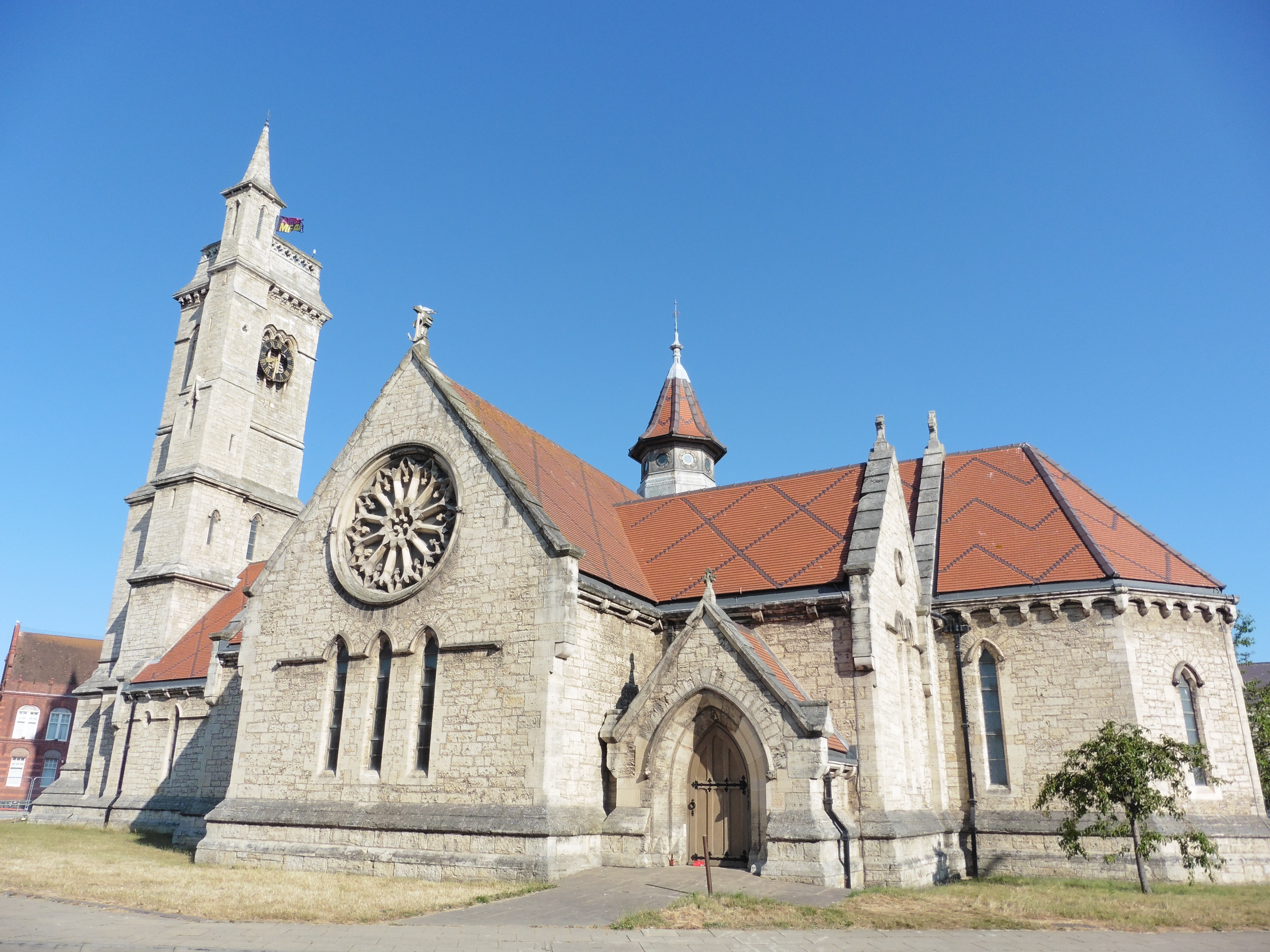
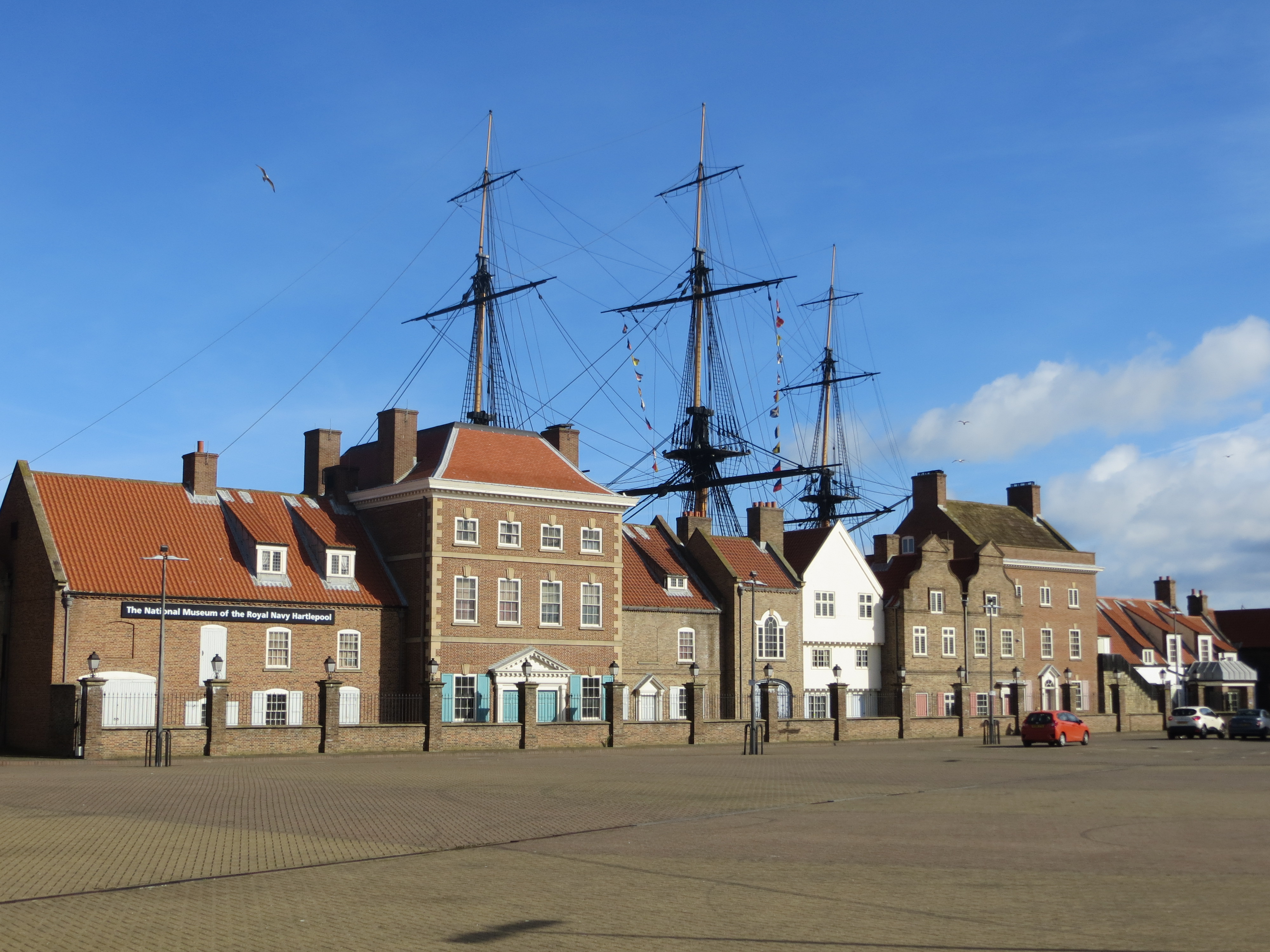
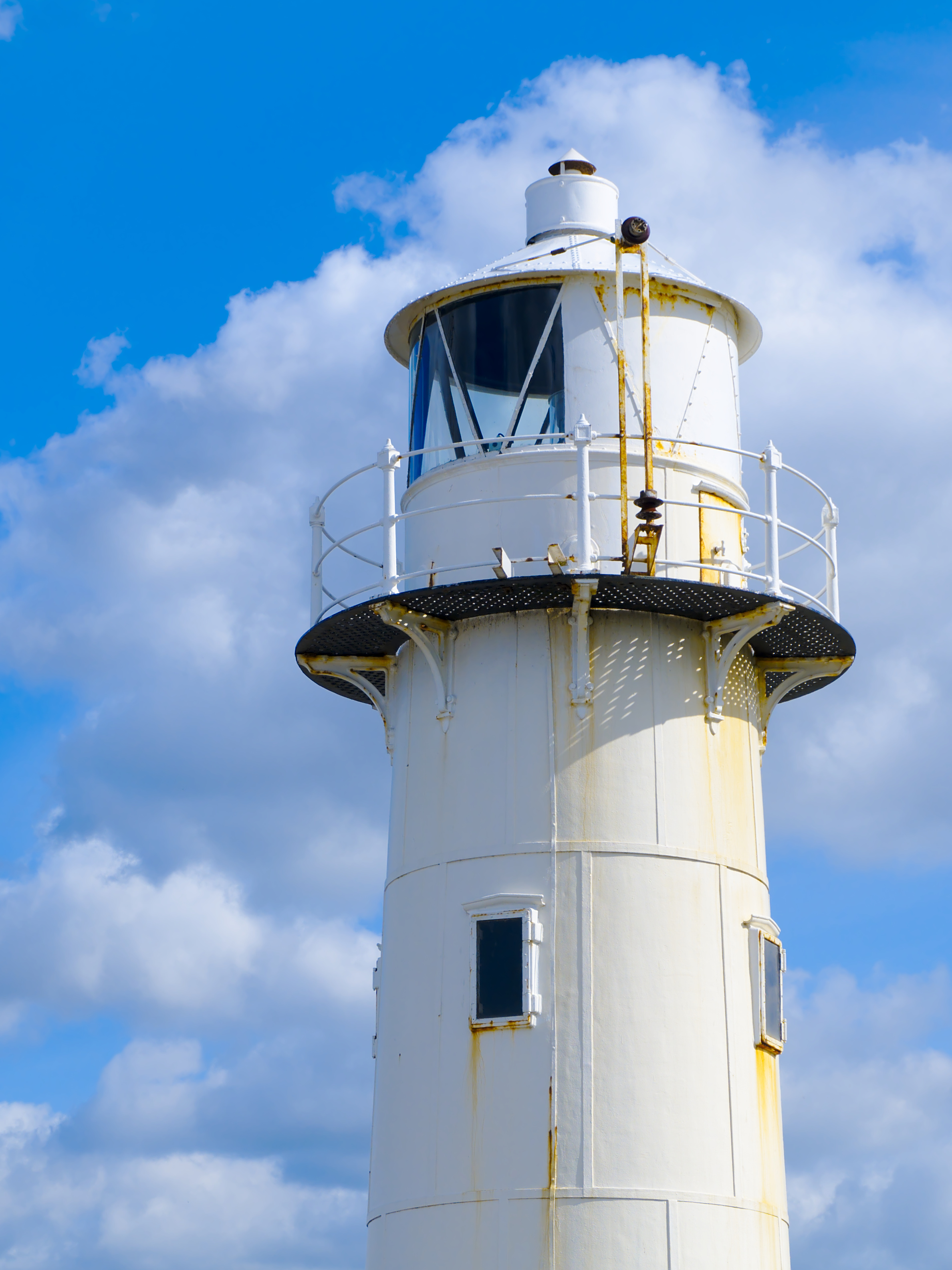
- Headland St Hilda's Church Borough Hall Marina Christ Church Art Gallery Royal Navy Museum The Heugh

- A hart (red stag)

- Location within County Durham
- Population: 87,984 (2021 Census)
- Demonym: Hartlepudlian
- OS grid reference: NZ508331
  - London: 261 miles (420 km)
- Unitary authority: Hartlepool
- Ceremonial county: County Durham
- Region: North East
- Country: England
- Sovereign state: United Kingdom
- Areas of the town: List: Hart Station; Headland (parish); Middleton; Owton; Rift House; Seaton Carew; Stranton; Throston
- Post town: HARTLEPOOL
- Postcode district: TS24–TS27
- Dialling code: 01429
- Police: Cleveland
- Fire: Cleveland
- Ambulance: North East
- UK Parliament: Hartlepool

Hartlepool (/ˈhɑːrtlɪpuːl/ HART-lih-pool) is an industrial port town, in County Durham, England. It is governed by a unitary authority borough named after the town. The borough is part of the devolved Tees Valley area, approximately 25 miles (40 km) south-west of Newcastle upon Tyne, 17 miles (27 km) south of Sunderland and 8 miles (13 km) north of Middlesbrough. The built-up area had a population of 87,984 at the 2021 Census.

The old town was founded in the seventh century, around the monastery of Hartlepool Abbey, on a headland. As the village grew into a town in the Middle Ages, its harbour served as the County Palatine of Durham's official port. The new town of West Hartlepool was created in 1835, after a new port was built and railway links from the South Durham coal fields (to the west) and from Stockton-on-Tees (to the south) were created. A parliamentary constituency covering both the old town and West Hartlepool was created, in 1867, called The Hartlepools. The two towns were formally merged into a single borough called Hartlepool in 1967. Following the merger, the name of the constituency was changed to Hartlepool' in 1974. The modern town centre and main railway station are both at what was West Hartlepool; the old town is now generally known as the Headland.

Industrialisation and the start of a shipbuilding industry in the later part of the 19th century meant it was a target for the Imperial German Navy at the beginning of the First World War. A bombardment of 1,150 shells on 16 December 1914 resulted in the death of 117 people in the town. A severe decline in heavy industries and shipbuilding following the Second World War caused periods of high unemployment until the 1990s when major investment projects and the redevelopment of the docks area into the Hartlepool Marina saw a rise in the town's prospects. The town also has a seaside resort at Seaton Carew.

== History ==
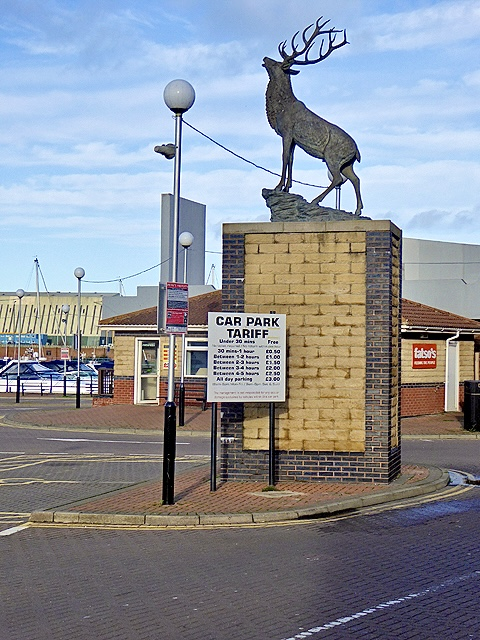
The hart sculpture

=== Toponymy ===
The place name derives from Old English heort ("hart"), referring to stags seen, and pōl (pool), a pool of drinking water which they were known to use. Records of the place-name from early sources confirm this:

- 649: Heretu, or Hereteu
- 1017: Herterpol, or Hertelpolle
- 1182: Hierdepol.

=== Town on the heugh ===
A Northumbrian settlement developed in the seventh century around an abbey, which was founded in 640 by Saint Aidan, an Irish Christian priest, upon a headland overlooking a natural harbour and the North Sea. The monastery became powerful under St Hilda, who served as its abbess from 649 to 657. The eighth-century Northumbrian chronicler Bede referred to the spot on which today's town is sited as "the place where deer come to drink"; in this period, the Headland was named by the Angles as Heruteu (Stag Island). Archaeological evidence has been found below the current high tide mark that indicates that an ancient post-glacial forest by the sea existed in the area at the time.

The Abbey fell into decline in the early 8th century and it was probably destroyed during a sea raid by Vikings on the settlement in the 9th century. In March 2000, the archaeological investigation television programme Time Team located the foundations of the lost monastery in the grounds of St Hilda's Church. In the early 11th century, the name had evolved into Herterpol.

=== Hartness ===
During the Norman Conquest, the De Brus family gained over-lordship of the land surrounding Hartlepool. William the Conqueror subsequently ordered the construction of Durham Castle and the villages under their rule were mentioned in records, in 1153, when Robert de Brus, 1st Lord of Annandale became Lord of Hartness. The town's first charter was received before 1185, for which it gained its first mayor, an annual two-week fair and a weekly market. The Norman Conquest affected the settlement's name to form the Middle English Hart-le-pool ("The Pool of the Stags").

By the Middle Ages, Hartlepool grew into an important market town. One of the reasons for its growing wealth was that its harbour was the official port of the County Palatine of Durham. With fishing as the main industry, Hartlepool became one of the primary ports on England's Eastern coast.

In 1306, Robert the Bruce was crowned King of Scotland and became the last Lord of Hartness. King Edward I confiscated the title to Hartlepool and began to improve the town's military defences in expectation of war. In 1315, before they were completed, a Scottish army under Sir James Douglas attacked, captured and looted the town.

In the late 15th century, a pier was constructed to assist in the harbour's workload.

=== Garrison ===
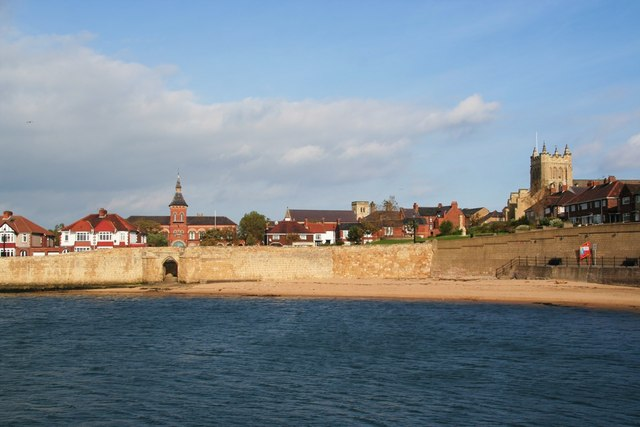
The defensive walls around Old Hartlepool

Hartlepool was once again militarily occupied by a Scottish incursion, this time in alliance with the Parliamentary Army during the English Civil War which, after 18 months, was relieved by an English Parliamentarian garrison.

In 1795, Hartlepool artillery emplacements and defences were constructed in the town as a defensive measure against the threat of French attack from seaborne Napoleonic forces. During the Crimean War, two coastal batteries were constructed close together in the town to guard against the threat of seaborne attacks from the Imperial Russian Navy. They were entitled the Lighthouse Battery (1855) and the Heugh Battery (1859).

In the 18th century, Hartlepool became known as a town with medicinal springs, particularly the Chalybeate Spa near the Westgate. The poet Thomas Gray visited the town in July 1765 to "take the waters", and wrote to his friend William Mason:

"I have been for two days to taste the water, and do assure you that nothing could be salter and bitterer and nastier and better for you... I am delighted with the place; there are the finest walks and rocks and caverns."

A few weeks later, he wrote in greater detail to James Brown:

"The rocks, the sea and the weather there more than made up to me the want of bread and the want of water, two capital defects, but of which I learned from the inhabitants not to be sensible. They live on the refuse of their own fish-market, with a few potatoes, and a reasonable quantity of Geneva [gin] six days in the week, and I have nowhere seen a taller, more robust or healthy race: every house full of ruddy broad-faced children. Nobody dies but of drowning or old-age: nobody poor but from drunkenness or mere laziness."

=== Town by the strand ===
By the early 19th century, Hartlepool was still a small town of around 900 people, with a declining port. In 1823, the council and Board of Trade decided that the town needed new industry, so the decision was made to propose a new railway to make Hartlepool a coal port, shipping out minerals from the Durham coalfield. It was in this endeavour that Isambard Kingdom Brunel visited the town in December 1831 and wrote: "A curiously isolated old fishing town – a remarkably fine race of men. Went to the top of the church tower for a view."

The plan faced local competition from new docks; 16 mi (25 km) to the north, the Marquis of Londonderry had approved the creation of the new Seaham Harbour (opened 31 July 1831), while to the south the Clarence Railway connected Stockton-on-Tees and Billingham to a new port at Port Clarence (opened 1833). Further south, in 1831, the Stockton and Darlington Railway had extended into the new port of Middlesbrough.

The council agreed the formation of the Hartlepool Dock and Railway Company (HD&RCo) to extend the existing port by developing new docks, and link to both local collieries and the developing railway network in the south. In 1833, it was agreed that Christopher Tennant of Yarm establish the HD&RCo, having previously opened the Clarence Railway (CR). Tennant's plan was that the HD&RCo would fund the creation of a new railway, the Stockton and Hartlepool Railway, which would take over the loss-making CR and extended it north to the new dock, thereby linking to the Durham coalfield.

After Tennant died in 1839, the running of the HD&RCo was taken over by Stockton-on-Tees solicitor, Ralph Ward Jackson. But Jackson became frustrated at the planning restrictions placed on the old Hartlepool dock and surrounding area for access, so bought land which was mainly sand dunes to the south-west, and established West Hartlepool. As Jackson was so successful at shipping coal from West Hartlepool through his West Hartlepool Dock and Railway Company and, as technology developed, ships grew in size and scale, the new town would eventually dwarf the old town.

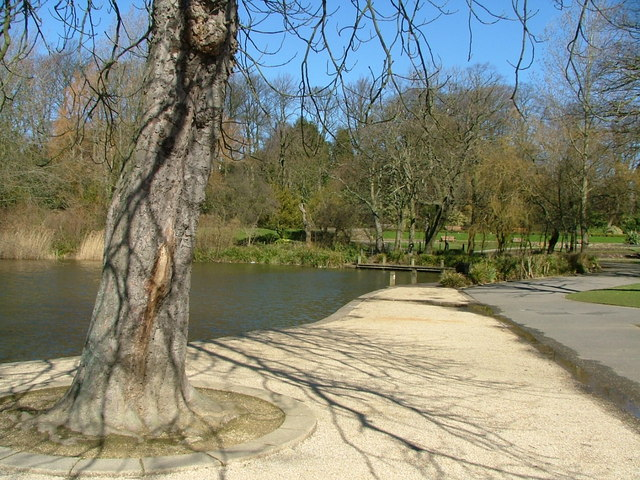
Ward Jackson Park

The 8-acre (3.2 ha) West Hartlepool Harbour and Dock opened on 1 June 1847. On 1 June 1852, the 14-acre (5.7 ha) Jackson Dock opened on the same day that a railway opened connecting West Hartlepool to Leeds, Manchester and Liverpool. This allowed the shipping of coal and wool products eastwards, and the shipping of fresh fish and raw fleeces westwards, enabling another growth spurt in the town. This, in turn, resulted in the opening of the Swainson Dock on 3 June 1856, named after Ward Jackson's father-in-law.

In 1878, the William Gray & Co shipyard in West Hartlepool achieved the distinction of launching the largest tonnage of any shipyard in the world, a feat to be repeated on a number of occasions. By 1881, old Hartlepool's population had grown from 993 to 12,361, but West Hartlepool had a population of 28,000. Ward Jackson helped to plan the layout of West Hartlepool and was responsible for the first public buildings. He was also involved in the education and the welfare of the inhabitants. In the end, he was a victim of his own ambition to promote the town: accusations of shady financial dealings, and years of legal battles, left him in near-poverty. He spent the last few years of his life in London, far away from the town he had created.

=== World Wars ===
==== First World War ====
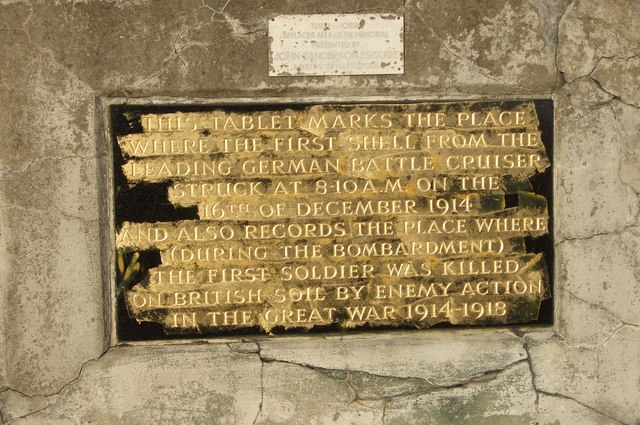
In Hartlepool near Heugh Battery, a plaque in Redheugh Gardens War Memorial "marks the place where the first ...(German shell) struck... (and) the first soldier was killed on British soil by enemy action in the Great War 1914–1918."

The area became heavily industrialised with an ironworks, established in 1838, and shipyards in the docks, which were established in the 1870s. By 1913, no fewer than 43 ship-owning companies were located in the town, with the responsibility for 236 ships. This made it a key target for Germany in the First World War. One of the first German offensives against Britain was a raid and bombardment by the Imperial German Navy on the morning of 16 December 1914,

Hartlepool was hit with a total of 1,150 shells, killing 117 people. Two coastal defence batteries at Hartlepool returned fire, launching 143 shells, and damaging three German ships: SMS Seydlitz, SMS Moltke and SMS Blücher. The Hartlepool engagement lasted roughly 50 minutes; the coastal artillery defence was supported by the Royal Navy in the form of four destroyers, two light cruisers and a submarine, none of which had any significant impact on the German attackers.

Private Theophilus Jones of the 18th Battalion Durham Light Infantry, who fell as a result of this bombardment, is sometimes described as the first military casualty on British soil by enemy fire. The death of the first soldiers on British soil is commemorated by the 1921 Redheugh Gardens War Memorial, together with a plaque unveiled on the same day seven years and one day after the East Coast Raid, at the spot on the Headland. (Note: The memorial by Philip Bennison illustrates four soldiers on one of four cartouches and the plaque, donated by a member of the public, refers to the 'first soldier' but gives no name.) A living history group, the Hartlepool Military Heritage Memorial Society, portray men of that unit for educational and memorial purposes.

Hartlepudlians voluntarily subscribed more money per head to the war effort than any other town in Britain.

==== Inter-war period ====
On 4 January 1922, a fire starting in a timber yard left 80 people homeless and caused over £1million of damage. Hartlepool suffered badly in the Great Depression of the 1930s and endured high unemployment.

==== Second World War ====
Unemployment decreased during the Second World War, with shipbuilding and steel-making industries enjoying a renaissance. Most of its output for the war effort were "Empire Ships". German bombers raided the town 43 times; compared to the previous war, civilian losses were lighter with 26 deaths recorded by Hartlepool Municipal Borough and 49 by West Hartlepool Borough. At the time, RAF Greatham (also known as RAF West Hartlepool) was located on the South British Steel Corporation Works.

=== Merger of Old and West Hartlepools ===
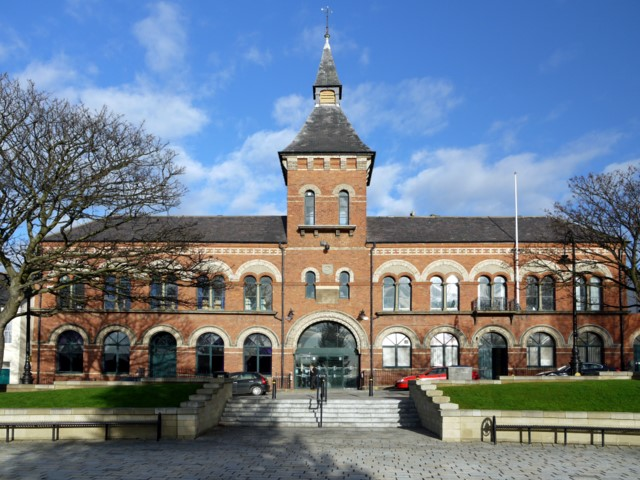
Hartlepool Borough Hall on the heugh

In 1891, the two towns had a combined population of 64,000. By 1900, the two Hartlepools were, together, one of the three busiest ports in England.

The modern town represents a joining of "Old Hartlepool", locally known as the "Headland", and the larger town of West Hartlepool. The two towns were formally unified in 1967. Today, the term "West Hartlepool" is rarely heard outside the context of sport, but one of the town's rugby union teams still retains the name.

The name of the town's professional football club reflected both boroughs; when it was formed in 1908, following the success of West Hartlepool in winning the FA Amateur Cup in 1905, it was called Hartlepools United in the hope of attracting support from both towns. When the boroughs combined in 1967, the club renamed itself Hartlepool before settling on Hartlepool United in the 1970s. Many fans of the club still refer to the team as "Pools".

=== Post-war period ===
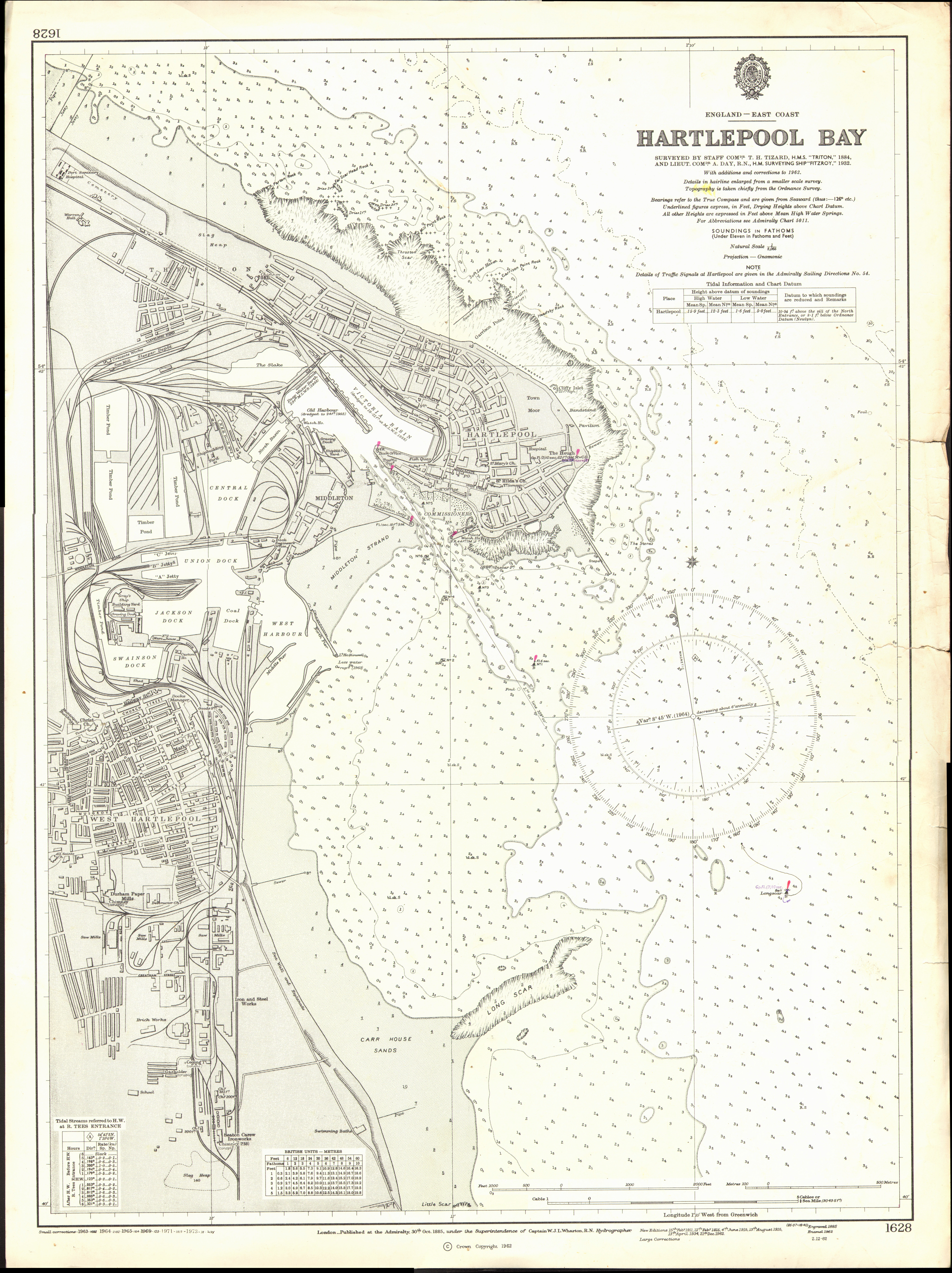
A 1962 chart of Hartlepool and the Bay, showing the infrastructure before the closure of the steel works and the filling-in of several of the docks

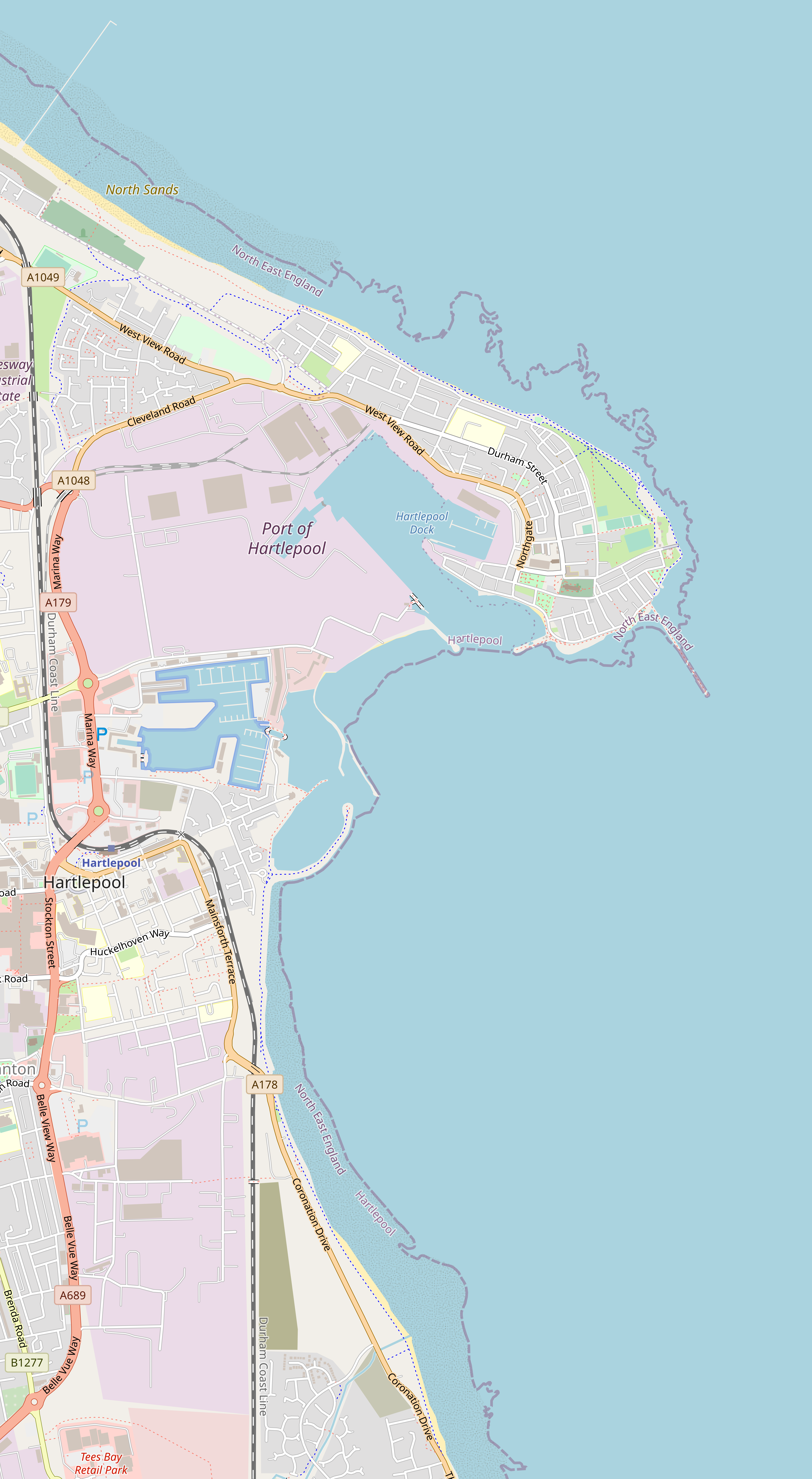
A 2021 map of the town's coastline

After the war, industry went into a severe decline. Blanchland, the last ship to be constructed in Hartlepool, left the slips in 1961. In 1967, Betty James wrote how "if I had the luck to live anywhere in the North East [of England]...I would live near Hartlepool. If I had the luck". There was a boost to the retail sector in 1970 when Middleton Grange Shopping Centre was opened by Princess Anne, with over 130 new shops including Marks & Spencer and Woolworths.

Before the shopping centre was opened, the old town centre was located around Lynn Street, but most of the shops and the market had moved to a new shopping centre by 1974. Most of Lynn Street had by then been demolished to make way for a new housing estate. Only the north end of the street remains, now called Lynn Street North. This is where the Hartlepool Borough Council depot was based, alongside the Focus DIY store, until it moved to the marina in August 2006.

In 1977, the British Steel Corporation closed its Hartlepool steelworks, with the loss of 1,500 jobs. In the 1980s, the area was afflicted with extremely high levels of unemployment, at its peak consisting of 30 per cent of the town's working-age population, the highest in the United Kingdom. 630 jobs at British Steel were lost in 1983, and a total of 10,000 jobs were lost from the town in the economic deindustrialisation of England's former Northern manufacturing heartlands. Between 1983 and 1999, the town lacked a cinema and areas of it became afflicted with the societal hallmarks of endemic economic poverty: urban decay, high crime levels, drug and alcohol dependency being prevalent.

Docks near the centre were redeveloped and reopened by Queen Elizabeth II in 1993 as a marina. The accompanying National Museum of the Royal Navy opened in 1994, then known as the Hartlepool Historic Quay.

A development corporation is under consultation until August 2022 to organise projects, with the town's fund given to the town and other funds. If the corporation is formed, plans would be focused on the railway station, waterfront (Note: This would include the Royal Navy Museum and a new leisure centre.) and Church Street. Northern School of Art also has funds for a TV and film studios.

On 2 August 2024, far-right activists and others attacked police, threw stones at a mosque and looted shops after anti-immigrant misinformation was spread on social media.

== Governance ==
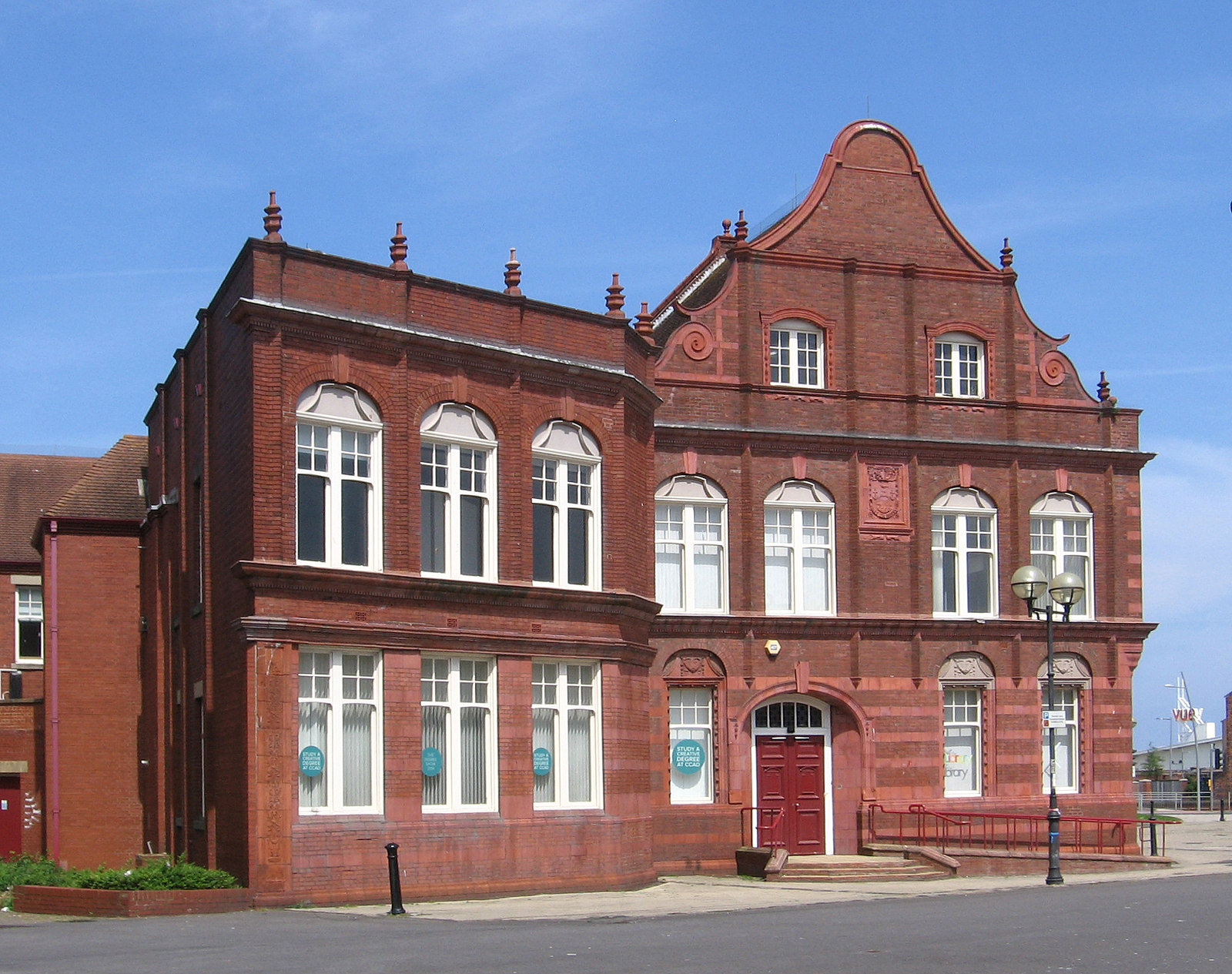
Municipal Buildings, Church Square: Headquarters of West Hartlepool Borough Council from 1889, then of the enlarged Hartlepool Borough Council from 1967. It was replaced by a new civic centre on Victoria Road in the 1970s

There is one main tier of local government covering Hartlepool, at unitary authority level: Hartlepool Borough Council. There is a civil parish covering Headland, which forms an additional tier of local government for that area; most of the rest of the urban area is an unparished area. The borough council is a constituent member of the Tees Valley Combined Authority, led by the directly elected Tees Valley Mayor, and is based at the civic centre on Victoria Road.

Hartlepool was historically a township in the ancient parish of Hart; it was also an ancient borough, having been granted a charter by King John in 1200. The borough was reformed to become a municipal borough in 1850. The council built Hartlepool Borough Hall to serve as its headquarters, being completed in 1866.

West Hartlepool was laid out on land outside the town's historic borough boundaries, in the neighbouring parish of Stranton. A body of improvement commissioners was established to administer the new town in 1854. The commissioners were superseded in 1887, when West Hartlepool was also incorporated as a municipal borough. The new borough council built itself a headquarters at the Municipal Buildings on Church Square, which was completed in 1889. An events venue and public hall on Raby Road called West Hartlepool Town Hall was subsequently completed in 1897. In 1902, West Hartlepool was elevated to become a county borough, making it independent from Durham County Council. The old Hartlepool Borough Council amalgamated with West Hartlepool Borough Council in 1967 to form a county borough called Hartlepool.

In 1974, the borough was enlarged to take in eight neighbouring parishes and was transferred to the new county of Cleveland. Cleveland was abolished in 1996 following the Banham Review, which gave unitary authority status to its four districts, including Hartlepool. The borough was restored to County Durham for ceremonial purposes under the Lieutenancies Act 1997, but as a unitary authority it is independent from Durham County Council.

=== Council ===
After boundary changes introduced in 2019, the borough is now divided into 12 electoral wards, each of which elects three councillors who make up the 36 councillors of the borough council.

The twelve wards of Hartlepool Borough Council
Burn Valley	De Brus	Fens & Greatham	Foggy Furze
Hart	Headland & Harbour	Throston	Manor House
Rural West	Seaton	Victoria	Rossmere

=== Members of Parliament ===
Hartlepool is represented in the House of Commons by one Member of Parliament, currently Jonathan Brash of the Labour Party; he was elected at the 2024 general election, with 46.2% of the vote.

MPs for Hartlepool since 1945 have been:

Colour key
Conservative Party
Labour Party

Name	Term of office	Government offices held
David Thomas Jones	1945–59	
John Simon Kerans	1959–64	
Edward Leadbitter	1964–92	
Peter Mandelson	1992–2004	* Secretary of State for Northern Ireland (11 October 1999–24 January 2001) * Secretary of State for Trade and Industry (27 July 1998–23 December 1998) * Minister without Portfolio (2 May 1997–27 July 1998)
Iain Wright	2004–17	* Parliamentary Under Secretary of State for 14–19 Reform and Apprenticeships (9 June 2009 – 11 May 2010)
Mike Hill	2017–21	
Jill Mortimer	2021–24	
Jonathan Brash	2024–present	

Mandelson, the MP between 1992 and 2004, resigned to take up a role in the European Commission. On 13 October 2008, he was created Baron Mandelson of Foy and Hartlepool following his appointment as Secretary of State for Business, Enterprise and Regulatory Reform in the British Government.

=== Emergency services ===
Hartlepool falls within the jurisdiction of Cleveland Fire Brigade and Cleveland Police. Before 1974, it was under the jurisdiction of the Durham Constabulary and Durham Fire Brigade. Hartlepool has two fire stations: a full-time station at Stranton and a retained station on the Headland.

== Geography ==
Place	Distance	Direction	Relation
Darlington	18 mi (29 km)	South-west	Combined Authority area
Sunderland	17 mi (27 km)	North	Largest settlement in the historic county of Durham
Durham	16 mi (26 km)	North	Historic county town and closest city
Stockton	9 mi (14 km)	South-west	Combined Authority area
Middlesbrough	8 mi (13 km)	South	Combined Authority area

Nearby towns include: Seaham (17 mi or 27 km), Sedgefield (13 mi or 21 km), Billingham (8 mi or 13 km) and Peterlee (8 mi or 13 km). Beyond the far side of the Tees Bay, on the other side of the river Tees, the distant monument on Eston Nab can be seen on clear days.

=== Climate ===
Hartlepool has an oceanic climate typical of Great Britain. The Köppen Climate Classification subtype for this climate is "Cfb"(Marine West Coast Climate).

Climate data for Hartlepool
Month	Jan	Feb	Mar	Apr	May	Jun	Jul	Aug	Sep	Oct	Nov	Dec	Year
Mean daily maximum °C (°F)	6 (43)	7 (44)	9 (48)	11 (52)	14 (58)	17 (63)	20 (68)	19 (67)	17 (62)	13 (55)	9 (48)	7 (45)	12 (54)
Mean daily minimum °C (°F)	1 (34)	1 (34)	2 (36)	3 (37)	6 (43)	8 (46)	11 (52)	11 (52)	9 (48)	6 (43)	3 (37)	2 (36)	6 (42)
Average precipitation mm (inches)	56 (2.21)	39 (1.53)	51 (2.01)	52 (2.05)	50 (1.95)	55 (2.16)	44 (1.75)	61 (2.41)	57 (2.26)	57 (2.24)	61 (2.42)	59 (2.33)	643 (25.32)

== Economy ==
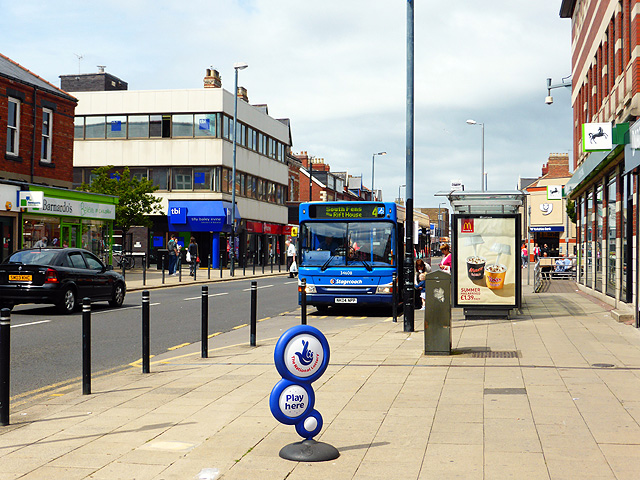
York Road

Hartlepool's economy has historically been linked with the maritime industry, something which is still at the heart of local business. Hartlepool Dock is owned and run by PD Ports. Engineering related jobs employ around 1700 people. Tata Steel Europe employ around 350 people in the manufacture of steel tubes, predominantly for the oil industry. South of the town on the banks of the Tees, Able UK operates the Teesside Environmental Reclamation and Recycling Centre (TERRC), a large scale marine recycling facility and dry dock. Adjacent to the east of TERRC is the Hartlepool nuclear power station, an advanced gas-cooled reactor (AGR) type nuclear power plant opened in the 1980s. It is the single largest employer in the town, employing 1% of the town's working age people.

The chemicals industry is important to the local economy. Companies include Huntsman Corporation, who produce titanium dioxide for use in paints, Omya and Frutarom.

Tourism was worth £48 million to the town in 2009; this figure excludes the impact of the Tall Ships 2010. Hartlepool's historic links to the maritime industry are centred on the Maritime Experience, and the supporting exhibits PS Wingfield Castle and HMS Trincomalee.

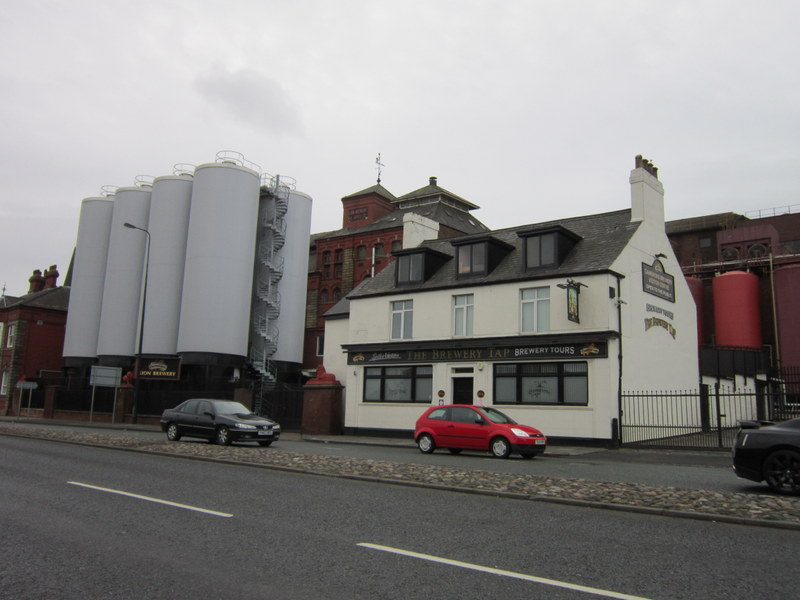
Camerons Brewery

Camerons Brewery was founded in 1852 and currently employs around 145 people. It is one of the largest breweries in the UK. Following a series of acquisitions, it came under the control of the Castle Eden Brewery in 2001, which merged the two breweries, closing down the Castle Eden plant. It brews a range of cask and bottled beers, including Strongarm, a 4% abv bitter. The brewery is heavily engaged in contract brewing such beers as Kronenbourg 1664, John Smith's and Foster's.

Orchid Drinks of Hartlepool were formed in 1992 after a management buy out of the soft drinks arm of Camerons, which manufactured Purdey's and Amé. Following a £67 million takeover by Britvic, the site was closed down in 2009.

Middleton Grange Shopping Centre is the main shopping location. 2800 people are employed in retail. The ten major retail companies in the town are Tesco, Morrisons, Asda, Next, Argos, Marks & Spencer, Aldi, Boots and Matalan. Aside from the local sports clubs, other local entertainment venues include a VUE Cinema and Mecca Bingo.

Companies that have moved operations to the town for the offshore wind farm include Siemens Energy and Van Oord.

== Education ==
=== Secondary ===
Hartlepool has five secondary schools:

- Dyke House Academy
- English Martyrs School and Sixth Form College
- High Tunstall College of Science
- Manor Community Academy
- St Hild's Church of England School.

The town had planned to receive funding from central government to improve school buildings and facilities as a part of the Building Schools for the Future programme, but this was cancelled because of government spending cuts.

=== Colleges ===
Hartlepool College of Further Education is an educational establishment located in the centre of the town, which has existed in various forms for over a century. Its former 1960s campus was replaced by a £52million custom-designed building, which opened in September 2011.

The town also has Hartlepool Sixth Form College. A former grammar and comprehensive school, the college provides a number of AS and A2 Level student courses. The English Martyrs School and Sixth Form College also offers AS, A2 and other BTEC qualification to 16- to 18-year-olds from Hartlepool and beyond.

A campus of The Northern School of Art is a specialist art and design college and higher education, located adjacent to the art gallery on Church Square. The college also has a further education site in Middlesbrough.

== Transport ==
=== Railway ===
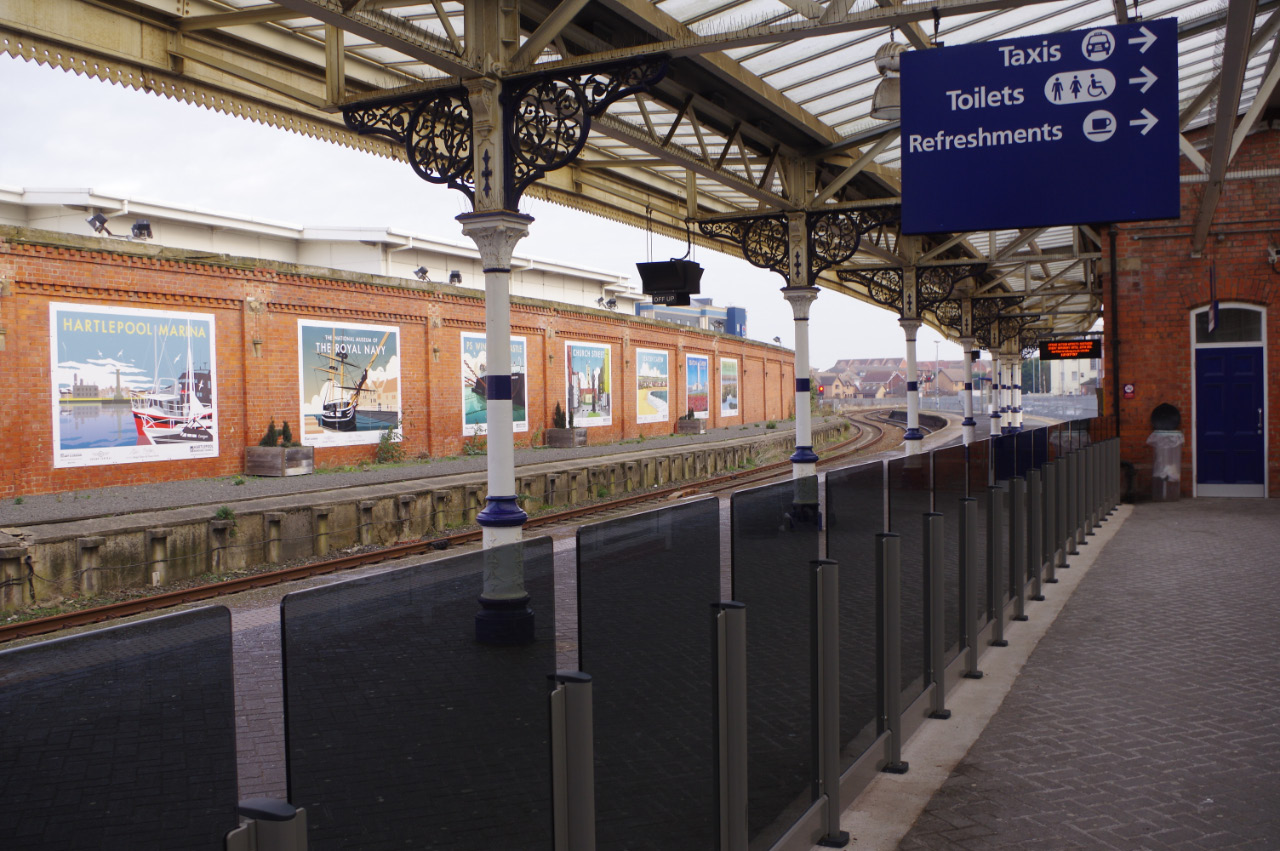
Hartlepool station

Hartlepool is served by two train operating companies:

- Northern Trains operates an hourly service on the Durham Coast Line to Sunderland, Newcastle, Middlesbrough and Nunthorpe; Seaton Carew is also a stop on this line
- Grand Central operates an approximately two-hourly service between London King's Cross and Sunderland.

=== Buses ===
Local bus routes are operated predominately by Stagecoach North East; services connect Hartlepool with Billingham, Stockton-on-Tees, Middlesbrough, Seaton Carew and Port Clarence. Arriva North East operates routes to Peterlee and Durham.

=== Roads ===
The town is served by two major roads:

- A179, which leads north-west to the A19, Durham, Sunderland and South Tyneside
- A689, travels south-west towards the A19, Billingham, Stockton-on-Tees, Middlesbrough and York.

=== Sea ===
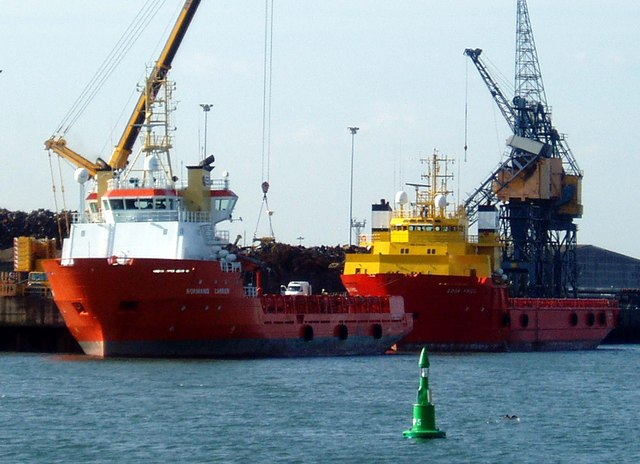
Offshore supply vessels in Hartlepool docks

Hartlepool has been a major sea port almost since it was founded and has a long fishing heritage. During the industrial revolution, massive new docks were created on the southern side of the channel running below the Headland, which gave rise to the town of West Hartlepool. Now owned by PD Ports, the docks are still in use today and still capable of handling large vessels. However, a large portion of the former dockland was converted into a marina capable of berthing 500 vessels. Hartlepool Marina is home to a wide variety of pleasure and working craft, with passage to and from the sea through a lock.

Hartlepool Lifeboat Station is operated by the Royal National Lifeboat Institution.

== Religion ==
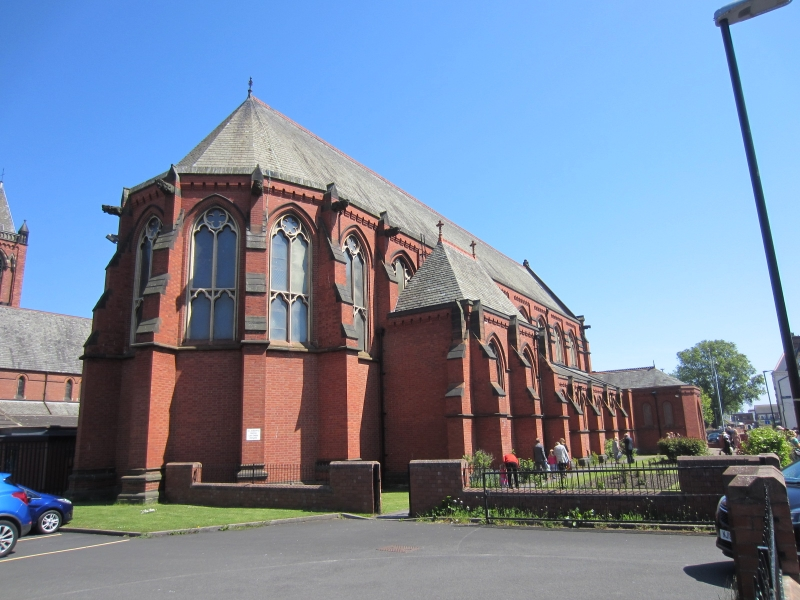
St Joseph's RC Church

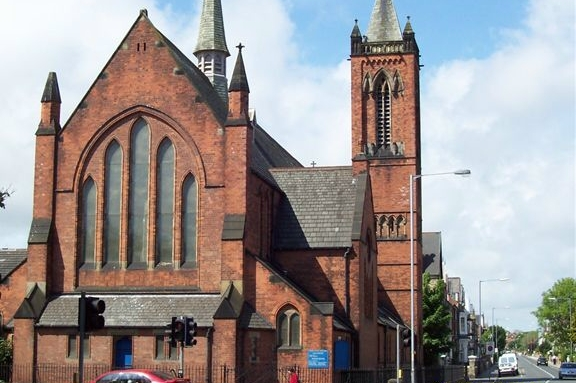
St Paul's CoE Church

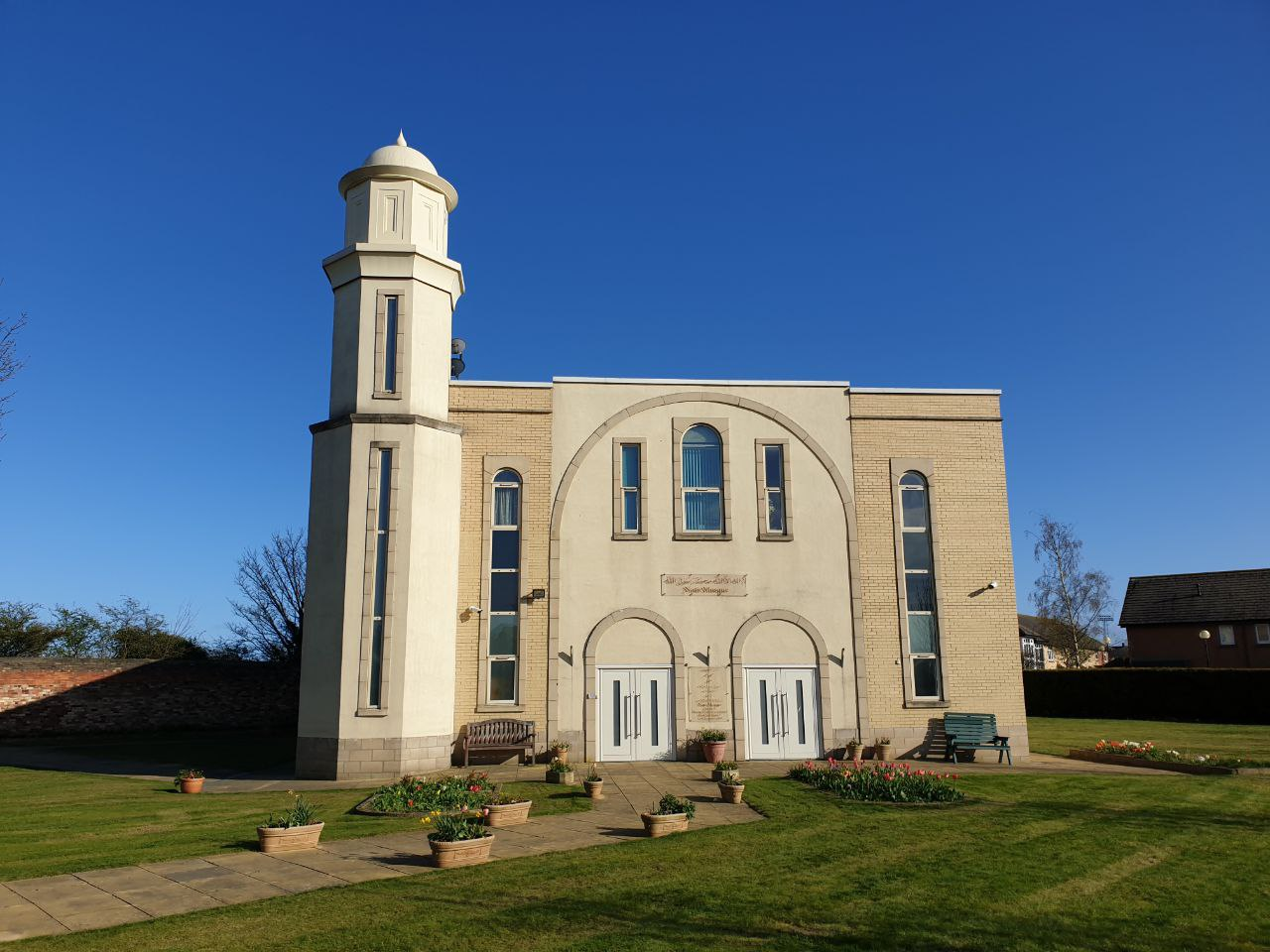
Nasir Mosque

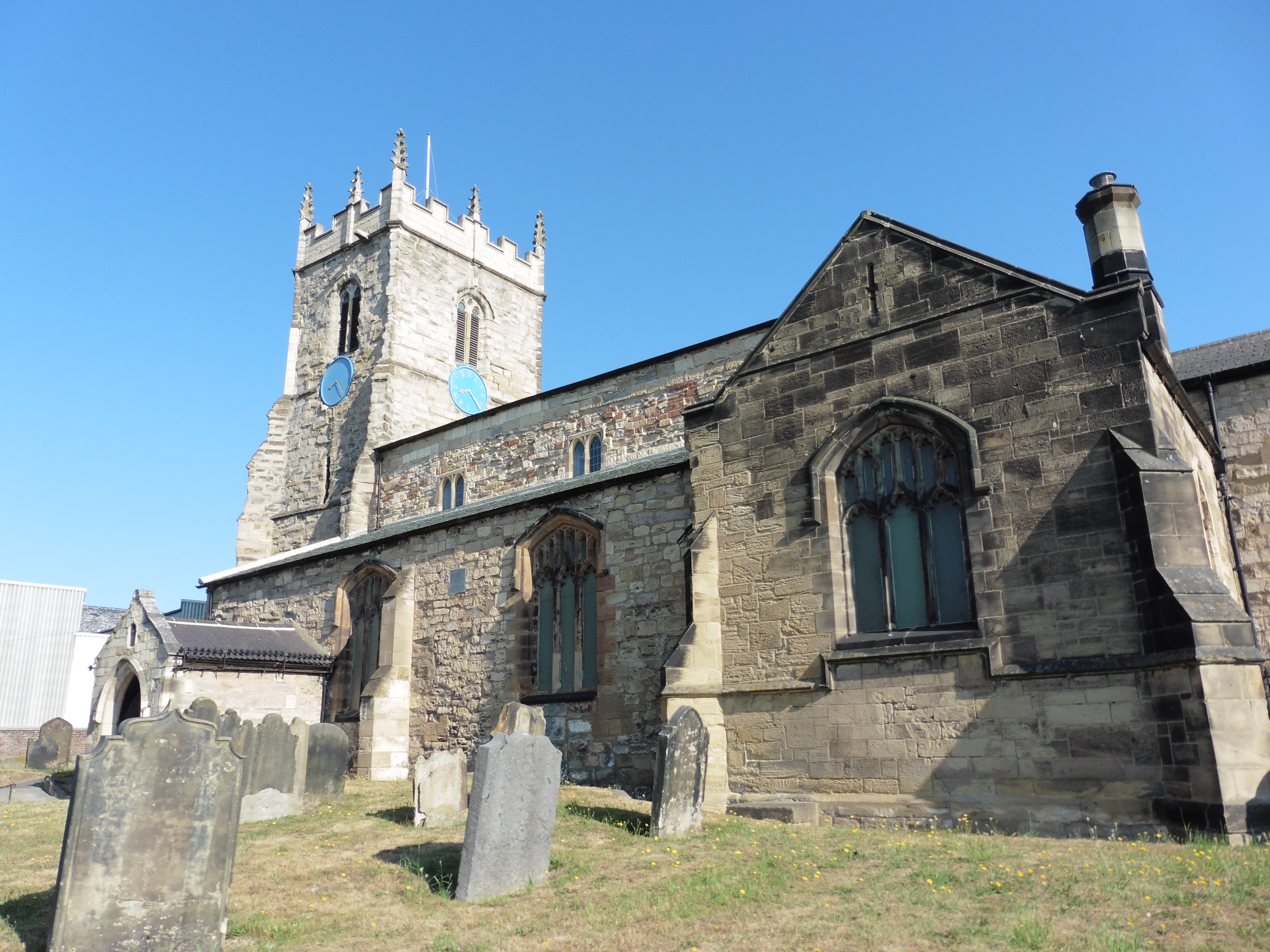
All Saints' Church, Stranton

They are several Church of England and Roman Catholic churches in the town. St Hilda's Church is a notable church of the town, it was built on Hartlepool Abbey and sits upon a high point of the Headland. The churches of the Church of England's St Paul and Roman Catholic's St Joseph are next to each other on St Paul's Road. Nasir Mosque is sited on Brougham Terrace.

Church	Churches belong to	Churches
Church of England	Deanery of Hartlepool; Archdeaconry of Auckland; Diocese of Durham; Province of York	Christ Church (deconsecrated); Holy Trinity; St Aidan; St Columba; St Hilda; St Luke; St Oswald; St Paul
Roman Catholic	Holy Family parish Hilda partnership Diocese of Hexham and Newcastle; Archdiocese of Liverpool	St Cuthbert; St John Vianney; St Joseph; St Patrick; St Thomas More; St Mary

== Culture and community ==
=== Festivals and fairs ===
Since November 2014, the Headland has hosted the annual Wintertide Festival, which is a weekend long event that starts with a community parade on the Friday and culminating in a finale performance and fireworks display on the Sunday.

==== Tall Ships' Races ====
On 28 June 2006, Hartlepool celebrated after winning its bid to host The Tall Ships' Races. The town welcomed up to 125 tall ships in 2010, after being chosen by race organiser Sail Training International to be the finishing point for the race. Hartlepool greeted the ships, which sailed from Kristiansand in Norway on the second and final leg of the race. Hartlepool also hosted the race in July 2023. It was the first stop after starting at Den Helder (Netherlands).

=== Museums, art galleries and libraries ===
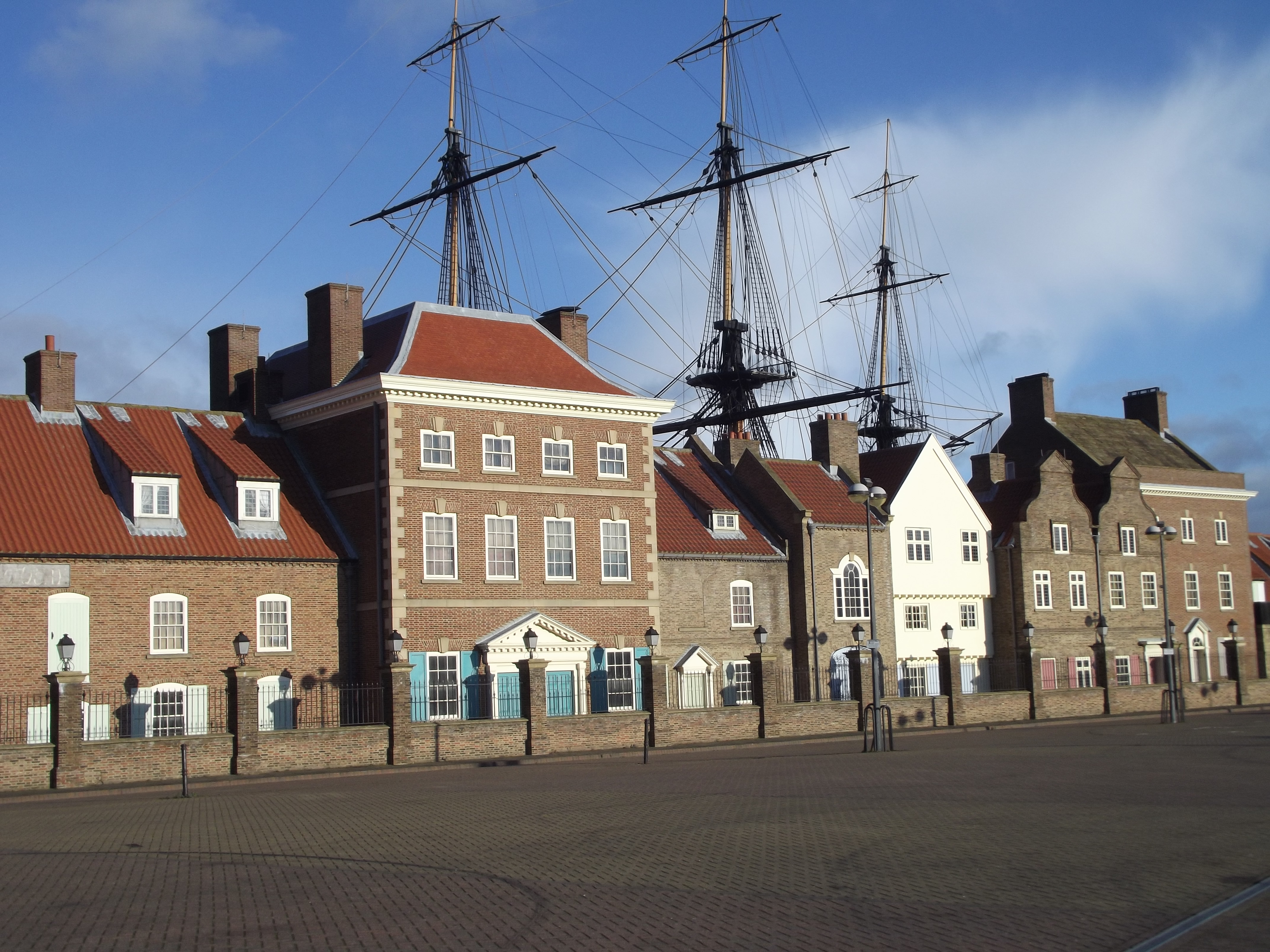
National Museum of the Royal Navy

Hartlepool is home to a National Museum of the Royal Navy, known as NMRN Hartlepool. Previously known simply as The Historic Quay and Hartlepool's Maritime Experience, the museum is a re-creation of an 18th-century seaport with the exhibition centre-piece being a sailing frigate, HMS Trincomalee. The complex also includes the Museum of Hartlepool.

Hartlepool Art Gallery is located in Church Square within Christ Church, a restored Victorian church, built in 1854 and designed by the architect Edward Buckton Lamb (1806–1869). The gallery's temporary exhibitions change frequently and feature works from local artists and the permanent Fine Art Collection, which was established by Sir William Gray. The gallery also houses the Hartlepool tourist information centre.

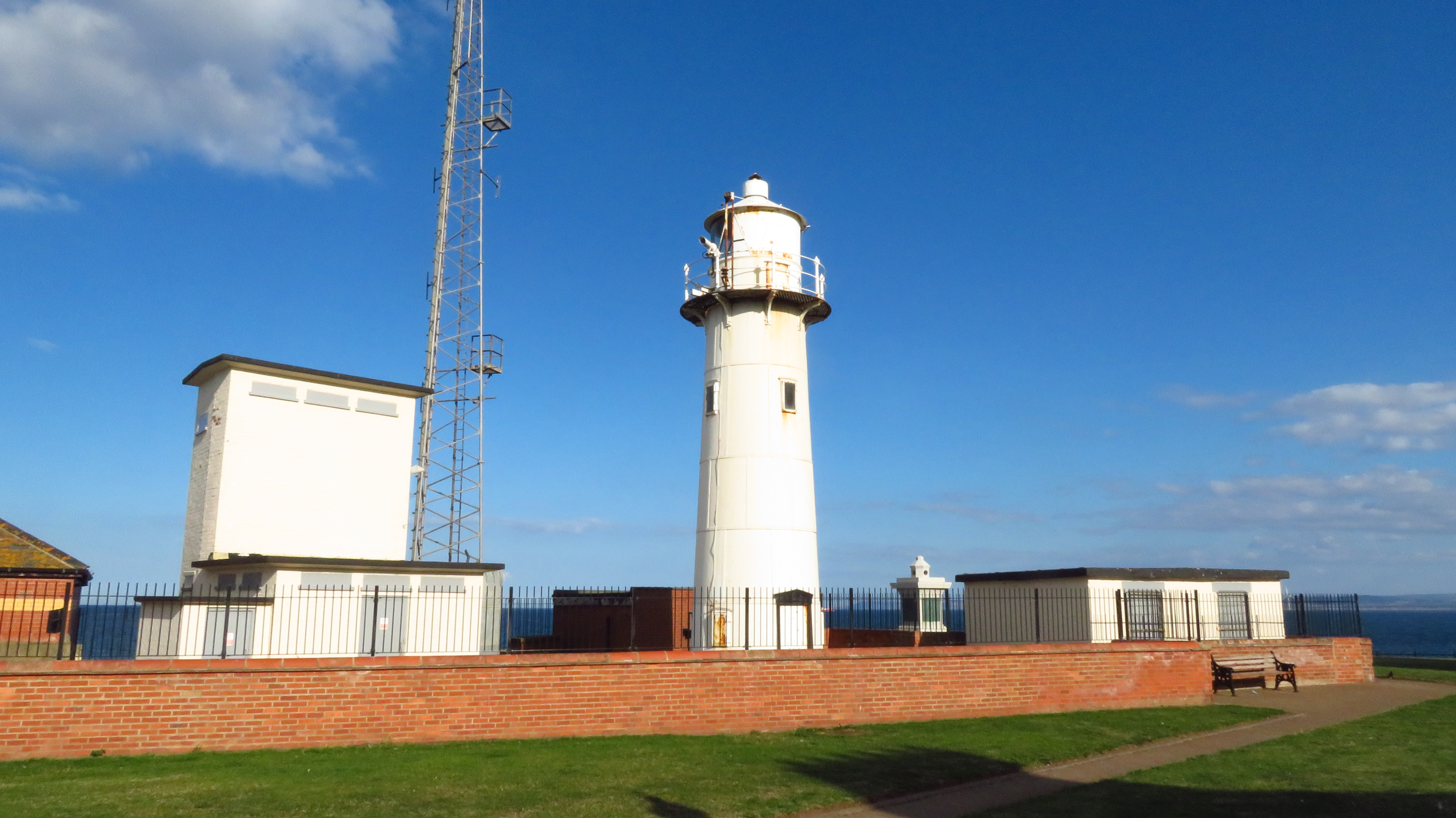
The Heugh Battery Museum

The Heugh Battery Museum is located on the Headland. It was one of three batteries erected to protect Hartlepool's port in 1860. The battery was closed in 1956 and is now in the care of the Heugh Gun Battery Trust and home to an artillery collection.

Willows was the Hartlepool mansion of the influential Sir William Gray of William Gray & Company and he gifted it to the town in 1920, after which it was converted to be the town's first museum and art gallery. Fondly known locally as "The Gray", it was closed as a museum in 1994 and now houses the local authority's culture department.

There are six libraries in Hartlepool, the primary one being the Community Hub Central Library. Others are Throston Grange Library, Community Hub North Library, Seaton Carew Library, Owton Manor Library and Headland Branch Library.

== Media ==
- Hartlepool Life - free local newspaper
- Hartlepool Mail – local newspaper
- BBC Radio Tees – BBC local radio station
- Radio Hartlepool – Community radio station
- Local television news programmes are BBC Look North and ITV News Tyne Tees.

== Sport ==
=== Football ===
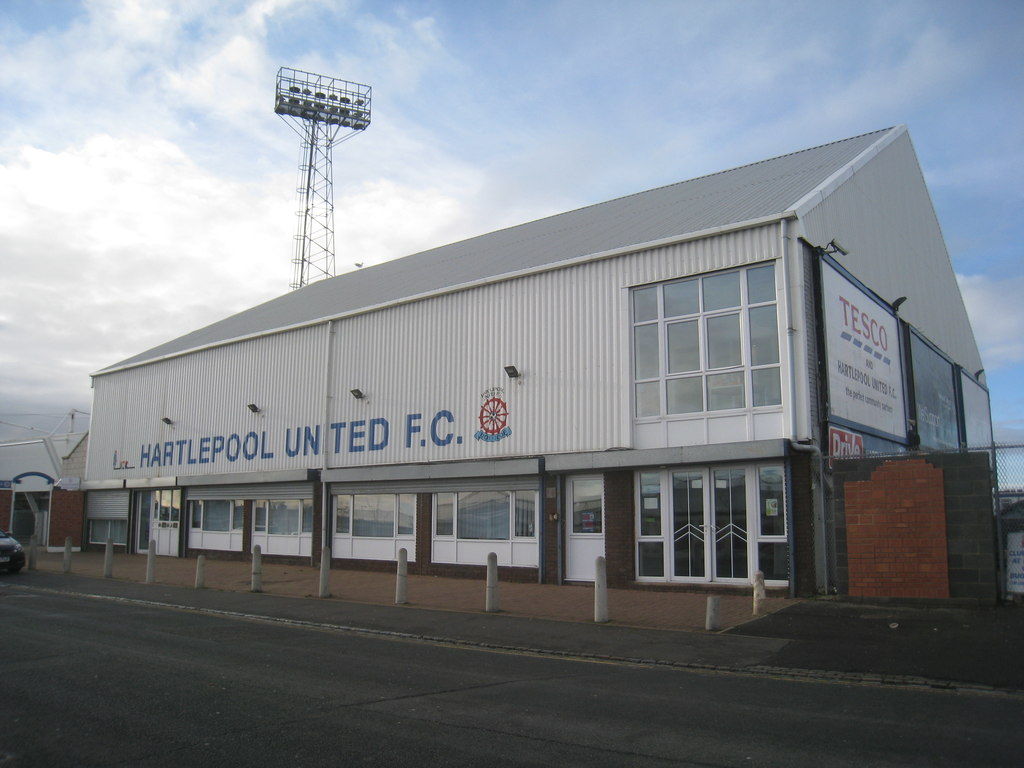
Victoria Park

Hartlepool United is the town's professional football club, which plays at Victoria Park. The club currently plays in the National League. Pools are affiliated with a women's team called Hartlepool United FC Women. It was formed in 2015 and currently plays in the North East Regional Women's Football League. Supporters of Hartlepool United bear the nickname of the "Monkey Hangers", which is based upon the local legend.

The town also has a semi-professional football club, FC Hartlepool, which play in Northern League Division Two.

=== Rugby union ===
Hartlepool is something of an anomaly in England having historically maintained a disproportionate number of clubs in a town of only c.90,000 inhabitants. These include(d) West Hartlepool, Hartlepool Rovers, Hartlepool Athletic RFC, Hartlepool Boys Brigade Old Boys RFC (BBOB), Seaton Carew RUFC (formerly Hartlepool Grammar School Old Boys), West Hartlepool Technical Day School Old Boys RUFC (TDSOB or Tech) and Hartlepool Old Boys' RFC (Hartlepool). Starting in 1904 clubs within 8 mi (13 km) of the headland were eligible to compete for the Pyman Cup which has been contested regularly since and that the Hartlepool & District Union continue to organise.

Perhaps the best known club outside the town is West Hartlepool R.F.C. which achieved promotion to what is now the Premiership in 1992; it competed in the 1992–93, 1994–95, 1995–96 and 1996–97 seasons. This success came at a price as soon after West was then hit by bankruptcy and controversially sold their Brierton Lane stadium and pitch to former sponsor Yuills Homes. There then followed a succession of relegations before the club stabilised in the Durham/Northumberland leagues. West and Rovers continue to play one another in a popular Boxing Day fixture which traditionally draws a large crowd.

Hartlepool Rovers, formed in 1879, who played at the Old Friarage in the Headland area of Hartlepool before moving to West View Road. In the 1890s Rovers supplied numerous county, divisional and international players. The club itself hosted many high-profile matches including the inaugural Barbarians F.C. match in 1890, the New Zealand Maoris in 1888 and the legendary All Blacks, who played against a combined Hartlepool Club team in 1905. In the 1911–12 season, Hartlepool Rovers broke the world record for the number of points scored in a season, racking up 860 points including 122 tries, 87 conversions, five penalties and 11 drop goals.

Although it ceased competing in the RFU leagues in 2008–09, West Hartlepool TDSOB (Tech) continues to support town and County rugby with several of the town's other clubs having played at Grayfields when their own pitches were unavailable. Grayfields has also hosted a number of Durham County cup finals, as well as County under 16, 18 and 20 age group games.

=== Cricket ===
Hartlepool Cricket Club plays at Park Drive.

=== Field hockey ===
Hartlepool Caledonians & Billingham Hockey Club is a field hockey club that competes in the Yorkshire and North East Hockey League.

=== Boxing ===
At the 2012 Summer Olympics, 21-year-old Savannah Marshall, who attended English Martyrs School and Sixth Form College in the town of Hartlepool, competed in the Women's boxing tournament of the 2012 Olympic Games. She was defeated 12–6 by Marina Volnova of Kazakhstan in her opening, quarter-final bout. Marshall is now a professional boxer, currently unbeaten as a professional; on 31 October 2020, in her ninth professional fight, Marshall became the WBO female middleweight champion with a TKO victory over opponent Hannah Rankin at Wembley Arena.

=== Swimming ===
In August 2012, Jemma Lowe, a British record holder who attended High Tunstall College of Science in the town of Hartlepool, competed in the 2012 Olympic Games. She finished sixth in the 200-metre butterfly final, with a time of 58.06 seconds. She was also a member of the eighth-place British team in the 400m Medley relay.

== Army reserve ==
Situated in the New Armoury Centre, Easington Road, are the following units:

- Royal Marines Reserve
- 90 (North Riding) Signal Squadron.

== The legend of the Hartlepool monkey ==
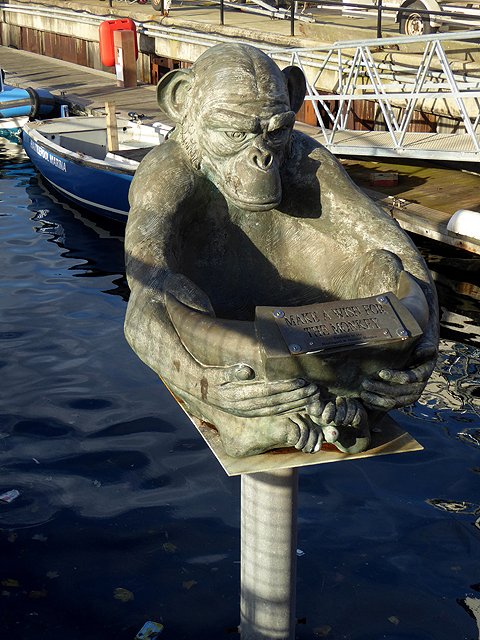
The Monkey statue in the marina

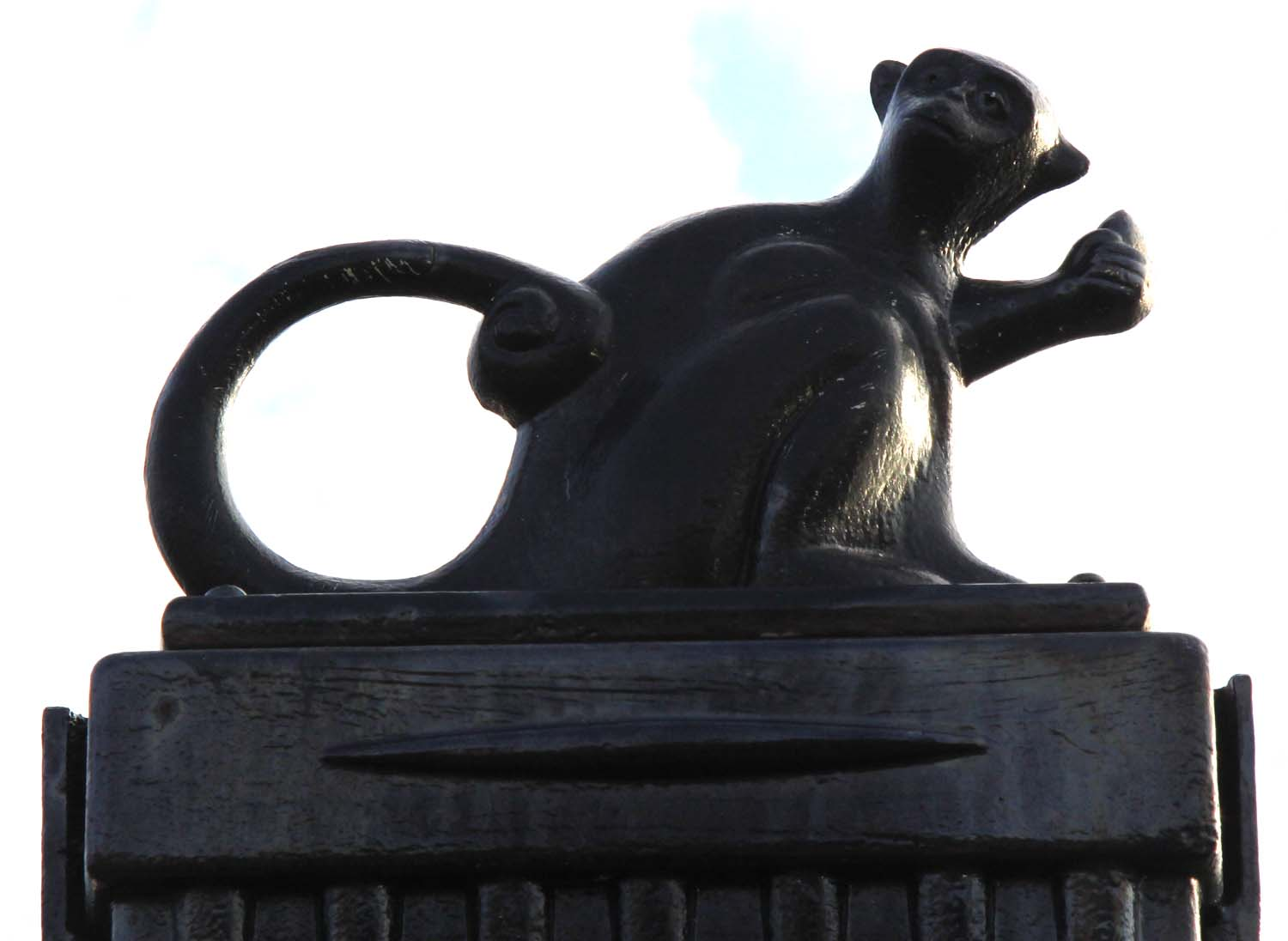
Another incarnation of the monkey

Hartlepool is known for allegedly executing a monkey during the Napoleonic Wars. According to legend, fishermen from Hartlepool watched a French warship founder off the coast; the only survivor was a monkey, which was dressed in French military uniform, presumably to amuse the officers on the ship. The fishermen assumed that this must be what Frenchmen looked like and, after a brief trial, summarily executed the monkey.

Historians have pointed to the prior existence of a Scottish folk song called "And the Boddamers hung the Monkey-O". It describes how a monkey survived a shipwreck off the village of Boddam near Peterhead in Aberdeenshire. Because the villagers could only claim salvage rights if there were no survivors from the wreck, they allegedly hanged the monkey. There is also an English folk song detailing the later event called, appropriately enough, "The Hartlepool Monkey". In the English version the monkey is hanged as a French spy.

"Monkey hanger" and "Chimp Choker" are common terms of (semi-friendly) abuse aimed at "Poolies", often from footballing rivals Darlington. The mascot of Hartlepool United F.C. is H'Angus the monkey. The man in the monkey costume, Stuart Drummond, stood for the post of mayor in 2002 as H'angus the monkey; he campaigned on a platform which included free bananas for school children. To widespread surprise, he won, becoming the first directly elected mayor of Hartlepool, winning 7,400 votes with a 52% share of the vote and a turnout of 30%. He was re-elected by a landslide in 2005, winning 16,912 on a turnout of 51%; 10,000 votes more than his nearest rival, the Labour candidate.

The monkey legend is also linked with two of the town's sports clubs: Hartlepool Rovers RFC, which uses the hanging monkey as the club logo; Hartlepool (Old Boys) RFC uses a hanging monkey kicking a rugby ball as their tie crest.

== Notable residents ==
- Michael Brown, former Premier League footballer
- Brian Clough, football manager who lived in the Fens estate in town while manager of Hartlepools United
- John Darwin, convicted fraudster who faked his own death
- Pete Donaldson, London radio DJ and podcast host
- David Eagle, comedian and musician with the band The Young'uns
- Janick Gers, guitarist from British heavy metal band Iron Maiden
- Jack Howe, former England international footballer
- Liam Howe, music producer and songwriter for several artists and member of the band Sneaker Pimps
- Andy Linighan, former Arsenal footballer who scored the winning goal in the 1993 FA Cup Final
- Savannah Marshall, professional boxer
- Stephanie Aird, comedian and television personality
- Jim Parker, composer
- Guy Pearce, film actor, lived in the town when he was younger as his mother was from the town
- Narbi Price, artist
- Jack Rowell, coached the England international rugby team and led them to the semi-final of the 1995 Rugby World Cup
- Graeme Scarratt, cricketer
- Wayne Sleep, dancer and actor, spent his childhood in the town
- Reg Smythe, cartoonist who created Andy Capp
- Jeremy Spencer, guitarist who was in the original Fleetwood Mac line-up
- Jeff Stelling, TV sport presenter and former host of Soccer Saturday
- Tomara Thomas, drag performer.

== Town twinning ==
Hartlepool is twinned with:

- Hückelhoven, Heinsberg, Germany (since 1973)
- Muskegon, Michigan, United States
- Sète, Hérault, France
- Sliema, Malta.

== Freedom of the Borough ==
The following people and military units have received the Freedom of the Borough of Hartlepool:

=== Individuals ===
- Peter Mandelson: 16 November 2009, but revoked on 2 October 2025
- Jeff Stelling: 16 November 2009
- Savannah Marshall: 19 March 2024.

=== Military Units ===
- The Rifles: 19 March 2015
- HM Coastguard (Hartlepool Coastguard Rescue Team): 19 March 2024.
