= Durham Pride UK =

Annual LGBTQ festival in Durham, England

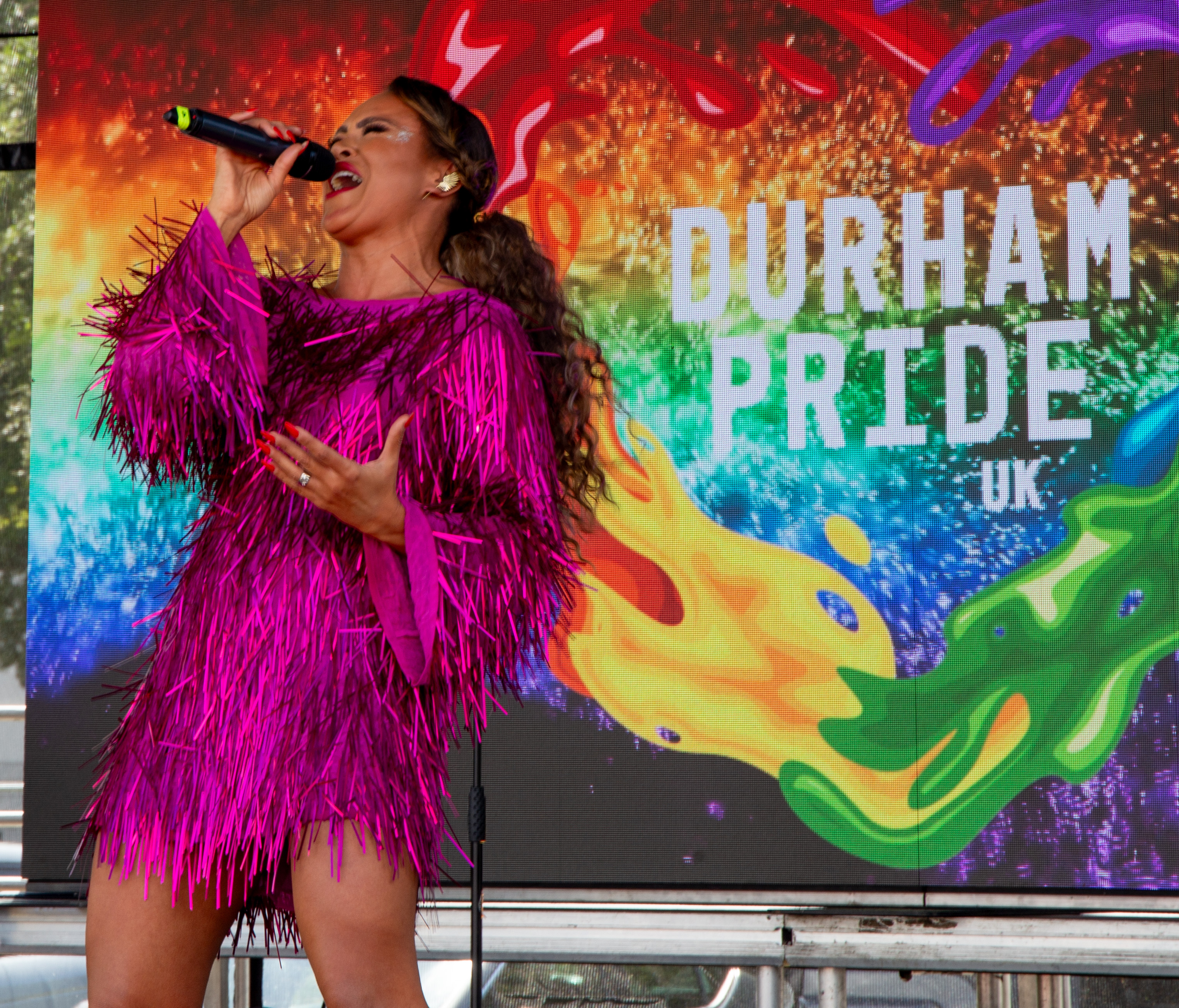
- Zoe Birkett performing at Durham Pride 2025
- Frequency: Annual
- Locations: Durham, County Durham, England
- Inaugurated: 2014
- Most recent: 30 May 2026
- Founder and chair: Mel Metcalf
- Website: durhamprideuk.org

Durham Pride UK is an annual LGBTQ pride event and charitable incorporated organisation in the city of Durham, County Durham, England. Beginning in 2014 after its founding by Mel Metcalf, it has continued since 2026 with the support of British trade unions after its funding from Reform-led Durham County Council was dropped.

== History ==
=== 2014–19: Establishment and first events ===
Durham Pride UK was founded by Mel Metcalf, and had its first event in 2014. It registered as a charitable incorporated organisation in January 2015, with Metcalf as chair. Durham nightclub Loveshack hosted the event's after-parties until its closure in 2017. In 2016, Durham County Council began funding Durham Pride with £2,500 per year, and would continue to do so until 2026. Acts at the 2016 event's after-party included the Cheeky Girls and Basshunter.

At Durham Pride 2017, on 28–29 May, the parade was expected to meet at Durham Cathedral, observe a minute's silence in honour of the victims of the then-recent terror attack in Manchester, and then march to The Sands, which hosted a family funfair as well as stages. Scheduled performers across the event included Jedward, Big Brovaz, Booty Luv, Kelly Llorenna, Karen Parry, Rebecca Rudd, Micky Modelle, Stooshe, and Amelia Lily, as well as local drag performers Tess Tickle and the Dragettes. That year, organisers cancelled the appearance of a white woman, Leanne Harper, who had previously been accused of making her skin look darker for her performance as a Beyoncé tribute act after an open letter was published by UK Black Pride arguing this was blackface, and local minority societies at Durham University said they would not attend the event. Harper had initially apologised and agreed to perform without darkening her skin, and said she received abuse and death threats.

=== 2020–25: Continued operations ===
Durham Pride was postponed in 2020 and 2021 due to the COVID-19 pandemic. The event in 2022, held on May 28–29, was attended by thousands of people, and had a stated intention of celebrating "120 years of the combined history of Fabulous Queens" as it was held a week prior to the Platinum Jubilee of Elizabeth II. Performing drag queens included Tess Tickle and Kitty Scott-Claus, with musical performers including Duncan James. Later in 2022, founder and chair Mel Metcalf and the Durham Pride committee were honoured in the House of Commons for establishing the event by Durham Labour MP Mary Kelly Foy. She also chaired an early day motion to show support for Durham Pride 2022 which was signed by 13 MPs from different political parties including Kate Osborne. Durham Pride 2023 took place from May 27–28, and was attended by 20,000 people. Its parade again began from Durham Cathedral, after speeches including one from Mary Kelly Foy. Signs at the event included support for the LGBTQ community in Russia. Performers included Nadine Coyle, Tess Tickle and the Dragettes, Jaymi Hensley, Karen Parry, and Northern Proud Voices. There was a thunderstorm during the Durham Pride 2024 parade, though it went ahead with marchers including Beamish Museum. Performers at the Sands included Aston Merrygold, George Shelley, and Tess Tickle and The Dragettes.

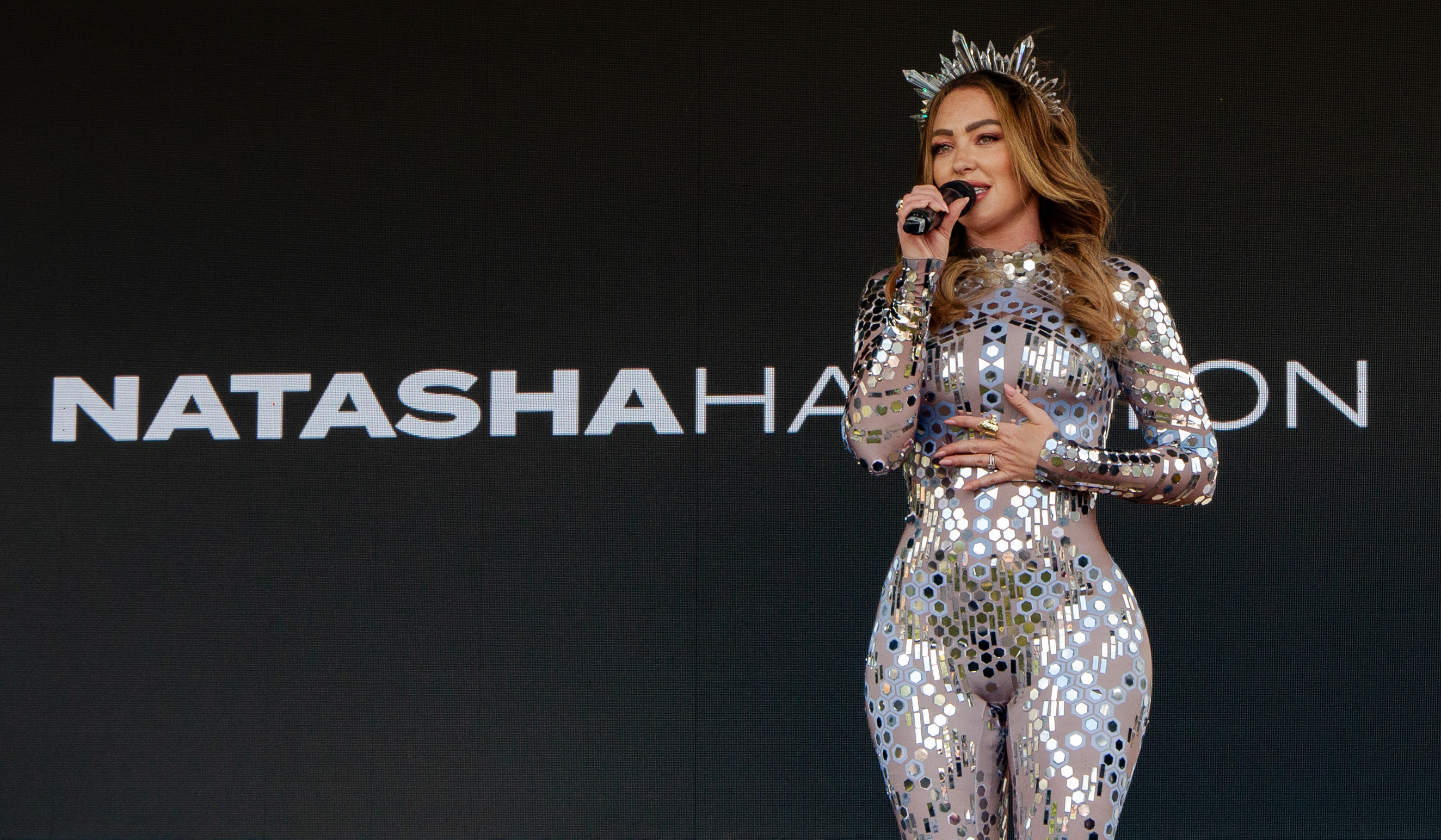
Natasha Hamilton performing at Durham Pride UK 2025

Durham Pride 2025 was funded by its annual £2,500 from Durham County Council as well as an additional £10,000 previously awarded to the council by the Arts Council through the National Lottery for its unsuccessful UK City of Culture bid. It allocated this latter funding to a three-year programme of extra events. The Wednesday 21 May prior to that year's event, the rainbow flag usually flown during Pride week at Durham's County Hall, which had been put up that Monday 19 May, was taken down by the new Reform UK council administration and replaced with a flag of St George. This was one of Reform's first actions in power after that year's council election. Reform's leader in the council as well as the council's deputy leader, Darren Grimes, argued that he was not anti-gay but "anti-tokenism". Metcalf responded that "we are of course disappointed", and vowed that Pride would continue in the city every year. Over 6,000 people were expected to attend that weekend's event, which was held on 24–25 May.

=== 2025–present: Switch from council to trade union funding and increased attendance ===
In August 2025, Grimes wrote that the local authority would divert funding away from Durham Pride UK and toward "key services" instead, tweeting that it had "morphed into a travelling billboard for gender ideology and political activism that many in the gay community – myself included – want no part of". The Durham Miners' Association (DMA) responded negatively to the announcement, with its chairman Stephen Guy calling for the trade union movement "to ramp up support for Durham Pride" and stating that "Reform councillors across County Durham have underestimated the resolve of the LGBT+ community and the support of allies across the trade union movement." Similarly, the Trades Union Congress (TUC) North East, Yorkshire & Humber regional secretary Dave Pike accused Reform UK of "promoting division" and said he was "proud to stand alongside the LGBT+ community in Durham". Durham Pride thus began working with the DMA and the Trades Union Congress (TUC) to finance its future events. A fundraising event was expected to be held at Durham Miners' Hall on 5 September 2025. Fundraising from the Coal Industry Social Welfare Organisation, TUC, DMA, trade unions, and popular support raised around £25,000 for Durham Pride 2026, which Metcalf attributed to Reform's decision to cut the council's funding. The TUC and DMA fundraiser gathered over £8,400 for the event. One of the biggest single donations was from performing arts union Equity, with £7,200. The event was launched at the Radisson Blu hotel in the city on 14 May 2026, and Durham Castle said it would raise a rainbow flag for the event the same day.

Durham Pride 2026 was the biggest in its history due to the support of trade unions representing miners, postal workers, and train drivers; The Guardian reported that "rainbow flags were almost matched in number by trade union banners". These included marchers from the National Union of Mineworkers, ASLEF, Unite, the CWU, and teachers' union NASUWT. Stephen Guy said the support was a continuation of a relationship that began when during the 1980s miners' strikes the LGBTQ community "not only raised funds for us, but came to our communities, uplifted our spirits when they were down, and showed their solidarity." The march, on 30 May, began from Palace Green and followed a route through Market Place and Claypath and looping through Providence Row and Freemans Place to The Sands. The event's performances were headlined by Claire Richards. In return for the unions' support, LGBTQ community members pledged their attendance at the 140th Durham Miners' Gala that July.
