= 2025 Durham County Council election =

2025 English local election

- 1 May 2025

All 98 seats on Durham County Council 50 seats needed for a majority
- Turnout: 34.8% (▼1.6 pp)

	First party	Second party	Third party
Leader	Andrew Husband	Amanda Hopgood	(Note: Prior to the election, 9 of the independents formed the Durham County Council Independent Group (led by John Shuttleworth), 6 sat as part of the Durham Group (led by Derwentside Independents councillor Alan Shield), 5 formed the County Durham Independent Group (led by Paul Sexton), 3 formed the Unaligned Group (led by Karen Hawley), 2 formed the Spennymoor and Tudhoe Independent Group (led by Liz Maddison), and the other 4 did not belong to any group.)
Party	Reform	Liberal Democrats	Independent
Leader's seat	Chester-le-Street North	Framwellgate and Newton Hall
Last election	0 seats, 0.1%	17 seats, 12.4%	22 seats, 16.6%
Seats before	0 (Note: Notional 2021 results.)	13	26
Seats won	65	14	12
Seat change	▲65 (Note: Boundary changes reduced the number of seats, so these are notional changes.)	▲1	▼14
Popular vote	54,655	18,644	17,595
Percentage	34.4%	11.7%	12.0%
Swing	▲34.3%	▼0.5%	▼5.5%
	Fourth party	Fifth party	Sixth party
Leader	Carl Marshall	(Note: Prior to the election, the Green Party councillor formed part of the Durham Group, led by Derwentside Independents councillor Alan Shield.)	Richard Bell
Party	Labour	Green	Conservative
Leader's seat	Stanley (defeated)		Upper Teesdale
Last election	53 seats, 37.8%	1 seats, 3.8%	24 seats, 26.8%
Seats before	42	1	16
Seats won	4	2	1
Seat change	▼38	▲1	▼15
Popular vote	31,098	7,682	11,790
Percentage	19.5%	4.8%	7.4%
Swing	▼14.0%	▲1.0%	▼19.4%

- Composition of the council
Leader before election
Amanda Hopgood
Liberal Democrat
No overall control
Leader after election
Andrew Husband
Reform

The 2025 Durham County Council election took place on 1 May 2025 to elect members to Durham County Council in County Durham, England. 98 seats were elected, a reduction from 126. This was on the same day as other local elections. The council was under no overall control prior to the election, being run by a Liberal Democrat-led coalition. The election saw Reform UK win a majority of the seats on the council.

== Background ==
At the 2021 election, the Labour Party lost overall control of the council for the first time in a century. Although Labour were the largest party after the 2021 election, a coalition of the Liberal Democrats, Conservatives, Derwentside Independents, Green Party and some of the independent councillors formed to run the council between 2021 and 2025, led by Liberal Democrat councillor Amanda Hopgood.

New division boundaries were drawn up to take effect for the 2025 election, reducing the number of seats on the council from 126 to 98.

In March 2025, a poll from Electoral Calculus for The Daily Telegraph - of all English local authorities with elections in May 2025 - projected that Reform UK would win outright control of, and hold a majority of seats on, the council following the election.

== Previous council composition ==
After 2021 election		Before 2025 election	
Party	Seats	Party	Seats
Labour	53	Labour	52
Conservative	24	Conservative	17
Liberal Democrats	17	Liberal Democrats	15
Derwentside Independents	5	Derwentside Independents	4
Reform	0	Reform	4
North East	4	North East	2
Green	1	Green	1
Independent	22	Independent	29
Vacant	N/A	Vacant	2

== Opinion polls ==
=== Seat projections ===
Date(s) conducted	Pollster	Client	Sample size	Area	Lab	Con	LD	Grn	Ref	Others
1 – 10 Mar 2025	Electoral Calculus	Daily Telegraph	5,421	GB	15	4	9	0	70	0
6 May 2021	2021 local elections		–	–	53	24	17	1	0	31

== Results summary ==
2025 Durham County Council election
Party	Candidates	Seats	Gains	Losses	Net gain/loss	Seats %	Votes %	Votes	+/−
Reform	97	65	65	0	▲65	66.3	34.4	54,655	▲34.3
Labour	98	4	0	38	▼38	4.1	19.5	31,098	▼14.0
Liberal Democrats	77	14	1	0	▲1	14.3	11.7	18,644	▼0.5
Independent	53	12	0	14	▼14	12.2	11.1	17,679	▼5.5
Conservative	73	1	0	15	▼15	1.0	7.4	11,790	▼19.4
Green	37	2	1	0	▲1	2.0	4.8	7,682	▲1.0
Derwentside Independents	5	0	N/A	N/A	N/A	-	1.1	1,686	▼2.2
Seaham Community Party	4	0	N/A	N/A	N/A	-	1.0	1,622	▼0.1
North East	4	0	N/A	N/A	N/A	-	0.6	972	▼1.0
SDP	1	0	N/A	N/A	N/A	-	0.1	83	New
UKIP	1	0	N/A	N/A	N/A	-	0.0	33	New

== Ward results ==
List of candidates

=== Annfield Plain and Tanfield ===
Annfield Plain and Tanfield (2 Seats)
Party	Candidate	Votes	%	±%
Reform	Karen Allison	1,404	47.3	
Reform	Darren Grimes	1,364	46.0	
Derwentside Independents	Joan Nicholson	659	22.2	
Labour	Olga Milburn	579	19.5	
Derwentside Independents	Joyce Charlton	574	19.3	
Labour	Jeanette Theresa Stephenson	512	17.3	
Green	Sarah Twigg	122	4.1	
Conservative	Kevin John Briggs	114	3.8	
Liberal Democrats	Sopha Phal	80	2.7	
Conservative	Garry Richardson	77	2.6	
Majority				
Turnout		2,982	36.4	

=== Aycliffe North and Middridge ===
Aycliffe North and Middridge (2 Seats)
Party	Candidate	Votes	%	±%
Liberal Democrats	Michael Stead*	1,001	34.1	
Reform	Tim McGuinness	999	34.0	
Reform	Clive Taylor-Sholl	887	30.2	
Liberal Democrats	Lindsey Aston	807	27.5	
Conservative	David Sutton-Lloyd	471	16.0	
Labour	Michael Edward Murphy	438	14.9	
Labour	Luke Ellis	419	14.3	
Conservative	Tony Stubbs	339	11.5	
Independent	Tony Beddard	106	3.6	
Independent	Dorothy Bowman	94	3.2	
Green	Jonathan Stephen Park	82	2.8	
Majority				
Turnout		2,939	34.2	
Liberal Democrats hold		Swing		
Reform gain from Conservative		Swing		

=== Aycliffe South ===
Aycliffe South (3 Seats)
Party	Candidate	Votes	%	±%
Reform	John William Grant	1,459	44.3	
Reform	Nicole Louise Brown	1,335	40.5	
Reform	Andrew Eales	1,287	39.0	
Labour	Jim Atkinson	667	20.2	
Conservative	Paul Howell	589	17.9	
Labour	John Joseph Clark	556	16.9	
Independent	Ken Robson	550	16.7	
Labour	Toyin Ogunyemi	396	12.0	
Independent	Martin Ashcroft	363	11.0	
Liberal Democrats	Kyle Robinson	331	10.0	
Independent	George Coulson Gray	305	9.3	
Liberal Democrats	Tunde Akinsanya	286	8.7	
Liberal Democrats	John Woodward	286	8.7	
Independent	Tony Armstrong	227	6.9	
Green	Neale Floyd Darryl Cooley	156	4.7	
Majority				
Turnout		3,314	29.0	

=== Barnard Castle ===
Barnard Castle (1 Seat)
Party	Candidate	Votes	%	±%
Labour	Chris Foote-Wood	456	30.8	
Reform	Christopher Paul Bewley	436	29.4	
Conservative	Ted Henderson	421	28.5	
Green	John Edward Hogg	97	6.6	
Liberal Democrats	Richard Huzzey	63	4.3	
Majority		20		
Turnout		1,479	35.6	
Labour hold		Swing		

=== Belmont ===
Belmont (2 Seats)
Party	Candidate	Votes	%	±%
Liberal Democrats	Lesley Mavin*	1,296	39.4	
Liberal Democrats	Eric Mavin*	1,256	38.2	
Reform	Christopher Elliott	1,026	31.2	
Reform	Steve Gilley	853	25.9	
Labour	Paul Thomas Finley	733	22.3	
Labour	Val Hawes	722	21.9	
Green	Joel Graham Thornton	306	9.3	
Conservative	Gary Parkin	158	4.8	
Majority				
Turnout		3,295	39.5	
Liberal Democrats hold		Swing		
Liberal Democrats hold		Swing		

=== Benfieldside ===
Benfieldside (2 Seats)
Party	Candidate	Votes	%	±%
Reform	Sandra Ruth Grindle	1,064	33.9	
Reform	Andrew James Kilburn	1,007	32.0	
Labour	Kevin Earley	879	28.0	
Independent	Stephen Robinson	783	24.9	
Independent	Peter Oliver	646	20.6	
Labour	Michael Wass	613	19.5	
Liberal Democrats	Terry Rooney	362	11.5	
Liberal Democrats	Joanne Nattrass	278	8.8	
Conservative	David Lowes	216	6.9	
Conservative	Dan Lowes	215	6.8	
Majority				
Turnout		3,153	39.6	

=== Bishop Auckland ===
Bishop Auckland (3 Seats)
Party	Candidate	Votes	%	±%
Reform	Lyndsey Fox	1,870	46.9	
Reform	John Paul Kinvig	1,713	42.9	
Reform	Tom Redmond	1,708	42.8	
Labour	Kelly Joanne Guest	949	23.8	
Labour	Tessa Fay Hope	945	23.7	
Labour	Michael Thomas Siddle	934	23.4	
Independent	Sam Zair	783	19.6	
Independent	Mike Harker	422	10.6	
Conservative	Luke Allan Holmes	413	10.4	
Conservative	James Peter Middleton	392	9.8	
Conservative	Adeline Tchana	246	6.2	
Green	S J Hannahs	245	6.1	
Independent	Joanne Marie Howey	233	5.8	
Liberal Democrats	Christine Thelwell	164	4.1	
Liberal Democrats	Arnold Simpson	152	3.8	
Independent	John Dennis Brigstock	32	0.8	
Majority				
Turnout		4,000	32.6	

=== Blackhalls and Hesledens ===
Blackhalls and Hesledens (1 Seat)
Party	Candidate	Votes	%	±%
Labour	Rob Crute	629	44.5	
Reform	Gary Johnson	621	43.9	
Liberal Democrats	Neil Thompson	114	8.1	
Conservative	Victoria Bartch	49	3.5	
Majority		8		
Turnout		1,415	32.6	

=== Bowburn and Coxhoe ===
Bowburn and Coxhoe (3 Seats)
Party	Candidate	Votes	%	±%
Reform	Kyle Martin Genner	1,613	41.7	
Independent	Gary Hutchinson	1,419	36.7	
Independent	Jan Blakey	1,409	36.4	
Reform	Benjamin Straughair	1,269	32.8	
Reform	Michael Walter Watson	1,242	32.1	
Labour	Viv Anderson	962	24.9	
Labour	Shaun David Gibson	667	17.2	
Labour	Lennox Walter Lauchlan	607	15.7	
Green	Catherine Marie Birchmore	384	9.9	
Liberal Democrats	Kimberley Noble	200	5.2	
Liberal Democrats	George Alexander Chissell	188	4.9	
Liberal Democrats	Alexander Greenaway	180	4.7	
Conservative	Dorothy Luckhurst	162	4.2	
Conservative	Jane McAndrew	145	3.7	
Conservative	Clive Oliver Rowland	120	3.1	
Majority				
Turnout		3,872	31.6	

=== Brandon ===
Brandon (2 Seats)
Party	Candidate	Votes	%	±%
Green	Jonathan Elmer	1,017	33.7	
Green	Priscilla Anne Bowen Elmer	900	29.8	
Independent	Paul Taylor	845	28.0	
Reform	Andrew Fullard	786	26.0	
Reform	Mark Leigh	700	23.2	
Labour	Anne Bonner	503	16.6	
Labour	Nick Rippin	457	15.1	
Independent	Carolyn Jayne Smith	93	3.1	
Conservative	Billy Walker	71	2.3	
Liberal Democrats	Abrial Jerram	62	2.1	
Liberal Democrats	Prem Raghvani	51	1.7	
Majority				
Turnout		3,047	36.2	

=== Castle Eden and Passfield ===
Castle Eden and Passfield (1 Seat)
Party	Candidate	Votes	%	±%
Reform	Scott Woodhouse	804	52.5	
Labour	Mary Agnes Bell	337	22.0	
North East Party	Susan McDonnell	132	8.6	
Independent	Karen Hawley	124	8.1	
Conservative	James Coulson	87	5.7	
Liberal Democrats	David Hodgson	46	3.0	
Majority		467		
Turnout		1,537	34.5	

=== Chester-le-Street North ===
Chester-le-Street North (2 Seats)
Party	Candidate	Votes	%	±%
Reform	Andrew John Husband	1,139	37.3	
Labour	Tracie Jane Smith	1,082	35.5	
Labour	Julie Anne Scurfield	944	30.9	
Independent	Karen Fantarrow-Darby	860	28.2	
Reform	Antony Teasdale	765	25.1	
Green	Derek Morse	230	7.5	
Conservative	David Brown	199	6.5	
Liberal Democrats	Philip Bernard Nathan	160	5.2	
SDP	Tom Chittenden	83	2.7	
Majority				
Turnout		3,056	40.0	

=== Chester-le-Street South ===
Chester-le-Street South (2 Seats)
Party	Candidate	Votes	%	±%
Independent	Paul Stephen Sexton	1,641	50.0	
Independent	Bill Moist	1,453	44.3	
Reform	Geoff Dovaston	908	27.7	
Reform	Adele Taggart	709	21.6	
Labour	Harry Clark	519	15.8	
Labour	Eileen McKnight-Smith	383	11.7	
Conservative	Ellie Sargeant	217	6.6	
Conservative	Sebastian Gradzki	160	4.9	
Green	Alan Ostle	151	4.6	
Liberal Democrats	Andrew Peter Haney	143	4.4	
Majority				
Turnout		3,286	41.5	

=== Chilton ===
Chilton (1 Seat)
Party	Candidate	Votes	%	±%
Reform	Stephen Robert Bowron	523	46.9	
Independent	Sue Reece	235	21.1	
Labour	Angus John Ferguson	135	12.1	
Independent	Julie Cairns	128	11.5	
Conservative	Catherine Anne Hart	65	5.8	
Liberal Democrats	Carole Lattin	28	2.5	
Majority		288		
Turnout		1,118	30.4	

=== Consett North ===
Consett North (1 Seat)
Party	Candidate	Votes	%	±%
Liberal Democrats	Kathryn Rooney*	772	48.5	
Reform	Trevor Douglas Newsom	537	33.7	
Labour	Rob Moran	238	14.9	
Conservative	Will Robinson	46	2.9	
Majority		235		
Turnout		1,601	38.4	

=== Consett South ===
Consett South (1 Seat)
Party	Candidate	Votes	%	±%
Liberal Democrats	Dominic John Haney*	740	54.8	
Reform	Michael McGaun	421	31.2	
Labour	Phillip Marshall	139	10.3	
Conservative	Rachel McEnaeny	44	3.3	
Majority		319		
Turnout		1,350	35.4	
Liberal Democrats hold		Swing		

=== Craghead and South Moor ===
Craghead and South Moor (2 Seats)
Party	Candidate	Votes	%	±%
Reform	John Michael Cook	1,317	59.4	
Reform	Aaron Hillam	1,148	51.8	
Labour	Les Timbey	601	27.1	
Labour	Carole Ann Hampson	599	27.0	
Liberal Democrats	Neil John Bradbury	229	10.3	
Conservative	Ian Davison	122	5.5	
Majority				
Turnout		2,225	27.9	

=== Crook ===
Crook (3 Seats)
Party	Candidate	Votes	%	±%
Reform	Robbie Rodiss	2,102	51.9	
Reform	Paul David Bean	1,849	45.7	
Reform	Adrian Schulman	1,645	40.6	
Independent	Anne Reed	1,327	32.8	
Labour	Mary Elizabeth Hall	711	17.6	
Labour	Michael Edward Beeforth	679	16.8	
Conservative	Mike Currah	610	15.1	
Labour	John Leslie Wilson	569	14.1	
Conservative	Patricia Jopling	484	12.0	
Green	Steven Douglas Bamlett	335	8.3	
Green	Geoffrey William Martin	280	6.9	
Liberal Democrats	Nick Lion	255	6.3	
Majority				
Turnout		4,053	36.6	

=== Dalton and Dawdon ===
Dalton and Dawdon (2 Seats)
Party	Candidate	Votes	%	±%
Reform	George Anderson	945	38.6	
Reform	Jack McGlenen	876	35.8	
Seaham Community Party	Robert Arthur	845	34.5	
Seaham Community Party	Susan Mary Faulkner	690	28.2	
Labour	Kevin Joseph Shaw	619	25.3	
Labour	June Watson	554	22.6	
Conservative	Mark Shanks	64	2.6	
Liberal Democrats	Giuseppe Enrico Bignardi	61	2.5	
Majority				
Turnout		2,469	30.4	
Reform gain from Labour		Swing		
Reform gain from Labour		Swing		

=== Deerness ===
Deerness (2 Seats)
Party	Candidate	Votes	%	±%
Reform	Matthew John Burnard	1,259	39.8	
Reform	Sean Patrick Healy	1,105	34.9	
Labour	Marion Wilson	860	27.2	
Liberal Democrats	Edwin Simpson	806	25.5	
Liberal Democrats	John Simon Burt	741	23.4	
Labour	Jimmy Jamieson	710	22.4	
Green	Sarah Jane Banks	239	7.6	
Green	Liz Wright	176	5.6	
Conservative	Wendy Frances Smith	94	3.0	
Conservative	Michael Drummond Moverley Smith	90	2.8	
Majority				
Turnout		3,172	37.1	
Reform gain from Labour		Swing		
Reform gain from Labour		Swing		

=== Delves Lane ===
Delves Lane (2 Seats)
Party	Candidate	Votes	%	±%
Reform	Kenny Hope	1,272	50.3	
Reform	Jacqueline Teasdale	1,045	41.3	
Labour	Jane Brown	620	24.5	
Labour	Simon Andrew Stewart-Piercy	461	18.2	
Conservative	Angela Sterling	386	15.3	
Conservative	Michelle Walton	379	15.0	
Liberal Democrats	Nazcat Stephen Haney	276	10.9	
Liberal Democrats	David Bowerbank	219	8.7	
Majority				
Turnout		2,537	32.9	

=== Derwent and Pont Valley ===
Derwent and Pont Valley (3 Seats)
Party	Candidate	Votes	%	±%
Reform	Saffron Sims-Brydon	1,913	39.7	
Reform	Gavin Brydon	1,858	38.5	
Reform	Craig Thomas Marshall	1,761	36.5	
Labour	Veronica Andrews	1,272	26.4	
Labour	Declan Gerard John Mulholland	1,267	26.3	
Labour	Tom Hubbuck	1,059	22.0	
Derwentside Independents	Watts Stelling	1,027	21.3	
Derwentside Independents	Alan Shield	1,014	21.0	
Derwentside Independents	Eileen Elliott	766	15.9	
Green	Richard Edwin Simpson	384	8.0	
Liberal Democrats	Tonia Jean Atkinson	289	6.0	
Conservative	Jacob Boneham	276	5.7	
Liberal Democrats	Stephen Murray	208	4.3	
Majority				
Turnout		4,826	37.5	

=== Easington and Shotton ===
Easington and Shotton (3 Seats)
Party	Candidate	Votes	%	±%
Reform	John Bailey	1,849	52.0	
Reform	Howard William Brown	1,752	49.3	
Reform	Louise Taylor	1,729	48.6	
Independent	Sophie Louise Brown	798	22.5	
Independent	Christopher Ross Hood	743	20.9	
Labour	Angela Surtees	713	20.1	
Labour	Leeann Clarkson	601	16.9	
Labour	Omide Deinali	527	14.8	
Independent	Ivan Cochrane	479	13.5	
Conservative	Tom Baker	163	4.6	
Independent	Rob Moore	158	4.4	
Liberal Democrats	Chukwuka Okuchukwu	156	4.4	
Conservative	Kye Slawson-Powell	104	2.9	
Majority				
Turnout		3,560	29.8	

=== Elvet, Gilesgate and Shincliffe ===
Elvet, Gilesgate and Shincliffe (2 Seats)
Party	Candidate	Votes	%	±%
Liberal Democrats	David Robert Freeman*	936	39.4	
Liberal Democrats	Ellie Jayne Hopgood	839	35.4	
Labour	Rory Handy	660	27.8	
Labour	Stacey Deinali	613	25.8	
Reform	Xavier Hale	403	17.0	
Reform	Isaac Lucan	381	16.1	
Green	Stephen James Ashfield	356	15.0	
Green	Jamie Michael Pearson	215	9.1	
Conservative	George Carter	114	4.8	
Conservative	Graham William Lee	81	3.4	
Majority				
Turnout		2,382	29.0	

=== Evenwood ===
Evenwood (1 Seat)
Party	Candidate	Votes	%	±%
Reform	Robert Potts	732	48.7	
Labour	Becky Land	352	23.4	
Conservative	James Cosslett	275	18.3	
Green	Michael Stonehouse	76	5.1	
Liberal Democrats	Anne Woodward	69	4.6	
Majority		380		
Turnout		1,511	39.4	

=== Ferryhill ===
Ferryhill (2 Seats)
Party	Candidate	Votes	%	±%
Reform	Paul Mountford	1,114	40.4	
Reform	Joe Michael Quinn	986	35.8	
Independent	Glenys Joan Newby	934	33.9	
Labour	Curtis Ferenc Bihari	857	31.1	
Labour	Carole Atkinson	629	22.8	
Conservative	David Farry	174	6.3	
Green	Matthew Henry Choi	107	3.9	
Conservative	Lisa Coxon	102	3.7	
Liberal Democrats	Sandra Elizabeth Kirby	84	3.0	
Liberal Democrats	Bob Peach	57	2.1	
UKIP	John Barry Lathan	33	1.2	
Majority				
Turnout		2,766	35.5	

=== Framwellgate and Newton Hall ===
Framwellgate and Newton Hall (3 Seats)
Party	Candidate	Votes	%	±%
Liberal Democrats	Amanda Hopgood	2,465	53.0	
Liberal Democrats	Mark Wilkes	2,425	52.2	
Liberal Democrats	Elizabeth Pears	2,048	44.0	
Reform	Neville Forbes	1,173	25.2	
Reform	Colin Trevor Toghill	983	21.1	
Labour	Kaye Burns	830	17.8	
Labour	Rachael Perry	768	16.5	
Labour	Valerie Speed	689	14.8	
Green	Irene Ostle	432	9.3	
Independent	Karon Willis	306	6.6	
Conservative	Carolyn Anne Baker	243	5.2	
Conservative	Elizabeth Anne Marshall	195	4.2	
Conservative	Matthew James Smith	191		
Majority				
Turnout		4,656	42.9	

=== Horden and Dene House ===
Horden and Dene House (2 Seats)
Party	Candidate	Votes	%	±%
Reform	Dawn Bellingham	1,312	54.8	
Reform	John Cottier	1,147	47.9	
Labour	Chris Cain	725	30.3	
Labour	June Clark	703	29.4	
Independent	Paul Maddison	165	6.9	
Independent	Arlene Helen Childs	100	4.2	
Liberal Democrats	Owen Temple	85	3.6	
Independent	Matthew Thomas Tough	67	2.8	
Conservative	Nigel Jeremy Cassidy	57	2.4	
Majority				
Turnout		2,415	30.3	

=== Lanchester and Burnhope ===
Lanchester and Burnhope (1 Seat)
Party	Candidate	Votes	%	±%
Labour	Alison Louise Gray	755	35.8	
Conservative	Doug Oliver	710	33.7	
Reform	Stephen Harrison	563	26.7	
Liberal Democrats	Jeanette Williams	79	3.7	
Majority		45		
Turnout		2,114	47.4	

=== Langley and Esh ===
Langley and Esh (1 Seat)
Party	Candidate	Votes	%	±%
Liberal Democrats	Alex Neil	777	48.0	
Reform	Andrea Mary Brown	534	33.0	
Labour	Michael Toner	187	11.5	
Green	Joshua James Lightfoot	68	4.2	
Conservative	Mark Paul Shaw	54	3.3	
Majority		243		
Turnout		1,620	37.4	

=== Lower Teesdale ===
Lower Teesdale (2 Seats)
Party	Candidate	Votes	%	±%
Reform	Jillian Anne Campbell	1,075	37.4	
Reform	Jasmine Fox	1,008	35.1	
Green	Sarah Louise Hannan	726	25.3	
Conservative	George Morland Richardson	666	23.2	
Conservative	James Rowlandson	636	22.1	
Green	Marc Cole	555	19.3	
Labour	Simon Lind	434	15.1	
Labour	Noah Padraig McCourt	302	10.5	
Liberal Democrats	Wico van Mourik	116	4.0	
Majority				
Turnout		2,878	42.4	

=== Lumley and West Rainton ===
Lumley and West Rainton (2 Seats)
Party	Candidate	Votes	%	±%
Independent	Alan Bell	1,581	54.2	
Independent	Philip Heaviside	1,353	46.4	
Reform	Adam Carter-Jones	844	29.0	
Reform	Ewan Charles Marshall	719	24.7	
Labour	Paul Greenwood	325	11.1	
Labour	Lyn Leach	301	10.3	
Liberal Democrats	David Alan Haswell	152	5.2	
Conservative	Thomas Shanks	140	4.8	
Green	Bisserka Ivanova Gaydarska	115	3.9	
Majority				
Turnout		2,919	38.0	

=== Murton ===
Murton (2 Seats)
Party	Candidate	Votes	%	±%
Reform	David Cumming	1,045	45.1	
Reform	Mark Stephen Rowney	938	40.5	
Labour	Julie Ann Griffiths	781	33.7	
Labour	Robert Adcock-Forster	682	29.5	
Independent	Brian Brown	322	13.9	
Independent	Stephen George Robson	312	13.5	
Conservative	Brian Wareham	121	5.2	
Liberal Democrats	Antonio Milian	99	4.3	
Majority				
Turnout		2,323	29.1	

=== Nevilles Cross ===
Nevilles Cross (2 Seats)
Party	Candidate	Votes	%	±%
Liberal Democrats	Liz Brown	1,402	52.9	+0.5
Liberal Democrats	Elizabeth Scott	1,266	47.8	+3.6
Labour	Les Wilson	545	20.6	−6.4
Labour	Gabriel Ridley	529	20.0	−1.6
Green	Jack Hughes	476	18.0	−3.5
Reform	Gary Black	382	14.4	N/A
Reform	Katrina Rockett	314	11.9	N/A
Conservative	Deborah Jane Whitfield	172	6.5	−7.2
Majority				
Turnout		2,659	31.3	
Liberal Democrats hold		Swing		
Liberal Democrats hold		Swing		

=== North Lodge ===
North Lodge (1 Seat)
Party	Candidate	Votes	%	±%
Liberal Democrats	Craig Martin	999	58.0	
Reform	Darren Hawkes	432	25.1	
Labour	Glenn James Batey	212	12.3	
Conservative	Krishnarajasri Krishnapillai	37	2.1	
Green	Chris Dale	36	2.1	
Majority		567		
Turnout		1,721	44.4	

=== Pelton ===
Pelton (3 Seats)
Party	Candidate	Votes	%	±%
Reform	Steve Biggs	1,767	47.5	
Reform	Ian Mark Cross	1,748	47.0	
Reform	Brian Quirey	1,630	43.8	
Labour	Alison Joan Batey	1,428	38.4	
Labour	Danny Wood	1,300	34.9	
Labour	Paul Pringle	1,221	32.8	
Green	Andrew Gray	263	7.1	
Conservative	Darren Whitfield	255	6.9	
Liberal Democrats	Alan Neil	245	6.6	
Liberal Democrats	Adam Joseph Walker	215	5.8	
Liberal Democrats	Nigel van Zwanenberg	180	4.8	
Majority				
Turnout		3,729	31.1	

=== Peterlee ===
Peterlee (2 Seats)
Party	Candidate	Votes	%	±%
Reform	Steven Franklin	1,063	52.1	
Reform	Dawn Saunders	900	44.1	
Labour	Louise Fenwick	425	20.8	
Labour	Audrey Ellen Laing	384	18.8	
North East Party	Mary Alison Cartwright	326	16.0	
Independent	Ray Burnip	173	8.5	
Independent	Diane Howarth	172	8.4	
North East Party	Al Wilkinson	86	4.2	
Conservative	Michael Cassidy	82	4.0	
Independent	David Hawley	77	3.8	
Liberal Democrats	Heather Leake	57	2.8	
Majority				
Turnout		2,054	24.2	

=== Pittington and Sherburn ===
Pittington and Sherburn (1 Seat)
Party	Candidate	Votes	%	±%
Reform	Rhys Burriss	508	35.6	
Liberal Democrats	Stephen Charles White	443	31.0	
Labour	Bill Kellett	356	24.9	
Conservative	Malcolm Colledge	63	4.4	
Green	Maggie Tallerman	54	3.8	
Majority		65		
Turnout		1,428	38.5	
Reform gain from Labour		Swing		

=== Sacriston and Witton Gilbert ===
Sacriston and Witton Gilbert (2 Seats)
Party	Candidate	Votes	%	±%
Reform	James Pickard	1,088	42.4	
Reform	Timothy John Robson	1,023	39.9	
Liberal Democrats	Hugh Massey	807	31.5	
Liberal Democrats	Andy Przybysz	709	27.7	
Labour	Emma Waldock	553	21.6	
Labour	Andrew Eric Page	500	19.5	
Green	Nicholas Leight Kasch	177	6.9	
Majority				
Turnout		2,569	32.7	

=== Seaham ===
Seaham (2 Seats)
Party	Candidate	Votes	%	±%
Reform	Andrew Harrison	1,219	40.9	
Reform	Christopher Fairs	1,145	38.4	
Seaham Community Party	Barry Taylor	777	26.0	
Labour	Rochelle Laine	747	25.0	
Labour	John James Purvis	691	23.2	
Seaham Community Party	Stephen Wayman	656	22.0	
Green	Stephen Jonathan Joseph	151	5.1	
Conservative	Ian Leslie McAndrew	150	5.0	
Conservative	Tolu Kolawole	116	3.9	
Liberal Democrats	Rafe J Richards	87	2.9	
Majority				
Turnout		3,006	34.3	

=== Sedgefield ===
Sedgefield (2 Seats)
Party	Candidate	Votes	%	±%
Independent	Chris Lines	1,372	44.1	
Reform	Ian Catchpole	1,115	35.9	
Reform	Christine Moore	926	29.8	
Conservative	Elaine Peeke	624	20.1	
Labour	Lucy Ann Gibson	529	17.0	
Labour	Kester Noble	501	16.1	
Green	Rebecca Margaret Dixon	229	7.4	
Liberal Democrats	Charlotte Ann Shaw	120	3.9	
Green	Richard Wilkes	111	3.6	
Liberal Democrats	Philip Hugh Layton	102	3.3	
Majority				
Turnout		3,115	39.4	

=== Shildon and Dene Valley ===
Shildon and Dene Valley (3 Seats)
Party	Candidate	Votes	%	±%
Reform	Michael David Ramage	2,220	56.8	
Reform	Kate Rowland	2,181	55.8	
Reform	James Michael Stephenson	2,034	52.0	
Labour	Shirley Quinn	849	21.7	
Labour	Samantha Townsend	805	20.6	
Labour	Charlie Kay	768	19.6	
Independent	Fred Langley	625	16.0	
Liberal Democrats	Leanne Barrett	389	9.9	
Liberal Democrats	Michael Shaw	336	8.6	
Conservative	Jack Charlton	282	7.2	
Conservative	Clive Michael Parker	221	5.7	
Majority				
Turnout		3,920	32.3	

=== Spennymoor ===
Spennymoor (2 Seats)
Party	Candidate	Votes	%	±%
Independent	Liz Maddison	1,162	37.5	
Independent	Pete Molloy	1,006	32.5	
Reform	Ernest Spowart	977	31.5	
Reform	William Sydney Thorkildsen	824	26.6	
Liberal Democrats	Dean Ranyard	544	17.6	
Liberal Democrats	Liss Owen	466	15.0	
Labour	Stephen Francis Gilling	444	14.3	
Labour	Jabez Jordon Sherrington	324	10.5	
Conservative	David Barry Evans	97	3.1	
Conservative	Christopher Anthony Coxon	70	2.3	
Majority				
Turnout		3,118	34.5	
Independent hold		Swing		
Independent hold		Swing		

=== Stanley ===
Stanley (2 Seats)
Party	Candidate	Votes	%	±%
Reform	Christine Blatchford	1,366	54.5	
Reform	David Stanley Walton	1,336	53.3	
Labour	James Kane	640	25.5	
Labour	Carl Marshall	601	24.0	
Independent	Paddy McGough	270	10.8	
Liberal Democrats	David Agutter Rolfe	154	6.1	
Conservative	Charles Aldous	117	4.7	
Independent	Frankie Elise Ward	78	3.1	
Majority				
Turnout		2,528	30.9	

=== Thornley and Wheatley Hill ===
Thornley and Wheatley Hill (1 Seat)
Party	Candidate	Votes	%	±%
Reform	Neil Craggs	921	65.1	
Labour	Jake Miller	375	26.5	
Liberal Democrats	Pamela Ann Askell	65	4.6	
Conservative	Graham Southall	53	3.7	
Majority		546		
Turnout		1,418	32.5	

=== Trimdon and Wingate ===
Trimdon and Wingate (2 Seats)
Party	Candidate	Votes	%	±%
Reform	Mary-Lynn Franklin	1,361	49.7	
Reform	Susan Husband	1,171	42.7	
Labour	Lucy Hovvels	797	29.1	
Labour	Paul Trippett	660	24.1	
North East Party	Sean Ward Ivey	514	18.8	
Liberal Democrats	Liz Temple	186	6.8	
Conservative	Rathika Krishnarajasri	120	4.4	
Majority				
Turnout		2,749	31.4	

=== Tudhoe ===
Tudhoe (2 Seats)
Party	Candidate	Votes	%	±%
Independent	Billy McAloon	996	40.6	
Reform	Nicola Lyons	826	33.7	
Reform	Dave Whalley	747	30.5	
Independent	Andy Anderson	697	28.4	
Labour	Ian Geldard	479	19.5	
Labour	Neil Crowther Foster	412	16.8	
Liberal Democrats	Beckie Ranyard	168	6.9	
Liberal Democrats	Martin Thomas Brian Jones	101	4.1	
Conservative	Oliver Garbutt Peeke	98	4.0	
Conservative	Michael Francis Renton	73	3.0	
Majority				
Turnout		2,474	31.2	

=== Upper Teesdale ===
Upper Teesdale (1 Seat)
Party	Candidate	Votes	%	±%
Conservative	Richard Andrew Bell	808	45.5	
Reform	Ian Hirst	522	29.4	
Labour	Chris Kelsey	253	14.3	
Green	Kathleen McGough	103	5.8	
Liberal Democrats	Florence Diana Simpson	84	4.7	
Majority		286		
Turnout		1,775	48.1	

=== Weardale ===
Weardale (2 Seats)
Party	Candidate	Votes	%	±%
Independent	Anita Savory	1,331	36.8	
Independent	John Shuttleworth	1,215	33.6	
Reform	Paul Beattie	1,037	28.6	
Reform	David Brown	1,031	28.5	
Conservative	Will Wearmouth	762	21.0	
Conservative	Richard Lawrie	490	13.5	
Green	Matthew James Ferguson	267	7.4	
Labour	Gemma Louise Holmes-Wood	250	6.9	
Labour	Sally-Beth Marshall	233	6.4	
Liberal Democrats	Olivia Evelyn Dunn	135	3.7	
Majority				
Turnout		3,631	47.5	

=== West Auckland ===
West Auckland (2 Seats)
Party	Candidate	Votes	%	±%
Reform	Nick Brown	1,453	52.0	
Reform	Stephen Gray	1,287	46.1	
Labour	Robert John Yorke	906	32.4	
Labour	George Smith	874	31.3	
Conservative	Georgia Lynne Holmes	230	8.2	
Independent	Lesley Gwyneth Zair	131	4.7	
Green	Liz Tyrrell	118	4.2	
Independent	Alan John Breeze	104	3.7	
Liberal Democrats	Alyson Hudson	89	3.2	
Liberal Democrats	Alison Clare Fidgin	78	2.8	
Majority				
Turnout		2,796	34.2	

=== Willington and Hunwick ===
Willington and Hunwick (2 Seats)
Party	Candidate	Votes	%	±%
Reform	Cathy Hunt	1,336	49.0	
Reform	Emma Hunt	1,281	47.0	
Labour	Olwyn Elizabeth Gunn	763	28.0	
Labour	Trevor Tinsley	610	22.4	
Conservative	Sam Mitchell-Worthington	249	9.1	
Independent	Angela Smith	241	8.8	
Conservative	Aiden Smith	225	8.2	
Green	David Ata Saygi	180	6.6	
Liberal Democrats	Geoff Moore	174	6.4	
Liberal Democrats	Aaron Calder	134	4.9	
Majority				
Turnout		2,733	38.0	

== Changes 2025–2029 ==
- Just nine days after the election, Reform UK councillor Andrew Kilburn, who was elected in Benfieldside, resigned after it emerged he did not inform the party that he had previously worked for the council, the resulting by-election was won by the Liberal Democrats.
- On the 14th of May 2025, independent councillor for Chester-le-Street, Paul Sexton, defected to Reform UK.
- The leader of the Reform UK group on the council prior to the election had been Robert Potts. Following the election, Reform UK chose Andrew Husband to be their new group leader. He was formally appointed as the new leader of the council at the subsequent annual council meeting on 21 May 2025.
- On the 9th of June 2025, Reform UK Councillor for Easington and Shotton, John Bailey, announced his resignation due to ill health, the resulting by-election resulted in a Reform UK hold
- On the 19th of August 2025, Reform UK Councillor for Crook, Paul Bean was suspended by the party over reported comments he had made about asylum seekers, breaching Civil Service impartiality rules, due to his job assessing asylum seeker's claims. On the 16th of January 2026 it was announced that he had joined Advance UK.
- In September 2025, Jack McGlenen, a councillor for Dalton and Dawdon, was expelled from Reform UK following a disciplinary process over allegations of public intoxication, offensive behaviour towards hospitality workers and derogatory comments about the party at an Armed Forces Day event in Seaham on 28 June 2025; he continued to sit as an independent.
- On the 8th of January 2026, it was reported that David Cumming, councillor for Murton, resigned due to gaining employment abroad, triggering a by-election in his ward.
- On the 10th of February 2026 Michael Ramage, a councillor for Shildon and Dene Valley became an independent. This followed not having attended 4 Council Meetings.
- On 13 February 2026, West Auckland councillor Nick Brown resigned from Reform UK, citing bullying by the party's local leadership and a failure to deliver on its election promises, including the cancellation of the long-promised Toft Hill Bypass; he continued to sit as an independent.
- In April 2026, Dawn Saunders, a councillor for Peterlee, left Reform UK to sit as an ungrouped independent, before returning to the party within weeks.
- In May 2026, Kate Rowland, a Reform UK councillor for Shildon and Dene Valley, resigned from the party to sit as an independent.
- On 11 May 2026, Reform UK councillors Andrew Harrison (Seaham) and Kenny Hope (Delves Lane) were suspended from the party pending investigation; Harrison's suspension followed a £40,000 fine received by his company for employing an illegal worker. Both men resigned from the party on 15 May 2026 to sit as independents, citing a breakdown in their relationship with the local Reform leadership.
- In June 2026, Jasmine Fox, a councillor for Lower Teesdale, left Reform UK to sit as an independent, saying serving as an independent was "the best way for me to represent the residents who elected me."
- On 20 August 2026, Sedgefield councillor Ian Catchpole resigned from Reform UK to sit as an independent, accusing the party's local leadership of "blatant disregard" for mental health; a Reform spokesperson said the resignation came amid an internal review into the unauthorised disclosure of private group material, with the whip having already been removed pending its outcome.
- It was reported on 31 August 2026 that Jack McGlenen, who had been sitting as an independent since his expulsion from Reform UK, had joined the Social Democratic Party.
- On 16 September 2026, three Reform UK councillors — Lyndsey Fox (Bishop Auckland), Nicole Brown (Aycliffe South) and Paul Sexton (Chester-le-Street), who had defected to Reform in May 2025 — resigned from the party to sit as independents. Fox said she had reported a "very serious safeguarding issue" to the party on 14 July 2026 and had "heard nothing" since; council leader Andrew Husband said the three had "conned" voters and "betrayed" the party and its supporters.

As a result of these by-election losses, defections and resignations, by 17 September 2026 Reform UK's representation on the council had fallen from 65 to 51 seats, while the Labour Party and Liberal Democrats had each gained a seat through the Murton and Benfieldside by-elections respectively (rising to 5 and 15 seats), independents had risen to 22, and the Advance UK and Social Democratic Party groups had each gained their first seat on the council; Conservative and Green Party representation remained unchanged at one and two seats respectively.

=== Benfieldside by-election ===
Benfieldside by-election: 3 July 2025
Party	Candidate	Votes	%	±%
Liberal Democrats	Terry Rooney	824	28.3	+17.3
Labour	Kevin Earley	800	27.4	+0.8
Reform	Stephen Harrison	747	25.6	−6.6
Independent	Stephen Robinson	459	15.7	−8.0
Conservative	David Lowes	76	1.6	−5.0
Green	Richard Simpson	40	1.4	N/A
Majority		24	0.9	N/A
Turnout		2,953	37.4	−2.2
Registered electors		7,981		
Liberal Democrats gain from Reform		Swing	▲8.3	

The Benfieldside by-election was triggered by the resignation of Reform UK councillor Andrew Kilburn, who was required to stand down nine days after his election after failing to declare to the returning officer that he was employed by the council; national legislation bars council employees from serving as councillors at the same time.

=== Easington & Shotton by-election ===
Easington & Shotton by-election: 7 August 2025
Party	Candidate	Votes	%	±%
Reform	Louise Penders	1,208	46.7	+1.6
Labour	Angela Surtees	523	20.2	+2.8
Independent	Christopher Hood	520	20.1	+2.0
Independent	Ivan Cochrane	179	6.9	–4.8
Green	Stephen Ashfield	60	2.3	N/A
Conservative	Anthony Stubbs	47	1.8	–2.2
Liberal Democrats	Chukwuka Okuchukwu	27	1.0	–2.8
Independent	Arlene Childs	23	0.9	N/A
Majority		685	26.5	N/A
Turnout		2,589	21.7	–8.1
Registered electors		11,942		
Reform hold		Swing	▼0.6	

The Easington & Shotton by-election was triggered by the resignation of Reform UK councillor John Bailey, who stood down due to ill health.

=== Murton by-election ===
Murton by-election: 5 March 2026
Party	Candidate	Votes	%	±%
Labour	Julie Griffiths	1,004	50.6	▲16.9
Reform	Theo Bell	786	39.6	▼5.5
Green	Isaac Short	95	4.8	N/A
Conservative	Dorothy Luckhurst	61	3.1	▼2.1
Liberal Democrats	Neil Thompson	38	1.9	▼2.4
Majority		218	11.0	N/A
Turnout		1,991	24.9	▼4.2
Labour gain from Reform		Swing	▲11.2	

The by-election was triggered by the resignation of Reform councillor David Cumming, who stood down after gaining employment abroad.

=== Craghead & South Moor by-election ===
Craghead & South Moor by-election: 19 November 2026
Party	Candidate	Votes	%	±%
Reform	Mark Taylor	820	42.8	−15.3
Labour	Les Timbey	728	38.0	+11.5
Restore	Jean Thompson	153	8.0	N/A
Liberal Democrats	Victoria Aymard	93	4.9	−5.2
Green	Calum Hutchinson	70	3.7	N/A
Conservative	Dorothy Luckhurst	53	2.8	−2.6
Majority		92	4.8	N/A
Turnout		1924	24.8	−3.1
Reform hold		Swing		

== See also ==
- Durham County Council elections
