= Great Lumley =

Village in County Durham, England

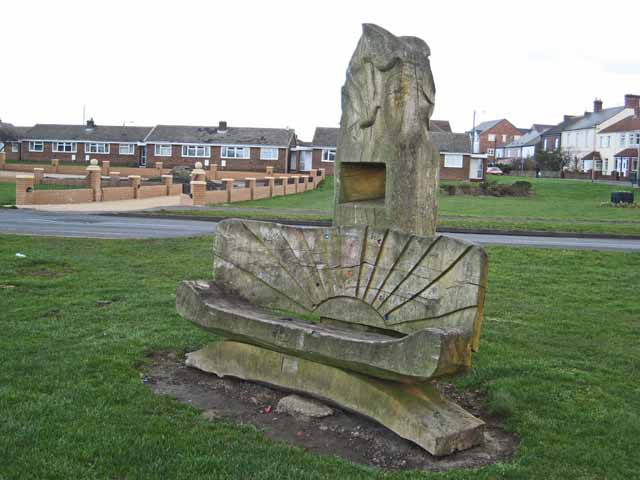
- Back Lane, Great Lumley with a wooden carved bench

- Location within County Durham
- Population: 3,630 (2021)
- OS grid reference: NZ295492
- Civil parish: Great Lumley
- Unitary authority: County Durham
- Ceremonial county: County Durham
- Region: North East
- Country: England
- Sovereign state: United Kingdom
- Post town: Chester le Street
- Postcode district: DH3
- Dialling code: 0191
- Police: Durham
- Fire: County Durham and Darlington
- Ambulance: North East

Great Lumley is a village in County Durham, England. It is situated south east of Chester-le-Street, near Lumley Castle. It has a population of 3,630 as of the 2021 census.

== The Lumley family, East and West Halls ==
The village of Great Lumley was formerly part of the Lumley family estate.

The Lumley family are descended from Ligulf of Lumley, an Anglo-Saxon noble who fled from the Normans in the south of England and found shelter in the dominions of Saint Cuthbert. He married Ealdgyth (or Algitha), granddaughter of Uhtred the Bold, Earl of Northumbria. One of Uhtred's wives was Ælfgifu, the youngest daughter of King Æthelred the Unready.

The long-ruined East Hall was the seat of the Lumley family before Lumley Castle was built, and is the supposed location of the murder of Ligulf by Bishop Walcher's officers after Ligulf complained to the bishop of their cruelty. The Northumbrians, maddened by the loss of their protector soon murdered Bishop Walcher at Gateshead.

In the reign of Henry III, the estate passed to the descendants of three daughters. Margaret Lumley (wife of Christopher Moresby) died leaving her lands (East and West Hall ruins plus 100 acres (0.40 km^{2}) of tillage land, 30 acres (120,000 m^{2}) of wood, 30 acres of moor, fishery at the Wear) to her infant son Christopher Moresby. However, it is probable that the land reverted to the Lumley family following Christopher's death. In later generations, Thomas Lumley's daughter, Elizabeth, married William Tyllyoll and after William's death, the lands passed to Phillis Musgrave and Margaret Tyllyoll. In the reign of Queen Elizabeth I, Thomas Knevitt and the Musgraves parceled out the land to their tenants as freehold estates.

== Lumley Hospital ==
Sir John Duck founded Lumley Hospital on September 29, 1686 for twelve people aged 60 and over. John Pots and eleven widows were incorporated as "The Brethren and Sisters of the Hospital".

== Becoming part of the Lambton Estate ==
Sir John Duck died in 1691, leaving his estates to his wife. She in turn left them to their nephew, James Nicholson of Rainton. James died in 1727, leaving all his estates to his three daughters. One of the daughters, Mary Nicholson, never married, and left her portion to her nephew, John Lyon, who by 1759 became the ninth Earl of Strathmore. Susan Lyon, John's sister, married John Lambton in 1763. Major General John Lambton was the Member of Parliament for Durham City from 1762 to 1787. He subsequently purchased the Lumley estate.

== Mining and quarrying ==
Great Lumley is built upon the Durham coal field with several workable seams underneath it. Stobbs Hill pit was opened in 1704 to the shallowest coal at 26 fathoms (156 ft; 48 m).

No 1 and No 2 pits started to be sunk in 1776 and by the 1790s the colliery was in production. (Note: A colliery is a coal mine which is accessed by a number of pits which are the shafts down to it.) The colliery used a number of pits over its life, Nos 1-9 were simply numbered, in addition there were the George, Stobbs Hill and West pits. Seven different seams were worked over the years ranging from around 100 feet (30 m) to nearly 850 feet (260 m).

The pit appears to have been gassy and in the days before safety lamps were introduced there were a number of fatal explosions. Sixty lives were recorded as having been lost in 1727, a further 31 lost in an explosion on 11 April 1797. On 11 October 1799 a "violent explosion took place in Lumley colliery ... by which ... thirty-nine human beings were launched into eternity". The following century saw more explosions. On 9 October 1819 there was an explosion in George pit. It is thought that a fall of the roof released firedamp which was ignited by a candle. Eleven men were killed instantly, two more (including the hewer (Note: A man who "hews" or cuts the coal from the working face.) whose candle caused the blast) died the following day of their injuries. In 1824 another explosion killed 14 people and on 20 July 1827 a man went into the wrong area with a candle and triggered an explosion. Nine men were burnt, one of whom subsequently died.

In the 19th century, with the nearby coal mines flourishing, the village grew from 696 people in 1801 to 2,301 people by 1831. As mining started to decline, so did the population, reduced to 1,730 people by 1851. In 1834 there were 411 houses, 8 public houses, two schools, and two chapels (one Old Methodist and one New Methodist).

Between Great Lumley and what was then called Little Lumley was a clay quarry (54°50′47″N 1°31′19″W, grid reference NZ307503), just south of the site of Lumley Brickworks.

== Lumley today ==
The village now contains one public house, the Old England, and one snooker club and sports bar, The Snooks. Three churches are also situated in the village, along with three small supermarkets and several small independent stores. There is the Community Centre placed in the middle of the village. The Centre boasts a "Community Cafe" open for tea and coffee as well as snacks and daily specials.

== Governance ==
The village is the most populous area of the electoral ward of Lumley. This ward also includes Bournmoor parish with a total population taken at the 2011 census of 7,537.
