= Amanda Hopgood =

British politician

Councillor Amanda Hopgood

Leader of Durham County Council
- In office 26 May 2021 – 15 May 2025
- Preceded by: Simon Henig
- Succeeded by: Andrew Husband

Leader of the Opposition in Durham County Council
- Incumbent
- Assumed office 15 May 2025
- Preceded by: Carl Marshall

Councillor for Framwellgate and Newton Hall
- Incumbent
- Assumed office 1 May 2008

Leader of the Liberal Democrats on Durham County Council
- Incumbent
- Assumed office 26 May 2021

Personal details
- Born: June 1970 (age 56)
- Party: Liberal Democrats

Amanda Jayne Hopgood (born June 1970) is a British Liberal Democrat politician who has served as the Leader of the Opposition of Durham County Council since 2025, having previously served as leader of Durham County Council from 2021 to 2025. She has been the leader of the Liberal Democrats on the council since 2021. She has served as a councillor for Framwellgate and Newton Hall ward since 2008.

== Political career ==
Hopgood became leader of Durham County Council in 2021 following the 2021 Durham County Council election, leading a coalition government involving members of the Liberal Democrats, Conservatives, Greens, independents, and minor parties. She replaced Simon Henig as leader of the council. It marked the first time since 1925 that a non-Labour Party politician led the council.

Hopgood led the Liberal Democrat group in the 2025 local elections which saw Reform UK emerge as the largest party, with the Liberal Democrats coming second. She urged Reform to 'deliver on their promises' following the election. She was succeeded by Andrew Husband from Reform UK.
