= Chester-le-Street (district) =

Former local government district in County Durham, England

Coordinates: 54.860°N 1.574°W

Chester-le-Street District
- Shown within ceremonial County Durham
- Area
  - 1974: 16,243 acres (65.73 km^{2})
- Population
  - 1973: 48,730
  - 1992: 52,900
  - 2001: 53,692
- History
  - Origin: Chester-le-Street urban and rural districts
  - Created: 1974
  - Abolished: 2009
  - Succeeded by: County Durham
- Status: District
- ONS code: 20UB
- Government: Chester-le-Street District Council
  - HQ: Chester-le-Street

Chester-le-Street was a local government district in County Durham, England. Its council was based in Chester-le-Street. Other places in the district included Great Lumley and Sacriston.

== Formation ==
The district was formed on 1 April 1974 as part of a general reorganisation of local administration throughout England and Wales carried out under the Local Government Act 1972. Chester-le-Street was one of eight non-metropolitan districts into which County Durham was divided, and was formed from the areas of the abolished urban district of Chester-le-Street along with the bulk of Chester-le-Street Rural District, namely the parishes of Bournmoor, Birtley (reduced in size), Edmondsley, Great Lumley, Lambton, Little Lumley, North Lodge (created from the part of Harraton outside Washington New Town), Ouston, Pelton, Plawsworth, Sacriston, South Biddick (reduced in size), Urpeth and Waldridge. The remainder of the rural district was transferred to the metropolitan boroughs of Gateshead and Sunderland, in the new county of Tyne and Wear.

== Insignia ==
The district council did not have a coat of arms, but instead used the design of the chairman's badge of office as its logo. the design consisted of a circle divided by a curved cross into four quarters.

- In the centre of the cross was a lion, taken from the arms of the Lambton family of Lambton Castle.
- In the top left quarter was a cross of Saint Cuthbert. The saint's remains lay in Chester for more than a century, and the town was the see of a bishop. The saint's relics and the bishopric were subsequently transferred to Durham. The River Wear formed the background.
- In the top right quarter was a depiction of the pithead gear of a coal mine, illustrating the area's traditional source of wealth. Behind this was shown the Chester-le-Street Viaduct
- In the bottom left quarter was a falcon, with Lumley Castle in the background.
- In the bottom right quarter was a depiction of the legendary Lambton Worm.

The emblems in the upper left and lower left quarters were subsequently altered to a bishop's mitre and a Roman eagle standard.

== Abolition ==
The district was abolished as part of the 2009 structural changes to local government in England being replaced by a new unitary authority called Durham County Council.

== Electoral divisions ==
- Chester-le-Street North and East Chester East ward; Chester North ward
- Chester-le-Street South Chester South ward; Edmondsley and Waldridge ward
- Chester-le-Street West Central Chester Central ward; Chester West ward; Pelton Fell ward
- Lumley Bournmoor ward; Lumley ward
- Ouston and Urpeth Grange Villa and West Pelton ward; Ouston ward; Urpeth ward
- Pelton North Lodge ward; Pelton ward
- Sacriston Kimblesworth and Plawsworth ward; Sacriston ward

== Villages in Chester-le-Street district ==
- Beamish
- Great Lumley
- Pelton
- Pelton Fell
- Perkinsville
- Picktree
- Sacriston
- Ouston
