= Derwentside =

Former local government area in Co.Durham, England

Coordinates: 54.867°N 1.760°W

- Shown within County Durham
- Area
  - 1974: 66,944 acres (270.91 km^{2})
- Population
  - 1973: 91,460
  - 1992: 87,200
  - 2001: 85,074
- History
  - Created: 1974
  - Abolished: 2009
  - Succeeded by: County Durham
- Status: District
- ONS code: 20UD
- Government: Durham County Council
  - HQ: Consett
  - Motto: Donec Defluet Amnis (Until the river ceases to flow)

Derwentside was, from 1974 to 2009, a local government district in County Durham, England.

The district took its name from the River Derwent, which made up part of the northern border of the district. Its main towns were Consett and Stanley, with the district council offices on Consett's Medomsley Road. The rest of the district was semi-rural, with numerous former pit villages running into one another.

== Formation ==
The district was formed on 1 April 1974 under the Local Government Act 1972, which reorganised local administration throughout England and Wales. The district was a merger of three abolished districts:

- Consett Urban District
- Stanley Urban District
- Lanchester Rural District

Derwentside was one of eight districts into which County Durham was divided in 1974. It was bounded on the east by Chester-le-Street District, to the south-east by the City of Durham and to the south and west by Wear Valley District. To the north the district was bounded by the Metropolitan County of Tyne and Wear and to the north west by Northumberland.

== Economy ==
Derwentside's economy was traditionally based on the steel industry and coal mining. With the loss of these industries, the district struggled with unemployment, although European Union funding provided a boost to local businesses and visitor attractions.

== Elections and political control ==
The first election to Derwentside District Council took place on 7 June 1973, with the 55 councillors elected forming a shadow authority until 1 April 1974. Elections of the whole council were next held in 1976, and every four years thereafter. Throughout the council's existence it was controlled by the Labour Party, initially with very large majorities. The main opposition group were the Derwentside Independents. At the final election prior to abolition, held in 2007, Labour's majority was reduced to only three seats.

Year	Conservative	Labour	Liberal/ Liberal Democrat	Independent	Other
1973	1	45	3	3	3
1976	2 (+1)	39 (−6)	5 (+2)	9 (+3)	0
1979	6	31	3	15	0
1983	4 (−2)	36 (+3)	2	12 (−1)	SDP 1
1987	3 (−1)	43 (+5)	0 (−1)	9 (−2)	SDP 0 (−1)
1991	2	39	0	14	0
1995	0 (−2)	50 (+11)	0	5 (−9)	0
1999	0	47	0	8	0
2003	0	38	1 (+1)	16 (+8)	0
2007	0	29 (−11)	2 (+1)	24 (+10)	0

== Coat of arms ==
Derwentside District Council were granted armorial bearings by the College of Arms in 1975. The letters patent were dated 8 May 1975, and the arms were blazoned as follows:

Barry wavy of eight Argent and Azure an Eagle displayed wings inverted Or gorged with a Mural Crown proper pendent therefrom by a ring a Cross of St. Cuthbert and charged on each wing with a like Cross Azure.

Crest: On a wreath of the colours In front of Flames a Miner's Pick head upwards in pale and two Swords points upwards in Saltire proper hilts and pomels Or pendent from the Pick by a Chain Argent a Roman Shield Sable charged with a Thunderbolt and on a Bordure Or ten Pellets.

Badge:A Fountain charged with an Eagle as in the Arms.

The shield had a field of silver and blue waves, representing the Rivers Derwent, Deerness and Browney. On top of this was placed a Roman eagle, for the Roman settlements at Ebchester, Lanchester, Dere Street and Stanley. About the eagle's neck was a mural crown representing a city wall, and thus local government. On the eagle's breast and wings were three crosses of Saint Cuthbert, patron saint of Durham: these suggested the union of three County Durham councils in one.

Upon a helm with torse and mantling was the crest. The swords and flames stood for the steel industry and the pickaxe for coalmining. Hanging from the axe was a Roman shield bearing a thunderbolt for the broadcasting station at Pontop Pike.

The Latin motto was Donec Defluet Amnis or Until the river ceases to flow. It was adapted from the writings of the Roman poet Horace.

== Town Twinning ==
Derwentside district was twinned with Werdohl in Germany.

== Abolition ==
The district was abolished as part of the 2009 structural changes to local government in England. On 1 April 2009 the two-tier system of administration in County Durham was replaced, with a unitary Durham County Council replacing both the existing county council and district councils.

In 2009, Durham County Council unveiled plans for the regeneration of Consett. These plans involved the demolition of the former headquarters of Derwentside District Council at Consett Civic Centre and the relocation of Consett AFC to Crookhall. The site was to be redeveloped and the new Consett Academy built there.

On 5 July 2010, the Secretary of State for Education announced plans for the overhaul of England's school building programme. The announcement stated that it would be "irresponsible to carry on regardless with an inflexible, and needlessly complex programme." Many building programmes that had not commenced were cancelled but the plans for Consett Academy and an academy at nearby Stanley were "for discussion."

Local opponents to the building of an academy on the Belle Vue site in Consett launched an application to have the land registered as a village green. This would prohibit the development of the land. A public inquiry was held at Consett Civic Centre during the week commencing 12 July 2010.

== Electoral wards ==
- Annfield Plain
- Benfieldside
- Blackhill
- Burnhope
- Burnopfield
- Castleside
- Catchgate
- Consett East
- Consett North
- Consett South
- Cornsay
- Craghead and South Stanley
- Delves Lane
- Dipton
- Ebchester and Medomsley
- Esh
- Havannah
- Lanchester
- Leadgate
- South Moor
- Stanley Hall
- Tanfield
