= Woodston =

Woodston may refer to:

- Woodston, Cambridgeshire, part of Peterborough, England
- Woodston, Kansas, USA
- Woodstone Village, County Durham, England
