= BeLeave =

British eurosceptic advocacy group

- Region served: United Kingdom
- Key people: Darren Grimes Shahmir Sanni Tom Harwood
- Affiliations: Vote Leave

BeLeave was a campaign group which campaigned for the United Kingdom's withdrawal from the European Union in the 2016 EU referendum. The group was set up to focus on younger voters.

== Background ==
BeLeave was set up as a "youth-focused pro-Brexit campaign" by Darren Grimes, at the time a 22-year-old fashion student and part-time shop worker, who was officially designated as Campaign Director of the organisation. In addition to Grimes, the BeLeave board consisted of Shahmir Sanni ('Secretary & Research Director') and Tom Harwood ('Head of Media & BeLeave Spokesperson'). Grimes was reported as working from Vote Leave's office and was invited to appear on several TV and radio programmes arguing for Britain to leave the EU. When Vote Leave was close to its £7m spending limit, Vote Leave emailed Grimes with offers of financial help, to which Grimes replied asking that the money be spent on Facebook ads to be placed by AggregateIQ. Vote Leave sent £675,000 in this way to AggregateIQ, without the money ever passing into the hands of Grimes or BeLeave. BeLeave had no significant income or expenditure apart from this.

BeLeave was described as a "Vote Leave Outreach Group" on the official Vote Leave webpage.

== Referral to the Electoral Commission ==
In March 2018 former BeLeave activist Shahmir Sanni claimed that BeLeave was used by Vote Leave to exceed legal spending limits. It was claimed that Vote Leave, the official campaign in favour of leaving the European Union in the Referendum, illegally used BeLeave as a channel for a payment of £675,000 to AggregateIQ, a Canadian company which worked on pro-Brexit projects, requiring that BeLeave spent the money in this way. Vote Leave would have exceeded its campaign spending limit of £7m had it spent the money itself.

=== Electoral Commission findings ===
On 17 July 2018, the Electoral Commission published the conclusions of its investigation into the campaign spending of Vote Leave and found that Vote Leave and Grimes had broken electoral law.

Vote Leave was fined £61,000. Grimes, representing BeLeave, was fined £20,000, the maximum permitted individual fine, for exceeding its spending limit as an unregistered campaigner by more than £660,000 and delivering an inaccurate and incomplete spending return.

== High Court of Justice findings against the Electoral Commission and BeLeave ==
On 14 September 2018, the High Court of Justice found against the Electoral Commission, stating that its advice to Vote Leave and Darren Grimes had been incorrect, but confirming that the overspending had been illegal.

=== Appeals ===
Vote Leave, which claimed they would not have paid BeLeave without the advice, initially appealed against their fine, but withdrew the appeal in March 2019.

Darren Grimes, who also began an appeal against his fine, did not withdraw in March 2019. On the 19th of July 2019, in the Central London County Court, Grimes successfully appealed the £20,000 fine levied for breaking electoral law in the lead up to the Brexit referendum, and the fine from the Electoral Commission was quashed. Judge Marc Dight said, "even if Grimes had committed the offence, it would not have justified the fine of £20,000, the maximum possible under current law." The Electoral Commission said: "We are disappointed that the court has upheld Mr Grimes's appeal. We will now review the full detail of the judgment before deciding on next steps." In August 2019, the Electoral Commission decided not to appeal against the ruling.

== See also ==
- Facebook–Cambridge Analytica data scandal
