= Framwelgate =

Area of Durham, England

Coordinates: 54.7814°N 1.5817°W

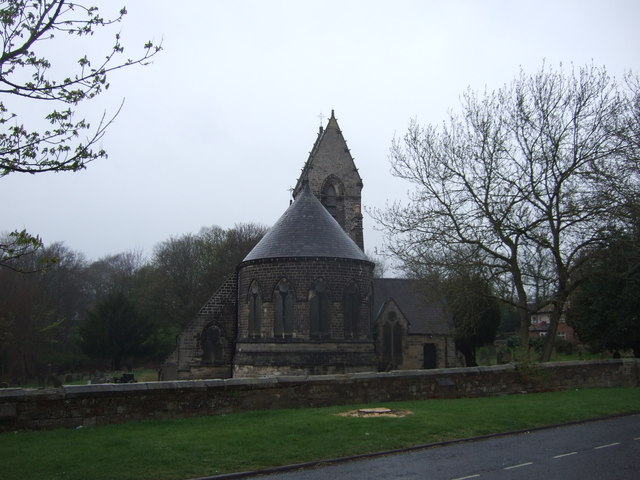
- St Cuthbert's Church

- Location within County Durham
- OS grid reference: NZ263443
- Civil parish: City of Durham
- Unitary authority: County Durham
- Ceremonial county: Durham
- Region: North East
- Country: England
- Sovereign state: United Kingdom
- Police: Durham
- Fire: County Durham and Darlington
- Ambulance: North East

Framwelgate (or Framwellgate) is an area of Durham, County Durham, England. It is adjoined by Crossgate, North End, Framwellgate Moor and the River Wear.

The origin of the place-name is from the Old English words fram and wella together with the Old Norse gata and means street by the strongly gushing spring. It appears as Framwelgat in 1352.

The 'Borough of Framwelgate' grew up following the construction of Framwellgate Bridge over the River Wear by Bishop Flambard in 1121. The roads Millburngate and Framwelgate became part the main route between Durham and the North. The area was home to wealthy Durham merchants and artisans until the 17th century. By the 19th century much of the area had developed into slum housing with coal mining occurring to the north of Framwelgate. These houses were demolished during the 1930s and residents moved to the newly built Sherburn Road Estate in Gilesgate.

Framwelgate is believed to have been named from a well at the head of the old street. This was connected to a pant in the Market Place. An honorary Pant Master continues to be appointed to this day. Above the well the road continues as Framwellgate Peth.

Framwelgate Peth continues towards Dryburn, Durham's place of execution until the construction of Durham Gaol. Saint John Boste was executed here in 1594 for being a Roman Catholic priest. While name Dryburn is popularly claimed to derive from a stream that dried up following the execution of a Jesuit or a corruption of Tyburn (London's place of execution), Victor Watts has shown the name, deriving from the middle English for 'dry stream' was being used by at least the 14th century.

A mediaeval leper hospital, St. Leonard's is believed to have been sited just south of Dryburn until its demolition in 1652/53.

Framwellgate was formerly a township in the parish of Durham-St Oswald, in 1866 Framwellgate became a separate civil parish, on 1 April 1916 the parish was abolished to form Durham. In 1911 the parish had a population of 3235.

Prior to the 1974 local government re-organisation the municipal borough covering central Durham was styled "The City of Durham and Framwelgate".
