= North Lodge =

Civil parish in County Durham, England

Coordinates: 54.87474°N 1.57274°W

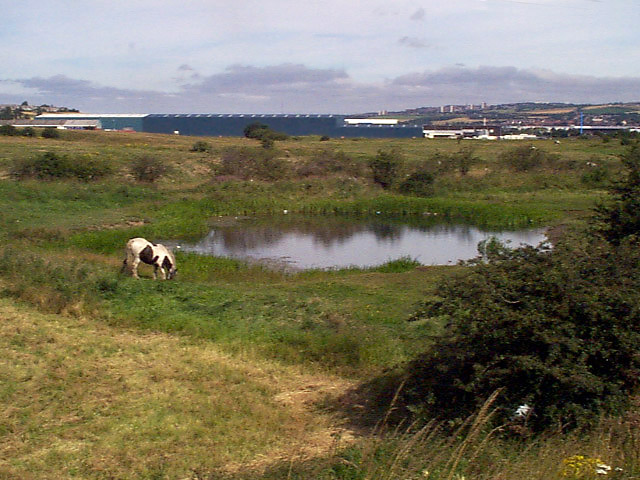
- Batley's Pond on the Drum Industrial Estate in the parish

- Location within County Durham
- Population: 2,684 (2021 census)
- Civil parish: North Lodge
- District: County Durham
- Shire county: County Durham
- Region: North East
- Country: England
- Sovereign state: United Kingdom

North Lodge is a civil parish in County Durham, England. The parish covers an area lying to the north of the town of Chester-le-Street, and includes Lambton Castle.

The parish was created on 1 April 1974 under the Local Government Act 1972, which divided the former parish of Harraton between Tyne and Wear and County Durham. The part of Harraton within the designated area for the new town of Washington (including Harraton village itself) was transferred to the metropolitan borough of Sunderland. The remainder of the former Harraton parish stayed in County Durham and became a new parish called North Lodge, taking its name from a lodge house on North Road which stood beside one of the former driveways leading to Lambton Castle.

North Lodge Parish Council generally meets at the Park View Lower School on Lombard Drive.
