= Andrew Husband =

British entrepreneur and politician

Cllr Andrew Husband

Leader of Durham County Council
- Incumbent
- Assumed office 21 May 2025
- Deputy: Darren Grimes
- Preceded by: Amanda Hopgood

Member of Durham County Council
- Incumbent
- Assumed office 1 May 2025
- Ward: Chester-le-Street North
- Preceded by: Tracie Jane Smith

Personal details
- Born: 1978 (age 47–48) Chester-le-Street, County Durham, United Kingdom
- Party: Reform UK (since 2019)
- Occupation: Entrepreneur
- Known for: Leading Durham County Council from May 2025

Andrew John Husband is a British entrepreneur and politician who has served as the Reform UK Leader of Durham County Council and as Durham County Councillor for Chester-le-Street North since May 2025.

== Early life ==
Husband was born and raised in Chester-le-Street. He attended Gateshead College before studying for a business degree in Leeds which involved working in foreign countries including in the USA and Belgium. He has previously worked in sales and as a male model in his younger years.

== Business career ==
When announced as the leader of Reform UK in Durham County Council, a party spokesman said Husband was "a business leader with a proven track record of growth in startups and building successful teams". He previously owned UHC Leisure Ltd.

Husband set up United Hygiene and Catering Equipment, his first major business venture, in December 2015. It was an equipment supplier for hospitality industry. It entered creditors' voluntary liquidation in May 2023 with debts exceeding £1,000,000. Liquidators reported there were insufficient funds to repay creditors or former employees. Private Eye reported that the company supplied Durham County Council with 10,000 IIR surgical masks in March 2020 during the COVID-19 pandemic at a price it said was higher than the NHS average at the time.

Later, in October 2016, Husband set up Eco-Vent as an installer of industrial machinery and equipment. It was later taken over and re-branded as Restaurant Kitchen. The Sunday Times has reported Restaurant Kitchen contributed to the repayment of money owed by United Hygiene and Catering Equipment in what it called "an unusual arrangement" but this was incorrect. Husband resigned as a director of Eco-Vent in July 2022 before it became registered as Restaurant Kitchen Ltd. Corrections were later confirmed by The Sunday Times after an IPSO was raised

UHC Leisure was incorporated in 2019 and traded as the Red Lion Hotel. It too entered administration in July 2025, owing £446,926 to creditors. Husband said UHC Leisure leased a pub and hotel in County Durham that was forced to close due to an electrical fire. Husband was also previously a director of UHC Hotels until stepping down in April 2022. The company entered liquidation later the same year, owing debts of £85,000, including £13,000 to Durham County Council.

Combined liabilities across Husband's companies are reportedly between £1.5 million and £1.7 million by The Times but this was later corrected. He has said he exited hospitality during the COVID-19 pandemic and blamed government economic policy at that time. Following reporting on the companies, some political opponents called for Husband to resign as a councillor. However, he denied any suggestion of wrongdoing and said many failures occurred after he left directorship positions. He told newspapers he had generated about £20 million of new business from scratch over a decade. Husband continues to work in several director positions across various finance and investment companies.He was appointed director of the Local Government Association in July 2026 and holds director roles with Newcastle Airport, Durham Cricket and is also the Chair of the LGA Audit and Risk Committee.

== Political career ==
Husband is a member of Nigel Farage's Reform UK party. He is a supporter of Farage, and said he provided him with a political home.

=== 2019 General Election ===
During the 2019 General Election, Husband ran as the Brexit Party (later renamed as Reform UK in 2021) candidate for North Tyneside. He gained 5,254 votes, a vote share of 10.4%, ultimately being unsuccessful in his bid to be elected as the constituency's MP.

=== 2024 General Election ===
In the 2024 General Election, Husband ran as the Reform candidate for the North Durham constituency. He gained 10,689 votes while the Labour Party candidate, Luke Akehurst, gained 16,562 votes and was therefore elected as the MP for the constituency. Husband did, however, beat the Conservative Party candidate, George Carter, who received 6,492 votes. Husband said Reform's gain in momentum in the election was due to the charisma of Nigel Farage and his ability to connect with the public as well as a focus on the cost of living crisis.

=== 2025 Local Elections ===
Husband stood as a candidate for Reform in the Chester-le-Street North ward in Durham County Council during the 2025 United Kingdom local elections. Amid Reform making significant gains nationally during the local elections, he was elected as one of two councillors for the ward after receiving 1,139 votes, 20.9% of the total number received. On 14 May 2025, fellow councillors elected Husband as the leader of the Reform group of councillors in Durham County Council and as the leader of the council. Before taking on the role, Husband said in an interview that he wanted to take considered, deliberate actions to provide the public with greater value for money. He was formally appointed as the new leader of the council in its Annual Meeting on 21 May 2025, saying he wanted to "grasp the opportunity that people have given us to make a difference".

=== Leader of Durham County Council ===
On 21 May 2025, the day on which Reform assumed full control of the council, it took down LGBTQ+ and Ukraine flags at the council headquarters, which were in solidarity with the Pride movement and Russo-Ukrainian War, respectively. This decision faced criticism, including from Liberal Democrat councillor Ellie Hopgood, Durham Pride chair Mel Metcalf, and Bishop Auckland Pride director Thomas Wales.

After Reform set up a unit to scrutinise public spending, inspired by Elon Musk's Department of Government Efficiency (DOGE), Husband said the unit would be auditing Durham County Council in the future. The Reform party leader, Nigel Farage, had previously said any of the council's staff working "on climate change initiatives or Diversity, Equity and Inclusion...better really be seeking alternative careers very, very quickly" after his party took control of the council. Husband later downplayed Farage's comments, saying the party would take time to carefully review council data before taking any action. However, on the day Reform took control of the council, it renamed several of its departments to remove references to climate change and equality and inclusion.

In April 2026, ChronicleLive reported that Husband had used a homophobic slur on social media during an exchange with a local Labour Party group, who described the language as "damaging rhetoric". In August 2026, news reporting and former Reform councillors described widespread infighting, bullying, and suppression of dissent from the party's council leadership, including Husband. A debate on mental health among Reform councillors devolved into personal accusations and attacks. Reform councillors drank wine and vaped during a council meeting over the issue, with Husband reportedly describing discussions of mental health as "woke". After further corroborating reporting by Sky News, Husband and his deputy, Darren Grimes, issued statements on social media defending their governance and criticising Sky and the former councillors featured in the reporting.

== Views ==
Husband has voiced anti-vaccine conspiracy theories, including saying that mRNA vaccines are "the most dangerous product ever forced upon the public" and that COVID-19 vaccines will come to be considered "the greatest crime against humanity". He retweeted a video claiming US President Joe Biden said the 2024 Texas wildfires were caused by the targeted use of directed-energy weapons. Husband has called Charles III a "climate cracker" over his environmental advocacy, and described Volodymyr Zelenskyy, the President of Ukraine during its war against Russia, as "evil and corrupt".
