= Durham County Council =

Local authority in North East England

Type
- Type: Unitary authority

Leadership
- Chair: Robbie Rodiss, Reform UK since 21 May 2025
- Leader: Andrew Husband, Reform UK since 21 May 2025
- Chief Executive: John Hewitt since December 2020

Structure
- Seats: 98 councillors
- Graph of the party split among 98 seats.
- Political groups: Administration (51) Reform (51) Other parties (47) Liberal Democrats (15) Labour (5) Green (2) Conservative (1) SDP (1) Independent (23)
- Joint committees: North East Combined Authority
- Length of term: 4 years

Elections
- Voting system: First past the post
- Last election: 1 May 2025
- Next election: 3 May 2029

Meeting place
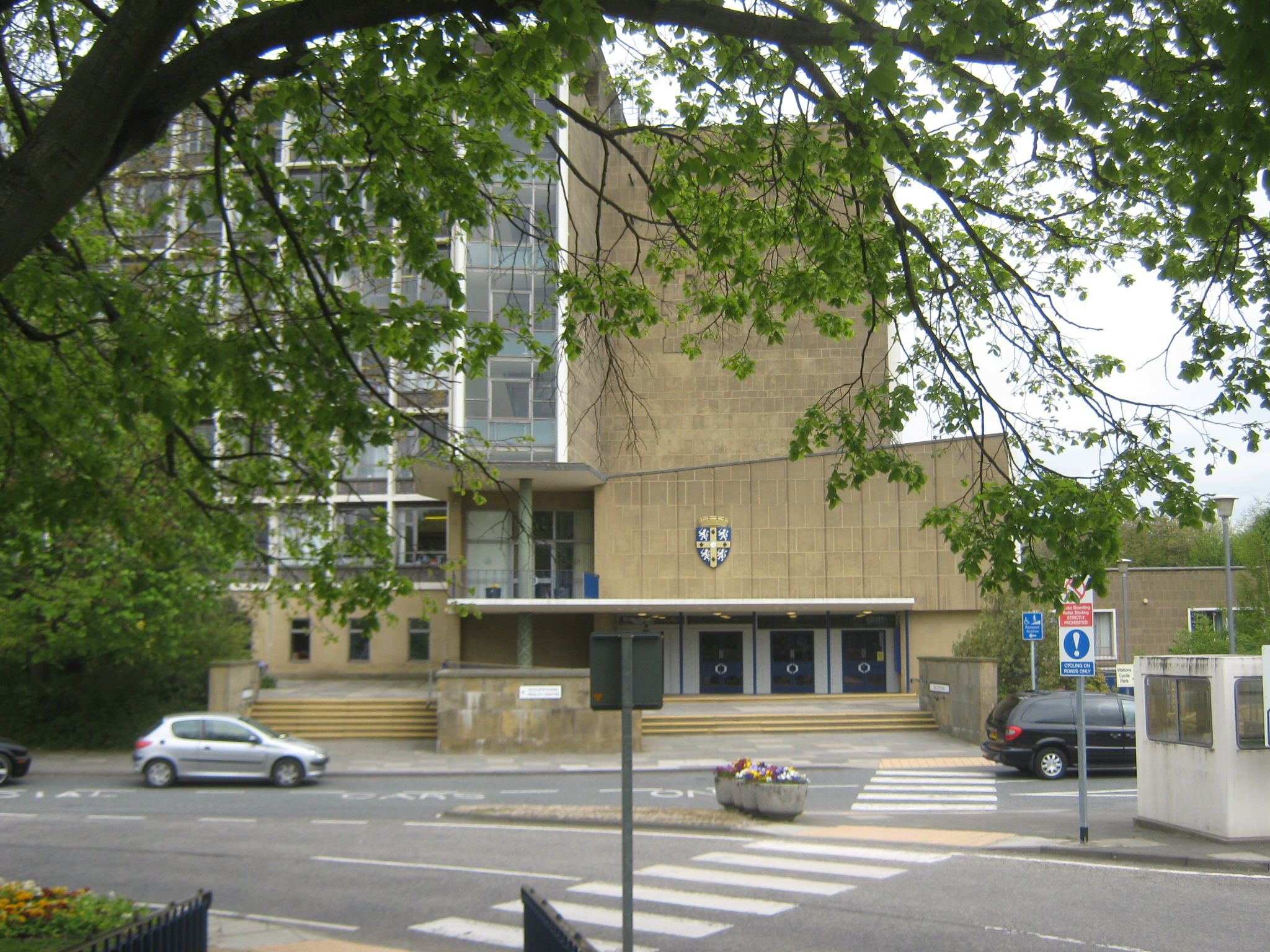
- County Hall, Aykley Heads, Durham, DH1 5UL

Website
- www.durham.gov.uk

Durham County Council is the local authority for the unitary authority area of County Durham in North East England. The unitary authority area is smaller than the ceremonial county of Durham, which additionally includes Darlington, Hartlepool, and part of Stockton-on-Tees. The council has its headquarters at County Hall in the city of Durham, and consists of 98 councillors. It is a member of the North East Combined Authority.

Since the 2025 Durham County Council election the council has been under the majority control of Reform UK. The chair of the council is Robbie Rodis, and the leader is Andrew Husband. The council had a Labour Party majority from 1925 until 2021, when it fell into no overall control.

Between 1889 and 1974 Durham consisted of an administrative county governed by a county council, and several county boroughs with their own councils. In 1974, as part of reforms to local government in England, Durham was reconstituted as a two-tier non-metropolitan county governed by a county council and eight district councils. In 1997, the Borough of Darlington was reconstituted as a unitary authority, making it independent of the county council. Durham County Council was itself reconstituted as a unitary authority in 2009, when the seven remaining district councils were abolished and the county council took on their responsibilities.

== History ==
Elected county councils were established in 1889 under the Local Government Act 1888, taking over administrative functions previously carried out by unelected magistrates at the quarter sessions. The boroughs of Gateshead, South Shields and Sunderland were considered large enough to provide their own county-level services and so they were made county boroughs, independent from Durham County Council. The county council was elected by and provided services to the rest of the county, which area was termed the administrative county.

Additional county boroughs were later created at West Hartlepool in 1902 and Darlington in 1915. In 1967 West Hartlepool merged with the neighbouring borough of Hartlepool (which had just covered the old town), with the enlarged county borough thereafter being called Hartlepool. Stockton-on-Tees, Billingham and surrounding areas were removed from the administrative county in 1968 to become part of the County Borough of Teesside.

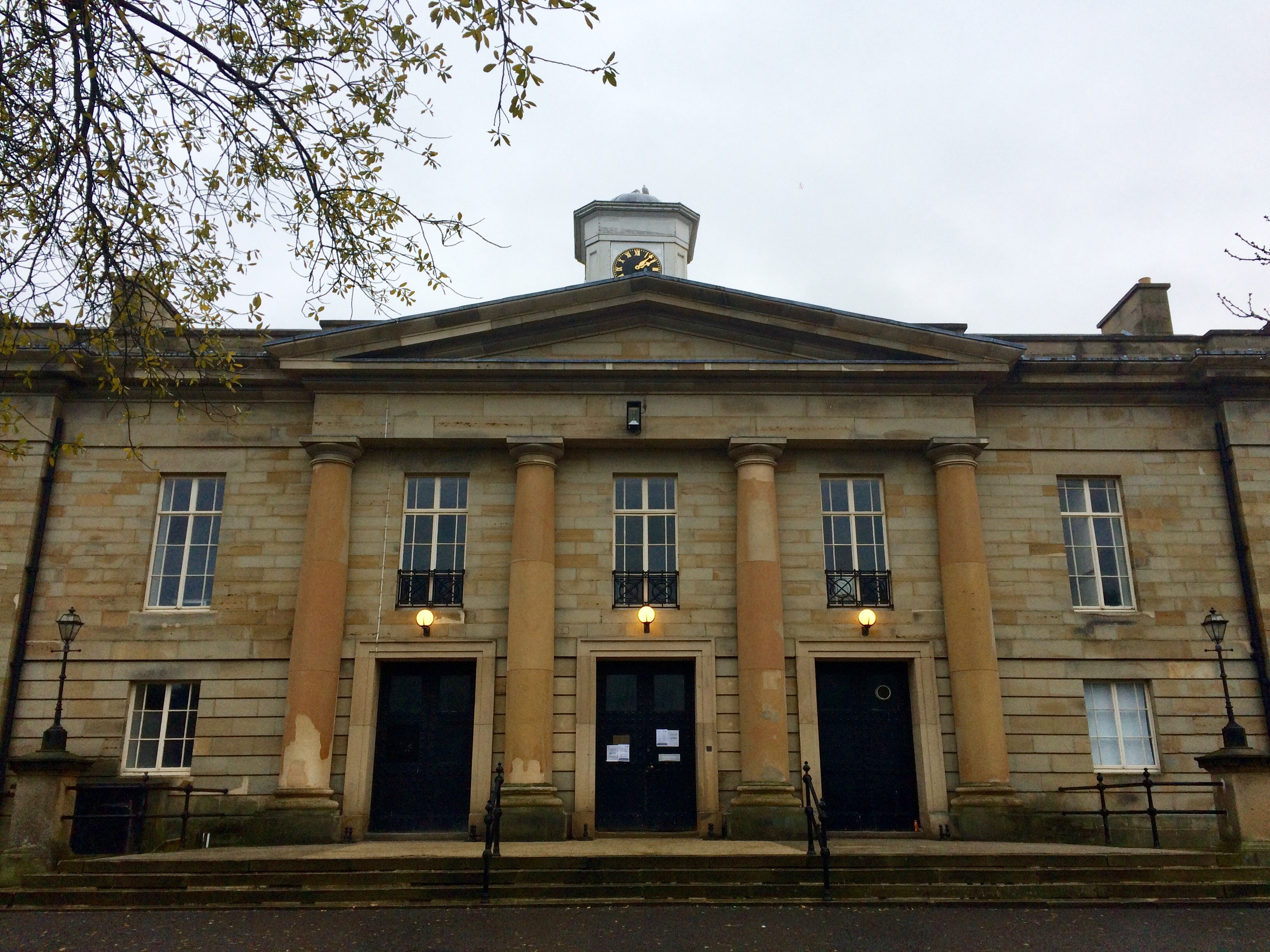
Durham Crown Court, formerly Shire Hall: Council's first meeting place 1889–1898

The first elections took place in January 1889 and the county council formally came into being on 1 April 1889. On that day its first official meeting was held at the old Shire Hall on Old Elvet in Durham, the courthouse (built 1811) which had served as the meeting place of the quarter sessions which preceded the county council. The first chairman of the council was John Lloyd Wharton, who was the Conservative Member of Parliament for Ripon (in Yorkshire); he had also been chairman of the Durham Quarter Sessions since 1871.

Durham was the first county council to be controlled by the Labour Party, which won the most seats in 1919.

In 1974, the county was redesignated as a non-metropolitan county under the Local Government Act 1972. As part of those reforms the county ceded territory in the north-east to the new county of Tyne and Wear and in the south-east to the new county of Cleveland, but gained the former Startforth Rural District covering the part of Teesdale south of the River Tees from the North Riding of Yorkshire, and Darlington was brought back under the county council's control.

Until 1974, the lower tier of local government comprised numerous boroughs, urban districts and rural districts. The districts were also reorganised in 1974 into eight non-metropolitan districts: Chester-le-Street, Darlington, Derwentside, Durham, Easington, Sedgefield, Teesdale, and Wear Valley.

In 1997, Darlington became a unitary authority, removing it from county council control. Durham County Council itself became a unitary authority on 1 April 2009, when the seven remaining non-metropolitan districts of the county were abolished and the county council absorbed their functions. The legislation which made the county council a unitary authority allowed the council to omit the word 'County' from its name to become 'Durham Council', but in the event the name 'Durham County Council' was kept. (Note: Like most unitary authorities, the way County Durham was legally made a unitary authority was by creating both a county and a district which cover the same area and then directing that only one of them should have a council, which performs both district and county functions. Unusually, the county and district have different names in this case: the non-metropolitan county (which had been created and named in the Local Government Act 1972) is called 'Durham', the non-metropolitan district created in the 2009 reforms is called 'County Durham'. The district does not have its own council, but the county council has been given district-level functions in addition to the county-level functions it already had.)

In 2024 a combined authority was established covering Durham, Gateshead, Newcastle upon Tyne, North Tyneside, Northumberland, South Tyneside and Sunderland, called the North East Mayoral Combined Authority. It is chaired by the directly elected Mayor of the North East and oversees the delivery of certain strategic functions across the area.

== Governance ==
Comparison of districts within Durham, 1974-2009 (left), and from 2009 (right)
County council area Unitary

Since 2009, Durham County Council has provided both county-level and district-level services. Much of the county is also covered by civil parishes, which form a lower tier of local government for their areas.

=== Political control ===
The council has been under Reform UK majority control since the 2025 election.

Durham was the first county council to be controlled by Labour, who took power in 1919. Between 1922 and 1925, the council was under no overall control with a Labour minority administration. From 1925 until 2021, Labour held a majority. Political control since 1919 has been as follows:

Party in control	Years
Administrative county
Labour	1919–1922
No overall control	1922–1925
Labour	1925–1974
Two-tier non-metropolitan county
Labour	1974–2009
Unitary authority
Labour	2009–2021
No overall control	2021–2025
Reform	2025–present

=== Leadership ===
The leaders of the council since 1989 have been:

Councillor	Party	From	To
Don Robson	Labour	1989	Jun 2001
Ken Manton	Labour	Jun 2001	10 May 2006
Albert Nugent	Labour	10 May 2006	May 2008
Simon Henig	Labour	23 May 2008	May 2021
Amanda Hopgood	Liberal Democrats	26 May 2021	May 2025
Andrew Husband	Reform	21 May 2025	Present

=== Composition ===
Following the 2025 election and subsequent changes up to September 2026, the composition of the council was:

Party	Seats
Reform	50
Liberal Democrats	15
Labour	5
Green	2
Conservative	1
SDP	1
Independent	23
Vacant	1
Total	98

Of the independent councillors, seven sit with the Green Party as the "Durham County Council Independent Group", four form the "County Durham Independent Alliance", two form the "Spennymoor and Tudhoe Independent Group", and the other nine are not aligned to any group. The next full council elections are due in 2029.

== Elections ==
From the previous boundary changes in 2013 the council comprised 126 councillors representing 63 electoral divisions, with each division electing one, two or three councillors. Elections are held every four years. New division boundaries were drawn up to take effect from the 2025 election, reducing the number of councillors to 98.

== Premises ==
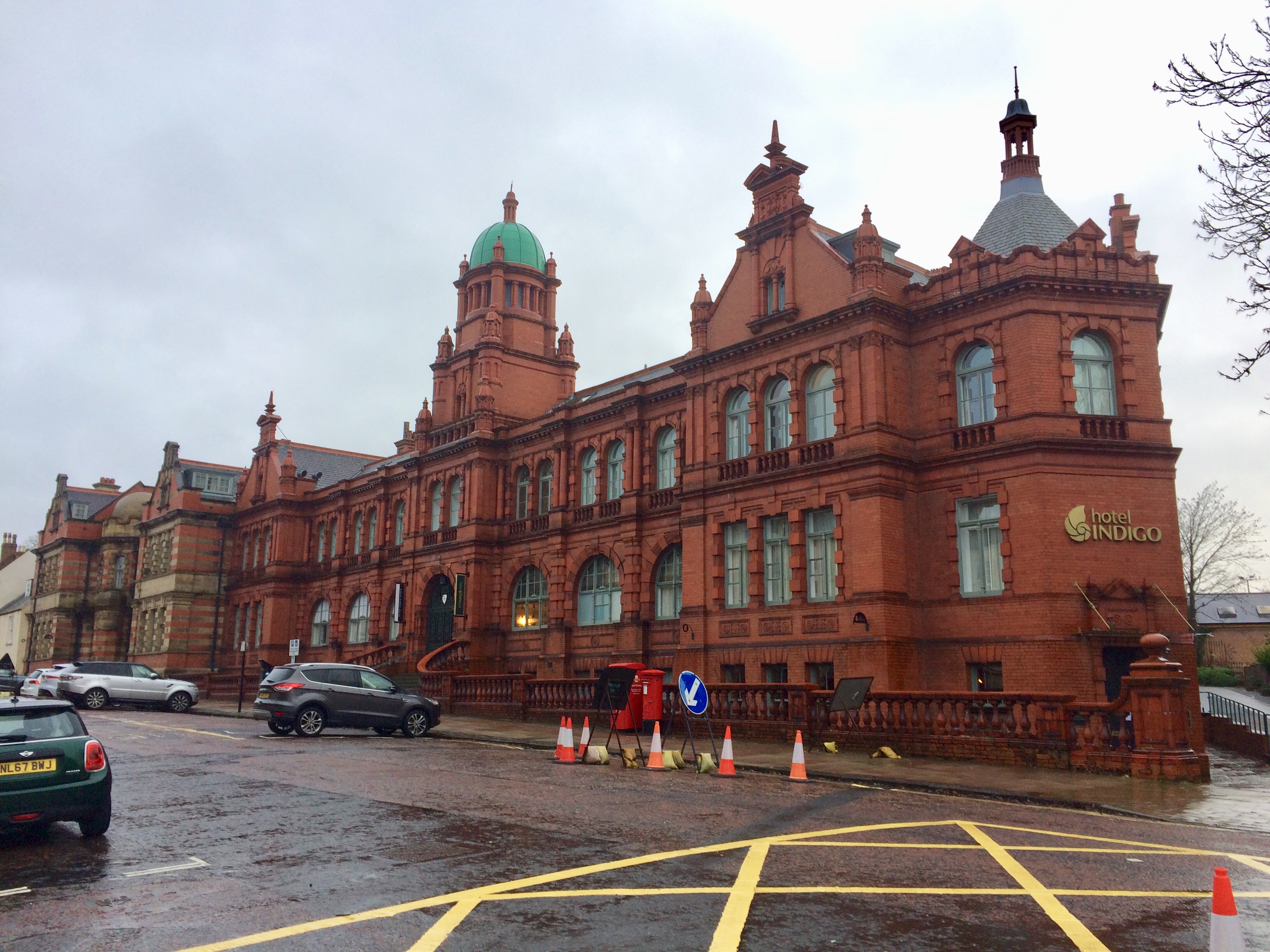
Shire Hall, Old Elvet: Council's headquarters 1898–1963

The council is based at County Hall at Aykley Heads in the northern suburbs of the city of Durham. The building was purpose-built for the council and was completed in 1963.

When first created the council met at the courthouse on Old Elvet, which at the time was known as Shire Hall. A few years after its creation the council decided to build its own headquarters on a site nearby, also on Old Elvet, which was also given the name Shire Hall. The new building was completed in 1898, after which the old Shire Hall became known as the Assizes Court, and since 1971 as Durham Crown Court.

The council has announced plans to move to the Rivergreen building, also in the Aykley Heads area of Durham, in 2025, with the intention that County Hall would then be redeveloped.

== Coat of arms ==
Coat of arms of Durham County Council
Granted 10 May 1974 Coronet A mural crown Or Escutcheon Azure, a Cross Or square pierced of the field between four Lions rampant Argent each ducally crowned Or and grasping in the dexter claw a Sword in bend sinister proper pommel and hilt also Or as many Lozenges Sable in the fess point a Rose Argent barbed and seeded proper Banner the banner of arms of the council

Awards and achievements
Preceded by Greenwich London Borough Council	LGC Council of the Year; 2014	Succeeded by Glasgow City Council
