= Sir John Duck, 1st Baronet =

Sir John Duck, 1st Baronet (c. 1632 – 26 August 1691), was mayor of Durham.

== Life ==
Duck was apprenticed early in life to a butcher at Durham, though from an entry in the guild registers, it appears that in 1657 some opposition was raised to his following the trade. The foundation of his subsequent fortunes is said to have been laid by the following incident. 'As he was straying in melancholy idleness by the waterside, a raven appeared hovering in the air, and from chance or fright dropped from his bill a gold Jacobus at the foot of the happy butcher boy.' This adventure was depicted on a panel in the house which he afterwards built for himself in Durham, where he became exceedingly prosperous, and in 1680 served the office of mayor.

Taking an active part in politics during the last years of the Stuarts, Duck attracted the attention of the government, and in 1686 his useful loyalty was rewarded when he was created a baronet, of Haswell-on-the-Hill in the County of Durham, named after the manor he had purchased with his accumulated wealth in the year of his mayoralty. He built and endowed a hospital at Lumley, but as he had no issue, his title became extinct at his death, 26 August 1691.

Baronetage of England
New creation	Baronet (of Haswell-on-the-Hill); 1687–1691	Extinct
