= Woodstone Village =

Hamlet in County Durham, England

Coordinates: 54.847°N 1.518°W

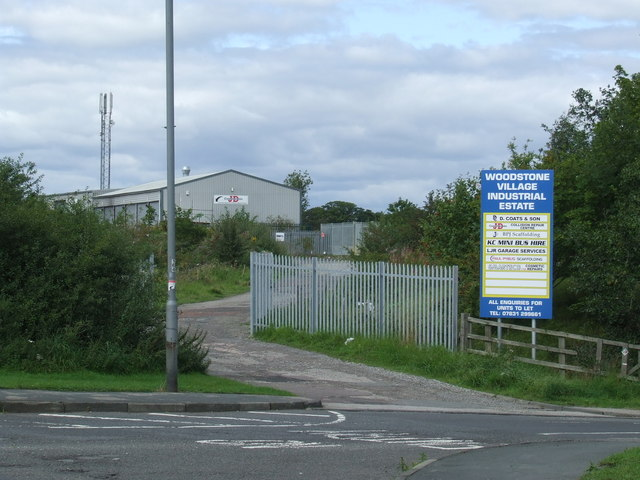
- Woodstone Village Industrial Estate

- Location within County Durham
- Civil parish: Little Lumley
- Unitary authority: County Durham
- Ceremonial county: County Durham
- Region: North East
- Country: England
- Sovereign state: United Kingdom

Woodstone Village is a hamlet in the civil parish of Little Lumley, in the County Durham district, in the ceremonial county of Durham, England. It neighbours the larger villages of Fencehouses and Burnmoor. The local towns are Chester-le-Street and Houghton-le-Spring.

It originally was named Little Lumley, being only a short journey from Great Lumley and consisted of 5 streets of houses, Finchale Terrace, High Row, Middle Row, Lower Row and Woodstone Terrace, which were built as housing for the now disused '6 pit' mine, in the area.

Recently the addition of a large estate built by a housing company on the site of the former brick works has expanded the village.

The only amenities in the village are the Athena beauty salon, and the Fencehouses community centre which contains a gym as well as childcare and nursery facilities. The village also includes an industrial estate from which several companies such as Par petroleum, County coaches and Leisure caravans operate out of.

The village is served by the 78 bus which runs between Sunderland and Consett and the 71 bus which runs between Seaham and Chester-le-Street.
