= County Durham (district) =

Unitary authority area in County Durham, England

- Unitary authority area
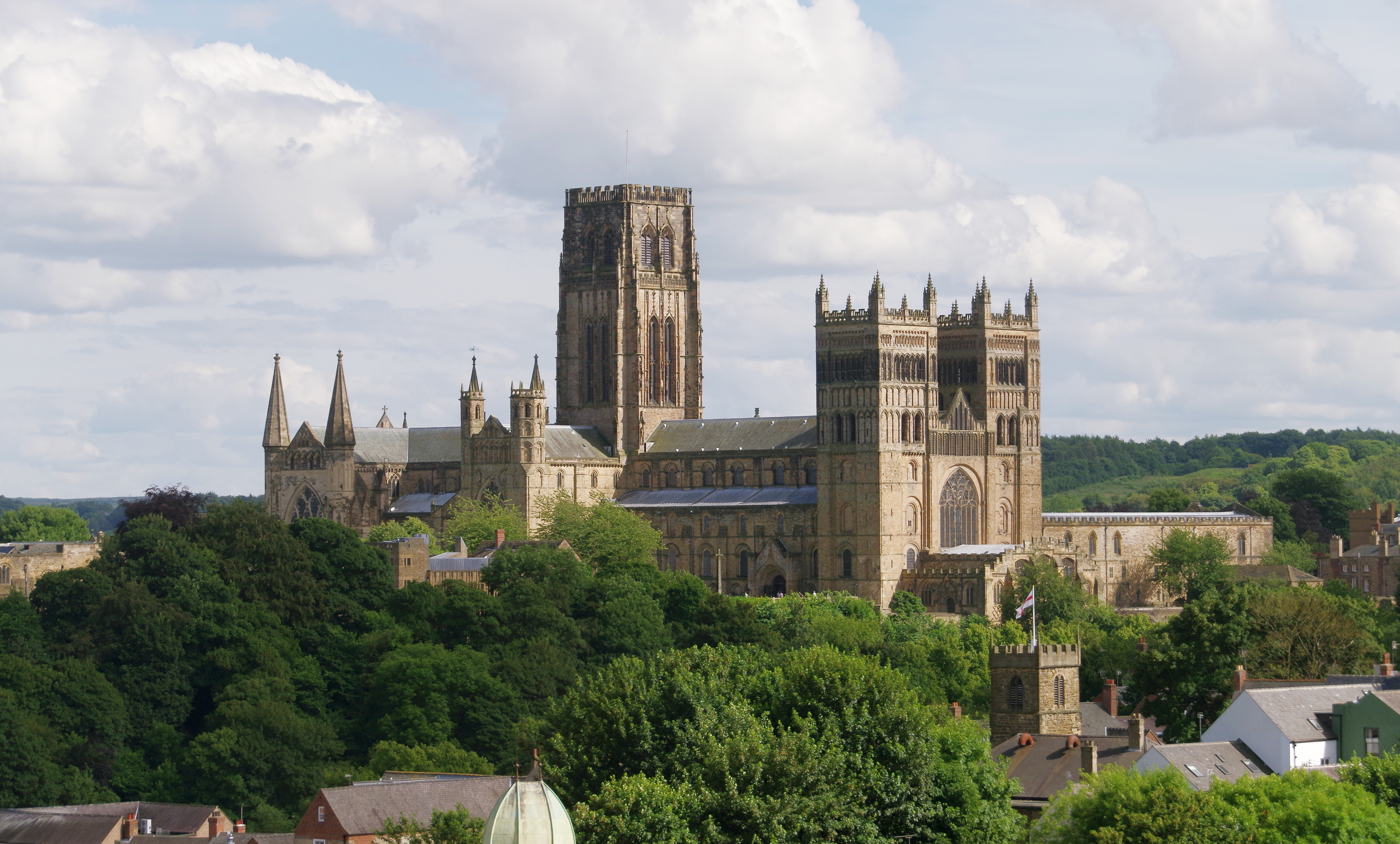
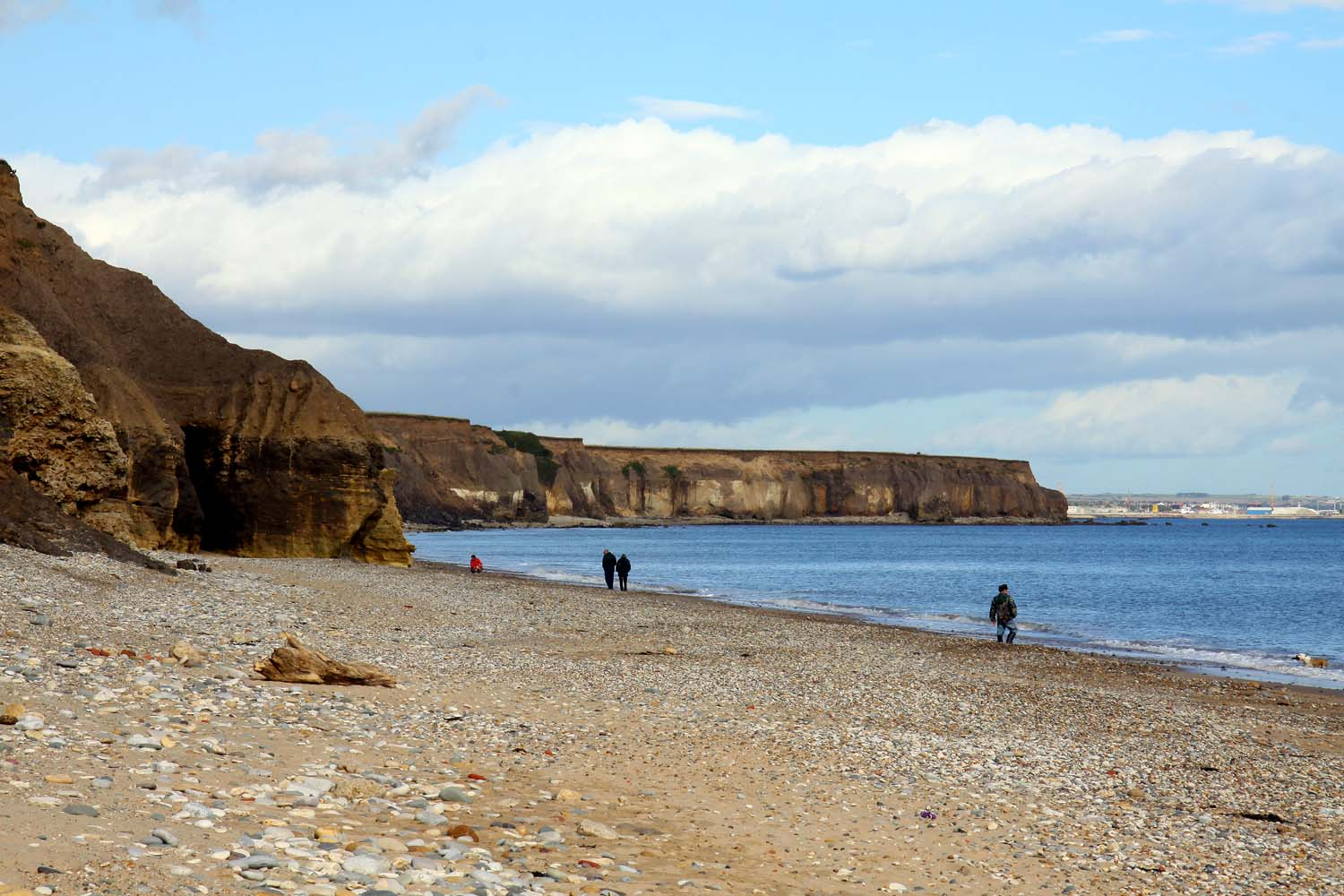
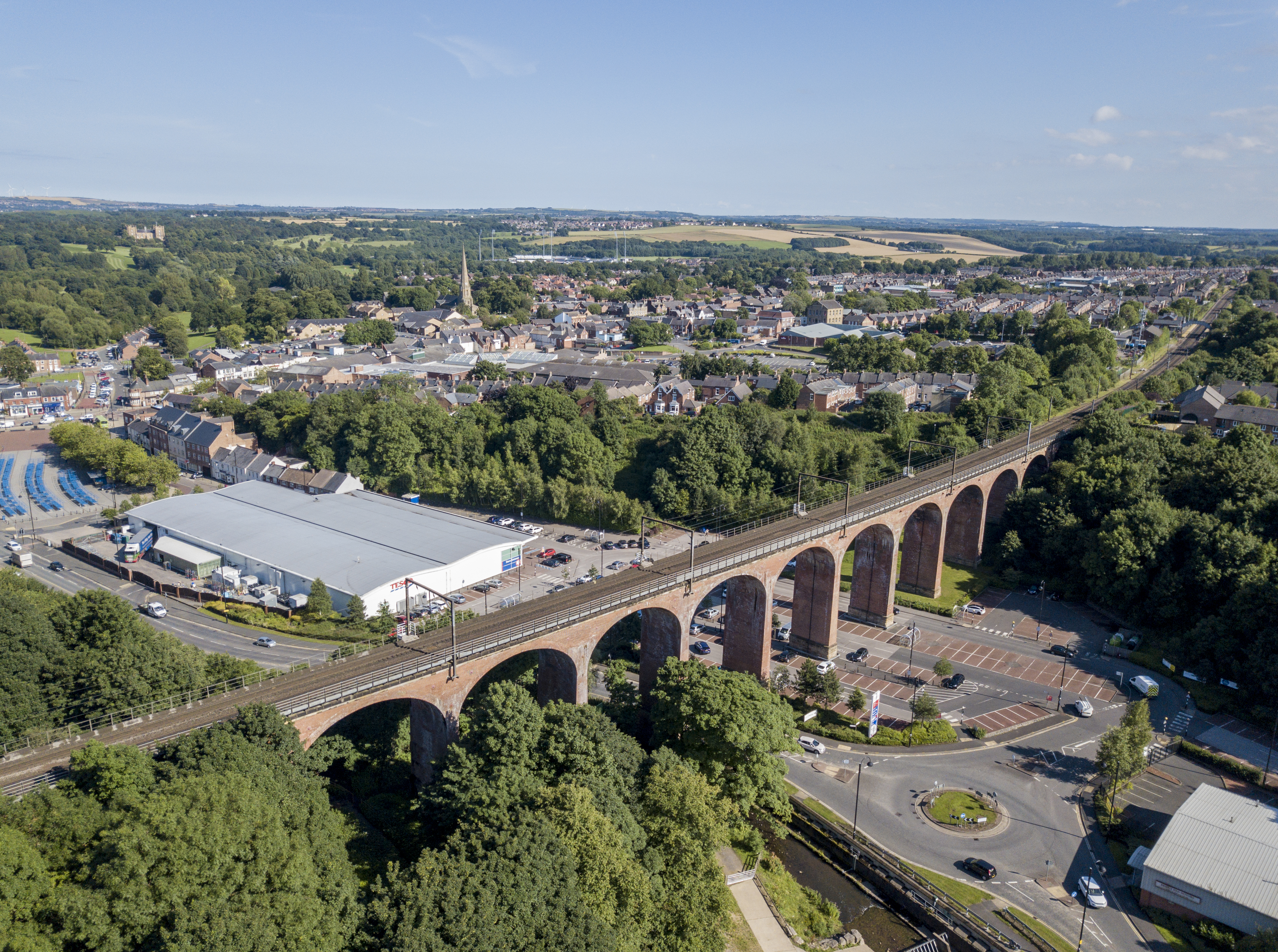
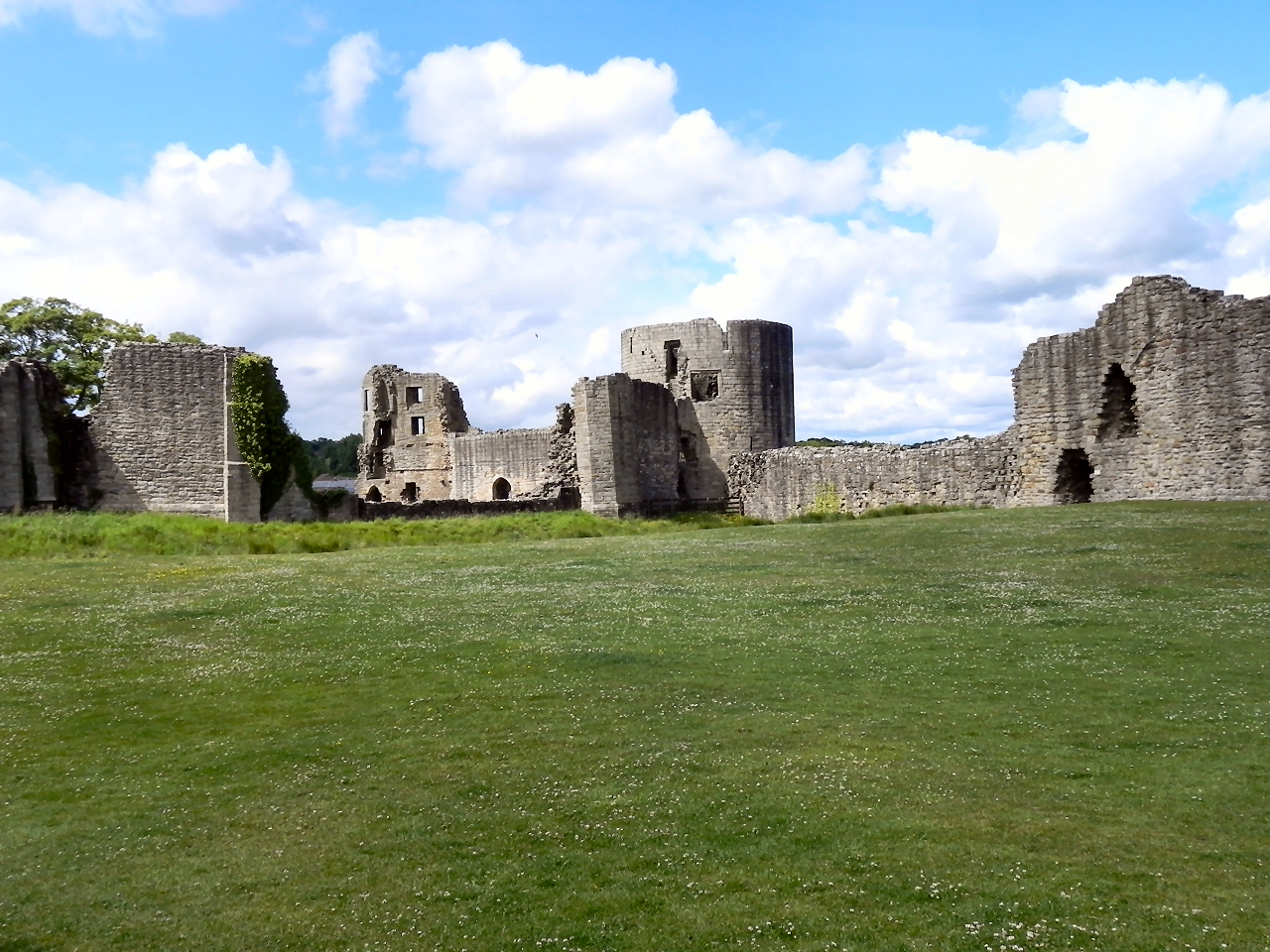
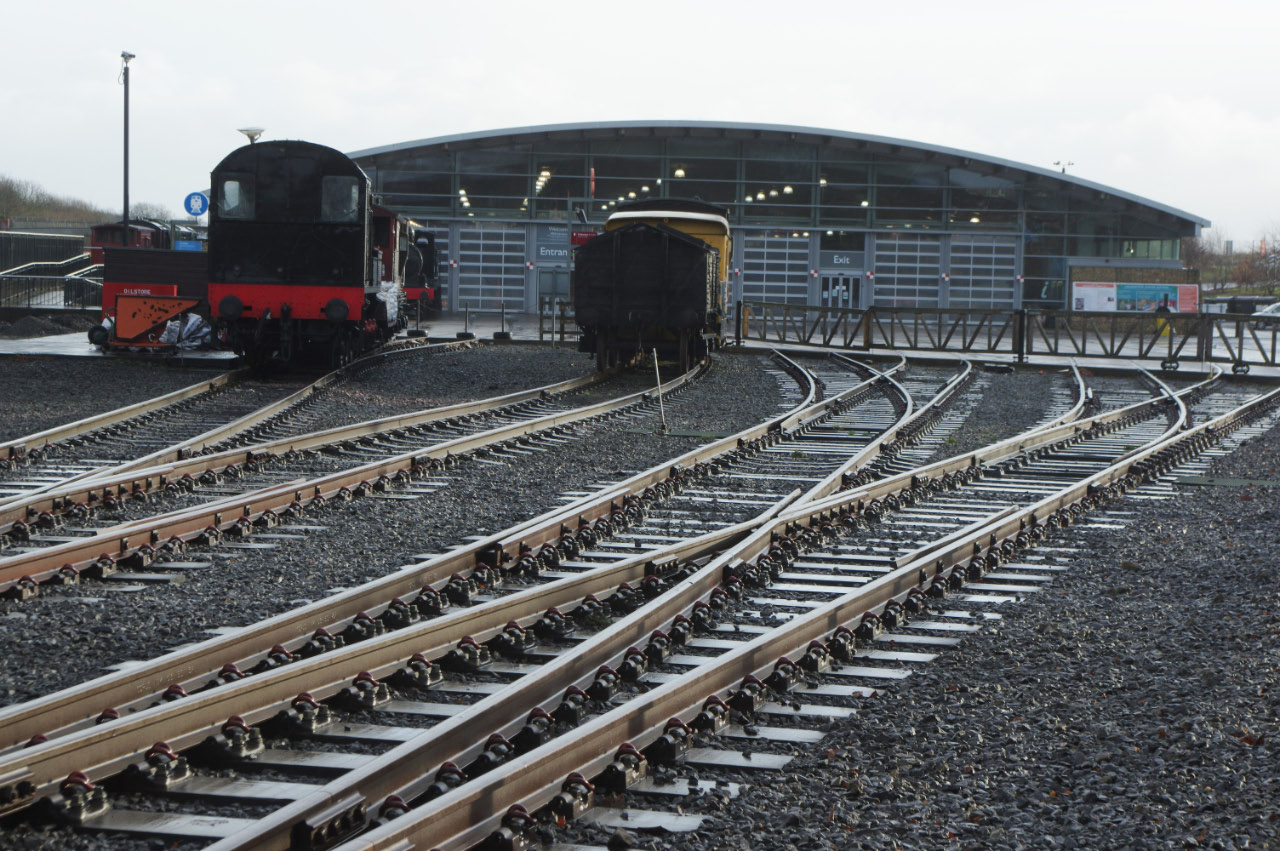
- From left to right; Top: Durham Cathedral; Middle: Seaham Beach and Chester-le-Street aerial; Bottom: Barnard Castle and Shildon Locomotion Museum

- Flag Coat of arms

- Shown within ceremonial County Durham
- Coordinates: 54.7143°N 1.7976°W
- Sovereign state: United Kingdom
- Country: England
- Region: North East
- Ceremonial county: County Durham
- City region: North East
- Historic counties: County Durham; Yorkshire (North Riding)
- Created: 1 April 2009
- Named for: County Durham
- Administrative HQ: County Hall, Durham

Government
  - Type: Unitary authority
  - Body: Durham County Council
  - Executive: Leader and cabinet
  - Control: Reform UK
  - Leader: Andrew Husband (R)
  - Chair: Joan Nicholson
  - MPs: 6 MPs: Luke Akehurst (L); Mary Kelly Foy (L); Grahame Morris (L); Sam Rushworth (L); Alan Strickland (L); Liz Twist (L)

Area
  - Total: 859 sq mi (2,226 km^{2})
  - Rank: 11th

Population (2025)
  - Total: 539,146
  - Rank: 10th
  - Density: 630/sq mi (242/km^{2})

Ethnicity (2021)
  - Ethnic groups: List: 96.8% White; 1.5% Asian; 0.9% Mixed; 0.4% other; 0.3% Black

Religion (2021)
  - Religion: List: 54.6% Christianity; 38.6% no religion; 0.6% Islam; 0.2% Buddhism; 0.2% Hinduism; 0.2% Sikhism; 0.1% Judaism; 0.4% other; 5.1% not stated
- Time zone: UTC+0 (GMT)
  - Summer (DST): UTC+1 (BST)
- Postcode areas: DH1–99
- Dialling codes: 0191
- ISO 3166 code: GB-DUR
- GSS code: E06000047
- Website: durham.gov.uk

County Durham is a unitary authority area in the ceremonial county of County Durham, England. It is governed by Durham County Council. The district has an area of 2,226 square kilometres (859 sq mi), and contains 135 civil parishes. It forms part of the larger ceremonial county of Durham, together with boroughs of Darlington, Hartlepool, and the part of Stockton-on-Tees north of the River Tees.

== History ==
Between 1974 and April 2009, County Durham was governed as a two-tier non-metropolitan county, with a county council and district councils. The original eight districts were Chester-le-Street, Darlington, Derwentside, Durham (city), Easington, Sedgefield, Teesdale, and Wear Valley. In 1997 Darlington was removed from the non-metropolitan county and became a separate unitary authority. In 2009 the remaining districts were abolished and replaced by a single district covering the non-metropolitan county, with Durham County Council as the sole local authority.

== Geography ==
The district has multiple hamlets and villages. Settlements with town status include Consett, Barnard Castle, Peterlee, Seaham, Bishop Auckland, Newton Aycliffe, Middleton-in-Teesdale, Shildon, Chester-le-Street, Crook, Stanley, Willington, Stanhope, Spennymoor, Ferryhill and Sedgefield while Durham is the only city in the district.

Neighbouring council areas
Local authority	In relation to the district
Northumberland	North
Gateshead	North east
City of Sunderland	North east
Hartlepool	South east
Stockton-on-Tees	South east
Darlington	South
North Yorkshire	South
Westmorland and Furness	West

== Governance ==
Following the 2025 Durham County Council election, the council is under control of Reform UK.

== Economy ==
The main industries that people in County Durham work in are retail, health and social work, and manufacturing. The three largest industry groups (Note: The industry groups are derived from the UK's Standard Industrial Classification.) for jobs based in the district are education, health, and manufacturing, while the three largest for businesses (Note: Covering all businesses registered for VAT.) are construction, retail, and professional, scientific, and technical services.

== Education ==
Durham LEA has a comprehensive school system with 36 state secondary schools (not including sixth form colleges) and five independent schools (four in Durham and one in Barnard Castle). Easington district has the largest school population by year, and Teesdale has the smallest with two schools. Only one school in Easington and Derwentside districts have sixth forms, with about half the schools in the other districts having sixth forms.

== Media ==
Local TV coverage is provided by BBC North East and Cumbria and ITV Tyne Tees. Local radio stations include BBC Radio Newcastle, BBC Radio Tees, Capital North East, Heart North East, Smooth North East, Greatest Hits Radio North East, Nation Radio North East, TFM; and community radio stations Durham On Air, Bishop FM in Bishop Auckland, and Darlo Radio serving Darlington.
