= Darren Grimes =

British politician (born 1993)

Councillor Darren Grimes
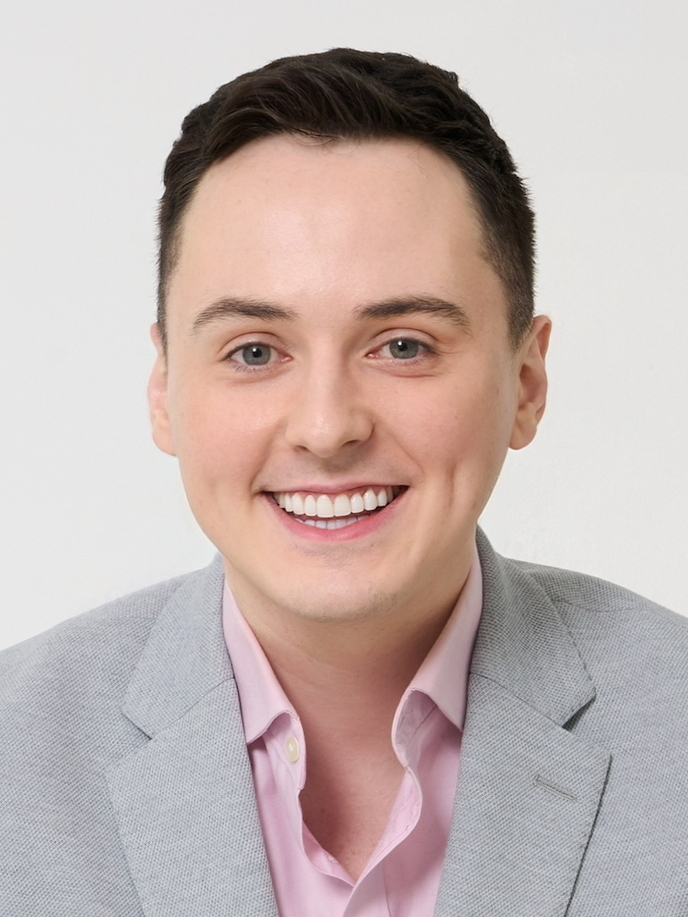
- Grimes in 2025

Deputy Leader of Durham County Council
- Incumbent
- Assumed office 14 May 2025
- Leader: Andrew Husband

Member of Durham County Council for Annfield Plain and Tanfield
- Incumbent
- Assumed office 2 May 2025
- Preceded by: Christine Bell

Member of Reform UK Governing Board
- Incumbent
- Assumed office 22 August 2025

Personal details
- Born: 22 July 1993 (age 33) Consett, County Durham, England
- Party: Reform UK (since 2025)
- Other political affiliations: Conservative (2016–2025); Liberal Democrats (until 2016)
- Education: University of Brighton
- Website: darrengrimes.com

Darren Grimes (born 22 July 1993) is a British Reform UK politician and political commentator. He worked for a number of Brexit campaigns. He set up the website Reasoned in May 2020. He currently serves as the Deputy Leader of Durham County Council and as a Reform UK councillor in Durham County Council, having been elected in the 2025 local elections. In August 2025, he was also elected to the Reform UK board with the highest number of votes.

== Personal life ==
Grimes grew up in a single-parent household in Consett, County Durham, England. He studied fashion and business studies at the University of Brighton but did not complete his degree. He is gay.

== Activism ==
While at university, Grimes was an activist for the Liberal Democrats, and worked for then-MP Norman Lamb's unsuccessful 2015 party leadership campaign. In summer 2015 he was interviewed by the BBC about his admiration for former Lib Dem leader Charles Kennedy, praising Kennedy's vocal pro-EU stance and saying it could have helped the Remain side in the forthcoming referendum: "He believed that in an increasingly globalised world, having Britain in Europe was the only way forward. And I think that's the message the party needs pushing."

However, by the following year Grimes' political stance had changed and he founded the pro-Brexit group BeLeave aimed at younger voters during the 2016 United Kingdom European Union membership referendum campaign.

Grimes later dropped out of university, and between 2016 and 2018, he worked as a deputy editor for the political website BrexitCentral, founded by Matthew Elliott, the former Vote Leave chief executive. In 2018, he became the digital manager for the Institute of Economic Affairs (IEA), a free market think tank.

In 2019, he was amongst those associated with a newly launched right-wing youth organisation called Turning Point UK (TPUK), set up by Conservative Party donor and unsuccessful Brexit Party MEP candidate George Farmer. It is closely allied to Turning Point USA, a US right-wing youth movement.

In May 2020 Grimes launched Reasoned, a website aimed at those "standing against the tide" who "hide [their] political views for fear of being called heterophobic, a TERF, [or] racist". It is a rebranding of a previous conservative youth group called Reason, and is backed by the son of former Brexit Party MEP Lance Forman. According to the satirical magazine Private Eye, a video was released in 2020 by Grimes on Reasoned that appeared to be a near word-for-word copy of a video released by the US right-wing platform PragerU. Facebook adverts for the group placed in 2018 were paid for by "Your Channel Media", a company owned and run by TPUK chief executive Oliver Anisfeld.

In July 2020, an interview with the historian David Starkey that Grimes published on his video platform sparked controversy. The historian remarked that "Slavery was not genocide, otherwise there wouldn't be so many damn blacks in Africa or in Britain, would there?" This prompted criticism, including condemnation by former Chancellor of the Exchequer Sajid Javid, and Grimes tweeted that "I reject in the strongest possible terms what Dr Starkey said in that clip and so very wish I'd caught it at the time." The Metropolitan Police opened an investigation into Grimes on the suspicion of stirring up racial hatred, and requested to interview Grimes. The former director of public prosecutions Ken Macdonald called the investigation "deeply threatening of free speech", a view which was echoed by some Conservative Party MPs. The investigation concluded without any charges being brought.

== Electoral Commission case ==
In 2018, Grimes was fined £20,000 by the Electoral Commission after it determined that there was evidence that BeLeave had spent more than £675,000 with the Canadian political consultancy firm AggregateIQ in coordination with the official Brexit campaign organisation Vote Leave in distribution targeted social media advertisements. The Commission argued that these actions violated electoral spending rules, and that both Grimes and Vote Leave official David Alan Halsall had made false declarations relating to the spending. Grimes appealed, stating that his misstatements were unintentional. He won the appeal and his fine was overturned; Vote Leave, however, withdrew its appeal and paid fines totalling £61,000. Subsequently, in May 2020, the Metropolitan Police ended its investigation into Grimes and Halsall. In June 2021, the Chairman of the Electoral Commission apologised to Grimes in a Sunday Telegraph interview.

== Broadcasting ==
In January 2022, Grimes began presenting his own weekend show on GB News called Real Britain. The show was cancelled in November 2022. In April 2023 he returned to GB News, co-hosting a Saturday night show and as a stand-in for several presenters.

On 1 March 2025, Grimes left GB News to pursue a political career. He said: "I gave up a well-paid national media job because I simply couldn't stomach watching my country being run into the ground any longer – and, thanks to Ofcom rules, I couldn't do both."

Grimes returned to GB News in 2026.

== Political career ==
In the 2025 United Kingdom local elections, Grimes was elected as a Reform UK councillor for the Annfield Plain ward of Durham County council with 49.7 per cent of the vote.

On 15 May 2025, Grimes was elected as Deputy Leader of the Reform UK Group in Durham Council. The party declared they would cut wasteful spending and improve local government efficiency. By the end of 2025, the predicted deficit for the local authority had risen from £71 million to £82 million, leaving an £11m financial black hole. Grimes said the figures were "no joke" as he told a Cabinet meeting: "Though looking at the figures, I wish they hadn't bothered updating them as they make for thoroughly depressing reading."

In July 2025 it was reported that when speaking to a constituent Grimes said that the police had advised him to not hold surgeries on security concerns. A senior PCC spokesperson for Joy Allen, Durham Police and Crime Commissioner, told the constituent: "The Police have not advised councillors not to hold surgeries in the community. They would only do this in exceptional circumstances i.e. if there was a specific risk identified."

Grimes has called the European Convention on Human Rights (ECHR) "utterly bent" and said in 2024, "Leave the ECHR! Please wake up to how serious this is for democracy!".

In August 2025, Grimes posted a video to his X account of his brother on a boat trip in Scarborough alongside a number of non-white people, which included children. Grimes wrote: "My brother in Scarborough for a bank holiday weekend away. I had to ask him if he was on a dinghy to Dover, but then I realised there are women and children on board." Labour mayor Kim McGuinness accused Grimes of "inciting racism and hate". Grimes responded to the accusation by stating: "I must take issue with the Labour Party smear suggesting that my remarks were racist. The point I made was an observation about demographic change in our country. This is a question of democratic accountability and policy, not a question of racial superiority or inferiority."

In August 2025, Grimes was the subject of an official complaint to Durham County Council after posting a video that used fake AI footage of Prime Minister Keir Starmer at the helm of an asylum boat.

In February 2026, Grimes posted a blog he had written in which he said southern councils were moving "problem tenants, recent refugees and homeless families" to the region. He linked the issue to Durham's social housing waiting list. The article used a faked photo of a group of South Asian men in tracksuits next to a coach in a housing estate. Grimes acknowledged it was AI-generated. "The image was obviously for illustrative purposes," he said. The authority's Liberal Democrat opposition leader, Amanda Hopgood, said it was "nothing short of disgusting". Green Party councillors claimed it had been aimed at sowing "racial hatred".

In October 2026, Grimes was featured in the ITV documentary A Year in Reform. Grimes was covertly recorded during a media preparation session with Welsh councillor Karl Lewis, who had previously circulated controversial material online, including posts regarding Muslim migrants.
