= County Hall, Durham =

County building in Durham, County Durham, England

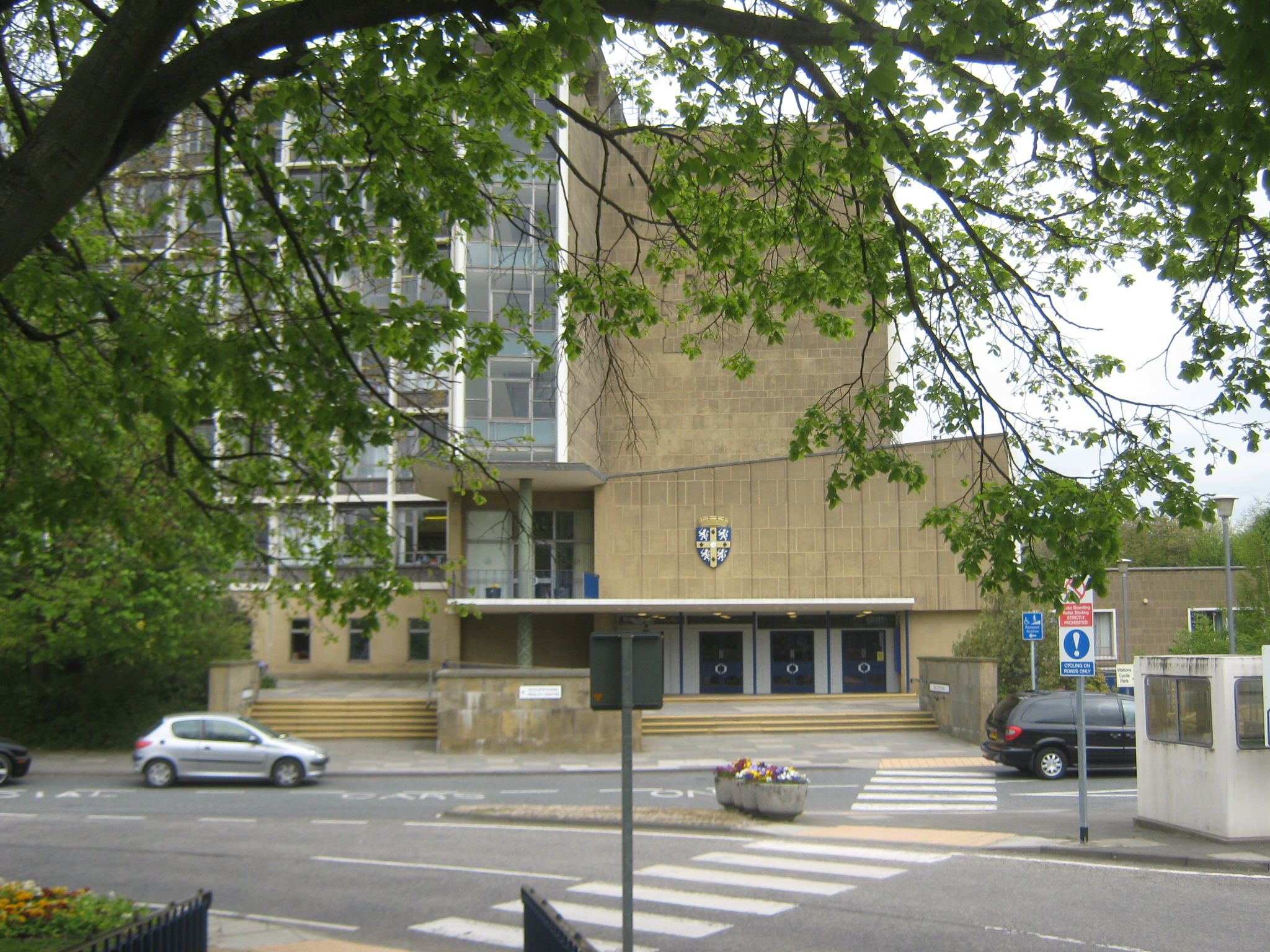
- Entrance to County Hall

- Location within County Durham

General information
- Architectural style: Brutalist style
- Location: Aykley Heads, Durham, Durham, United Kingdom
- Coordinates: 54.7859°N 1.5850°W
- Completed: 1963

Design and construction
- Architects: G. R. Clayton and G. W. Gelson

County Hall was a municipal building at Aykley Heads in Durham, County Durham, England. It was the headquarters of Durham County Council.

== History ==
=== Predecessor and construction ===
In the first half of the 20th century Durham County Council was based at the Shire Hall in Old Elvet, Durham. After deciding the Shire Hall was inadequate for their needs, county leaders chose to procure a new county headquarters: the site selected had previously been open land forming part of the Aykley Heads Estate which centred around an 18th century mansion that had been built and occupied by the Dixon-Johnson family.

Work on the new building began in 1960: it was designed by county architects G. R. Clayton and G. W. Gelson, built by John Laing & Son at a cost of £2.75 million and was officially opened by the Duke of Edinburgh on 14 October 1963. The design for the seven-storey building involved continuous bands of glazing with exposed concrete beams above and below: a large mosaic mural depicting local scenes was designed by Clayton and Gelson and installed on the face of the building. Internally, the principal room was the council chamber; a memorial to county council staff who had died in the First and Second World Wars was recovered from the Shire Hall and installed outside the new council chamber.

=== Rejected successors ===
In March 2019, the County Council approved a proposal to move to a smaller new-build facility on the Sands car park at Freeman's Place in the centre of Durham. The building works, carried out by Kier Group at a cost of £50 million, were completed in March 2022. Richard Holden, Conservative member of parliament for North-West Durham, described the new council headquarters as a 'vanity project', questioning the suitability of the location as well as tax increases and cuts to services used to pay for the development.

The Labour council leadership that ordered the new building was replaced by a Conservative-led coalition after the 2021 local elections, the decision was made to sell the new building to Durham University for £84 million as a new home for Durham University Business School and instead to build a new civic centre on the existing site in Aykley Heads, a proposal later also rejected.

=== Relocations before demolition ===
The county council announced plans in 2019 to move the county archives from County Hall to a new history centre at Mount Oswald.

Works of art in the building included a painting, 30.75 feet (9.37 m) long and 5.66 feet (1.73 m) high, by Norman Cornish, depicting a miners' gala, which was located in the entrance hall. In March 2020, it was relocated to Bishop Auckland Town Hall.

Of around 1,850 staff based at County Hall in 2020, 1,000 were to be based at the new HQ and approximately 850 were to relocate to four council office sites being developed across the county in Crook, Meadowfield, Seaham and Spennymoor.

=== Redevelopment ===
In 2019 the Council planned to demolish County Hall as part of a masterplan to redevelop the wider site at Aykley Heads as a business park with supporting retail, financial and professional, food and drink, non-residential institutions, and assembly and leisure uses, with associated landscaping, multi-storey and surface car parking. In 2023, a plan was launched to redevelop the site as part of the proposed Durham innovation district. In 2025 the council announced that they were planning to enter a joint venture with a development partner in order to carry out this redevelopment, with the aim of creating 4,000 jobs across the innovation district as a whole (also taking in the Milburngate development and Durham University Business School in the Sands) and replicating the success of NETPark in Sedgefield. It was also confirmed that County Hall would be demolished in 2026 once a council chamber and public reception area had been created in the Rivergreen building.

== Replacement ==
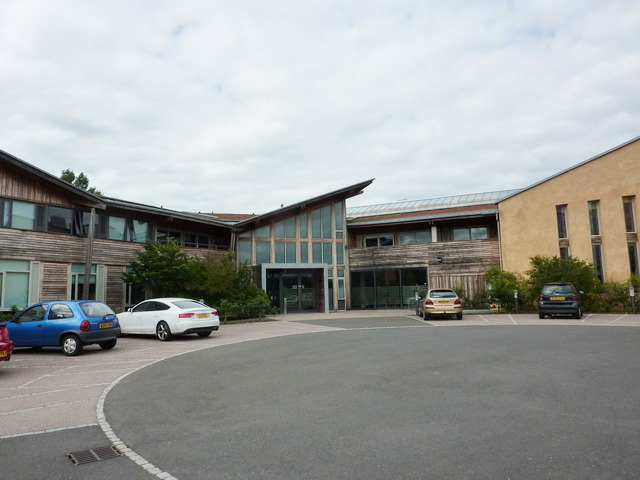
Rivergreen centre

In 2023, it was announced that plans to build a new civic centre on the current site would not go ahead and that the council now planned to buy the nearby Rivergreen building and redevelop it as a new council HQ from 2025. The building was built in 2006 and was the place where Atom Bank was founded. A new council chamber is planned for the Rivergreen building, to be in operation from 2026. Council staff are also being relocated to Corten House and Salvus House in Aykley Heads.
