= 2021 Durham County Council election =

UK local government election

- 6 May 2021

All 126 council division seats 64 seats needed for a majority
- Turnout: 36.4% (▲5.1 pp)

	First party	Second party	Third party
Party	Labour	Conservative	Independent
Last election	74 seats, 36.3%	10 seats, 20.3%	13 seats, 15.0%
Seats won	53	24	22
Seat change	▼21	▲14	▲9
Popular vote	51,769	41,465	25,653
Percentage	33.5%	26.8%	16.6%
Swing	▼2.8%	▲6.5%	▲1.6%
	Fourth party	Fifth party	Sixth party
Party	Liberal Democrats	Derwentside Independents	North East
Last election	14 seats, 13%	7 seats, 5.8%	3 seats, 2.3%
Seats won	17	5	4
Seat change	▲3	▼2	▲1
Popular vote	19,126	5,042	2,445
Percentage	12.4%	3.3%	1.6%
Swing	▲0.7%	▼2.4%	▼0.7%
	Seventh party
Party	Green
Last election	0 seats, 2.8%
Seats won	1
Seat change	▲1
Popular vote	5,842
Percentage	3.8%
Swing	▲1.0%
- Map showing the results of the 2021 Durham County Council election
Council control before election
Labour
Council control after election
Liberal Democrat led coalition

The 2021 Durham County Council election was held on 6 May 2021 as part of the 2021 local elections in the United Kingdom.

All 126 councillors were to be elected. The county is divided into 63 electoral divisions (called "wards") with each electing between 1 and 3 councillors by the first-past-the-post voting method for a fixed four-year term.

The result saw the Labour Party retain its position as the largest party but lose control of the council. It marked the first time since 1919 that the council (and its predecessors) had not been controlled by Labour.

Another notable result was the Green Party of England and Wales gaining their first seat on the Council in the Brandon division, gaining one seat from Labour.

The council convened in its Annual Meeting on 26 May, where a coalition of the Conservatives, Liberal Democrats, North East Party, and independents formed the Cabinet and elected Amanda Hopgood of the Liberal Democrats as Leader of the Council; the first woman to hold the position.

== Results summary ==
Durham County Council election, 2021
Party	Seats	Gains	Losses	Net gain/loss	Seats %	Votes %	Votes	+/−
Labour	53	2	23	-21	42.1	33.5	51,769	-2.8
Conservative	24	15	1	+14	19.0	26.8	41,465	+6.5
Independent	22	11	2	+9	17.5	16.6	25,653	+1.6
Liberal Democrats	17	3	0	+3	13.5	12.4	19,126	+0.7
Green	1	1	0	+1	0.8	3.8	5,842	+1.0
Derwentside Independents	5	1	3	-2	4.0	3.3	5,042	-2.4
North East	4	2	1	+1	3.2	1.6	2,445	-0.7
Seaham Community Party	0	0	0	-	0.0	1.1	1,645	-0.1
Political Unity for Progress	0	0	0	-	0.0	0.5	792	+0.5
For Britain	0	0	0	-	0.0	0.3	501	+0.3
Reform	0	0	0	-	0.0	0.1	114	+0.1
Freedom Alliance	0	0	0	-	0.0	0.0	40	--
Spennymoor Independents	0	0	5	-5	0.0	0.0	0	-1.4
UKIP	0	0	0	-	0.0	0.0	0	-3.2

== Results by electoral division ==
=== A − B ===
Annfield Plain
Party	Candidate	Votes	%	±%
Derwentside Independents	Joan Nicholson*	719	39.4	−8.1
Derwentside Independents	Christine Bell	521	28.5	−7.8
Conservative	Samuel Charles Oliver Simkin	518	28.4	+16.0
Conservative	Timothy Peter Waters	514	28.1	N/A
Labour	Jeanette Theresa Stephenson*	474	25.9	−18.4
Labour	Eileen McKnightsmith	409	22.4	−21.0
Independent	Ken Rollings	142	7.8	N/A
Turnout		1842	30.98	−0.42
Derwentside Independents gain from Labour		Swing	N/A	
Derwentside Independents hold		Swing	N/A	

Aycliffe East
Party	Candidate	Votes	%	±%
Liberal Democrats	Neville Jones	966	44.3	N/A
Labour	Jim Atkinson	556	25.5	−17.7
Conservative	Martin Peeke	518	23.8	+2.6
Liberal Democrats	Tony Armstrong	449	20.6	N/A
Labour	Wendy Patricia Hillary	417	19.1	−21.9
Independent	Bob Fleming	376	17.3	N/A
Independent	Brian Haigh	197	9.0	−1.9
Reform	John William Grant	114	5.2	−10.3
Turnout		2199	34.48	+8.48
Liberal Democrats gain from Labour		Swing	N/A	
Labour hold		Swing	N/A	

Aycliffe North and Middridge
Party	Candidate	Votes	%	±%
Conservative	David Sutton-Lloyd	1,269	43.4	+3.8
Liberal Democrats	Michael Stead	1,130	38.7	N/A
Conservative	Tony Stubbs	905	31.0	−7.6
Labour	John Duncan Clare	823	28.2	−11.1
Liberal Democrats	Maureen Shelton	633	21.7	N/A
Liberal Democrats	Andrea Miller	621	21.2	N/A
Labour	Kathryn Sarah Beetham	494	16.9	−17.5
Labour	Jed Hillary	474	16.2	−14.6
Independent	John Douglas Moore	462	15.8	N/A
Independent	Dorothy Bowman	447	15.3	−10.8
Independent	Sandra Haigh	197	6.7	−1.8
Turnout		2937	34.89	+7.39
Conservative hold		Swing	N/A	
Liberal Democrats gain from Labour		Swing	N/A	
Conservative hold		Swing	N/A	

Aycliffe West
Party	Candidate	Votes	%	±%
Labour	Eddy Adam*	539	35.2	−5.3
Independent	Ken Robson	439	28.7	−2.4
Labour	Kate Hopper*	434	28.3	−8.5
Independent	George Coulson Gray	354	23.1	−6.5
Conservative	Elizabeth Rosemary Maw	350	22.8	+6.5
Liberal Democrats	Paul Andrew Whiting	259	16.9	N/A
Liberal Democrats	James Robert Walsh	196	12.8	N/A
Freedom Alliance	Michaela Helen Banthorpe	40	2.6	N/A
Turnout		1555	28.83	+3.23
Labour hold		Swing	N/A	
Independent gain from Labour		Swing	N/A	

Barnard Castle East
Party	Candidate	Votes	%	±%
Conservative	George Morland Richardson*	1,689	57.3	+5.0
Conservative	James Michael Rowlandson*	1,619	54.9	−1.3
Labour	Emma Louise Rowell	780	26.4	−4.0
Labour	Chloe Sheila Walls	528	17.9	−8.2
Green	Genevieve Susan Metcalfe	362	12.3	N/A
Liberal Democrats	Christine Margaret Van Mourik	338	11.5	N/A
Turnout		2965	42.88	+5.58
Conservative hold		Swing	N/A	
Conservative hold		Swing	N/A	

Barnard Castle West
Party	Candidate	Votes	%	±%
Conservative	Richard Andrew Bell*	2,123	68.8	−7.0
Conservative	Ted Galehurst Henderson*	1,764	57.2	−7.8
Labour	Dave Hynes	739	24.0	−1.4
Labour	David Wilson Hardaker	703	22.8	+2.9
Liberal Democrats	Stephen White	271	8.8	N/A
Turnout		3096	46.87	+9.07
Conservative hold		Swing	N/A	
Conservative hold		Swing	N/A	

Belmont
Party	Candidate	Votes	%	±%
Liberal Democrats	Lesley Mavin*	1,526	36.5	−1.6
Liberal Democrats	Stuart Eric Mavin*	1,465	35.0	−6.6
Labour	Christine Anne Fletcher	1,464	35.0	−3.8
Labour	Pauline Hardman	1,357	32.5	−1.0
Liberal Democrats	Michael Watson	1,282	30.7	+0.9
Labour	Christopher Jon Ranson	1,127	27.0	−1.8
Conservative	Taylor James Downs	999	23.9	+2.1
Conservative	Joshua Wooller	858	20.5	N/A
Conservative	Michael Drummond Moverley Smith	816	19.5	N/A
Green	Roger Michael McAdam	505	12.1	+3.2
Independent	Arthur Clifford Walker	410	9.8	−8.9
Turnout		4206	41.78	+4.18
Liberal Democrats hold		Swing	N/A	
Liberal Democrats hold		Swing	N/A	
Labour hold		Swing	N/A	

Benfieldside
Party	Candidate	Votes	%	±%
Labour	Kevin Earley	1,051	37.0	+11.9
Derwentside Independents	Stephen Robinson*	904	31.8	−19.5
Derwentside Independents	Peter Oliver*	843	29.7	−15.5
Conservative	Eileen Ridley	832	29.3	+14.2
Conservative	Toby Thatcher	718	25.3	N/A
Labour	Steven John Wood	696	24.5	−3.4
Liberal Democrats	Christine English	264	9.3	−1.5
Turnout		2850	43.93	+8.63
Labour gain from Derwentside Independents		Swing	N/A	
Derwentside Independents hold		Swing	N/A	

Bishop Auckland Town
Party	Candidate	Votes	%	±%
Conservative	Andrew Jackson	1,323	53.6	+27.4
Independent	Sam Zair*	1,149	46.6	+10.2
Labour	Harley James Balmerhowieson	685	27.8	−5.9
Labour	Katie Eliot	601	24.4	−1.0
Turnout		2476	41.15	+9.25
Conservative gain from Labour		Swing	N/A	
Independent hold		Swing	N/A	

Bishop Middleham and Cornforth
Party	Candidate	Votes	%	±%
Conservative	Elaine Peeke	451	43.2	+15.8
Labour	Pauline Fernlea Crathorne	345	33.1	−12.4
Independent	Tony Douglas Brimm	247	23.7	−3.4
Turnout		1050	36.24	+9.14
Conservative gain from Labour		Swing	N/A	

Blackhalls
Party	Candidate	Votes	%	±%
Labour	Rob Crute*	1,179	58.8	−5.4
Labour	Stacey Deinal	898	44.8	−15.2
Conservative	Simon James Elund	644	32.1	+8.4
North East Party	Steven Franklin	253	12.6	−2.3
North East Party	Ebony Watson	236	11.8	−2.0
Turnout		2011	32.38	+4.18
Labour hold		Swing	N/A	
Labour hold		Swing	N/A	

Brandon
Party	Candidate	Votes	%	±%
Green	Jonathan Elmer	1,128	40.5	N/A
Labour	Paul Taylor*	1,113	39.9	−21.8
Green	Priscilla Anne Bowen Elmer	999	35.8	N/A
Labour	Anne Bonner	955	34.3	−27.0
Conservative	David Farnell Crabtree	426	15.3	−6.1
Conservative	Ethan Lewis Dodds	361	12.9	N/A
Liberal Democrats	Geoff Moore	88	3.2	−16.0
Independent	Carolyn Smith	83	3.0	N/A
Turnout		2795	36.29	+6.99
Green gain from Labour		Swing	N/A	
Labour hold		Swing	N/A	

Burnopfield and Dipton
Party	Candidate	Votes	%	±%
Labour	Mary Veronica Andrews	983	39.0	−2.8
Labour	Declan Gerard John Mulholland	860	34.1	−0.4
Conservative	David Cumming	638	25.3	+7.5
Independent	Trevor Ord	623	24.7	N/A
Conservative	Paul Douglas Robinson	585	23.2	N/A
Independent	Roland Hemsley	497	19.7	−5.4
Green	Richard Edwin Simpson	219	8.7	−2.4
Liberal Democrats	Keith English	99	3.9	N/A
Turnout		2527	40.59	+7.99
Labour hold		Swing	N/A	
Labour hold		Swing	N/A	

=== C − D ===
Chester-le-Street East
Party	Candidate	Votes	%	±%
Conservative	Beaty Bainbridge*	552	41.5	+9.0
Labour	Julie Anne Scurfield	411	30.9	+7.1
Green	Derek Morse	300	22.6	+7.7
Liberal Democrats	Neil John Bradbury	67	5.0	+1.4
Turnout		1338	45.56	+5.26
Conservative hold		Swing	N/A	

Chester-le-Street North
Party	Candidate	Votes	%	±%
Labour	Tracie Jane Smith*	695	50.1	−4.0
Independent	Ian Heaviside	445	32.1	N/A
Conservative	Anne Murphy	194	14.0	−3.7
Liberal Democrats	Philip Bernard Nathan	52	3.8	−2.9
Turnout		1394	45.93	+4.72
Labour hold		Swing	N/A	

Chester-le-Street South
Party	Candidate	Votes	%	±%
Independent	Paul Stephen Sexton*	1,619	59.4	+28.4
Independent	Bill Moist	907	33.3	+3.8
Conservative	Allan Bainbridge*	861	31.6	+1.5
Labour	Flora Conway	733	26.9	−3.0
Labour	Howell Wynne Davies	645	23.7	−4.5
Conservative	Jack Lewis Charlton	380	13.9	−11.1
Liberal Democrats	Tim Murphy	97	3.6	−5.5
Turnout		2830	47.93	+5.13
Independent hold		Swing	N/A	
Independent gain from Conservative		Swing	N/A	

Chester-le-Street West Central
Party	Candidate	Votes	%	±%
Independent	Karen Anne Fantarrow Darby	832	40.4	N/A
Labour	Simon Antony Henig*	797	38.7	−7.0
Labour	Linda Marshall*	674	32.7	−7.4
Independent	Ewan Charles Marshall	661	32.1	+7.8
Conservative	Mark Anthony Watson	369	17.9	+2.4
Conservative	Adam Martin Pollard	366	17.8	N/A
Liberal Democrats	Rowena Clair Barnard	85	4.1	N/A
Turnout		2068	35.50	+3.8
Independent gain from Labour		Swing	N/A	
Labour hold		Swing	N/A	

Chilton
Party	Candidate	Votes	%	±%
No Description	Julie Cairns	491	44.3	N/A
Conservative	Oliver Garbutt Peeke	313	28.2	−3.6
Labour Co-op	Stuart Alexander Sutherland	304	27.4	−40.7
Turnout		1123	31.89	+2.79
No Description gain from Labour		Swing	N/A	

Consett North
Party	Candidate	Votes	%	±%
Independent	Alexander Watson*	957	39.8	−2.4
Liberal Democrats	Kathryn Lesley Rooney	778	32.4	−18.0
Labour	Phillip Marshall	700	29.1	+3.3
Conservative	Nicholas Paul McCarthy	592	24.6	+16.5
Liberal Democrats	David Bowerbank	578	24.1	−2.3
Labour	Clive Dermot Sinclair Hedges	407	16.9	+0.9
Independent	Laura Rides	180	7.5	N/A
Turnout		2411	40.62	+4.02
Independent hold		Swing	N/A	
Liberal Democrats hold		Swing	N/A	

Consett South
Party	Candidate	Votes	%	±%
Liberal Democrats	Dominic John Haney	501	37.8	N/A
Conservative	Amy Dhillon	380	28.7	+13.9
Labour	Mark Ernest Appleby	322	24.3	−10.1
Derwentside Independents	Derek Hicks*	121	9.1	−41.7
Turnout		1327	34.86	+10.26
Liberal Democrats gain from Derwentside Independents		Swing	N/A	

Coundon
Party	Candidate	Votes	%	±%
Labour	Charlie Kay*	512	53.2	−7.2
Conservative	Sue Elliott	338	35.1	+17.1
Independent	Michael David Ramage	69	7.2	N/A
Liberal Democrats	Ben Oliver	43	4.5	N/A
Turnout		966	30.33	+4.53
Labour hold		Swing	N/A	

Coxhoe
Party	Candidate	Votes	%	±%
Independent	Jan Blakey*	1,702	49.8	+3.3
Independent	Gary Hutchinson	1,404	41.0	N/A
Labour	Maura Christina McKeon*	1,289	37.7	−3.0
Labour	John Stuart Dunn*	1,241	36.3	−6.5
Labour	Maria Leina Plews	1,126	32.9	−6.4
Conservative	Jason Stephen Carr	702	20.5	−6.0
Conservative	Marc Owens	695	20.3	N/A
Conservative	Harvey Jeffrey Stevens	591	17.3	N/A
Liberal Democrats	Oliver Edward Latimer	140	4.1	−15.0
Liberal Democrats	Adam Joseph Walker	140	4.1	−7.2
Turnout		3436	34.60	+4.7
Independent hold		Swing	N/A	
Independent gain from Labour		Swing	N/A	
Labour hold		Swing	N/A	

Craghead and South Moor
Party	Candidate	Votes	%	±%
Labour	Carole Ann Hampson*	873	51.0	−2.4
Labour	Sam McMahon	798	46.6	−9.6
Derwentside Independents	Katy Coulsdon	518	30.3	+6.2
Conservative	Anthony Vivian Bently	330	19.3	+7.1
Conservative	Ian James Goodwin	326	19.1	N/A
Turnout		1720	29.41	+0.61
Labour hold		Swing	N/A	
Labour hold		Swing	N/A	

Crook
Party	Candidate	Votes	%	±%
Conservative	James Michael Currah	1,323	41.1	+10.7
Conservative	Patricia Ann Jopling*	1,317	40.9	+0.9
Independent	Anne Reed*	1,259	39.1	−9.4
Conservative	Robbie Rodiss	1,185	36.8	N/A
Labour	Andrea Jean Patterson*	1,137	35.3	−0.5
Labour	Mary Elizabeth Hall	887	27.5	−7.5
Labour	Maureen Blanche Stanton	778	24.2	−1.9
Turnout		3232	34.90	+6.9
Conservative gain from Labour		Swing	N/A	
Conservative gain from Independent		Swing	N/A	
Independent hold		Swing	N/A	

Dawdon
Party	Candidate	Votes	%	±%
Labour	Kevin Joseph Shaw*	1,043	51.8	+1.1
Labour	Leanne Kennedy*	1,035	51.4	+4.9
Seaham Community Party	Robert Arthur	689	34.2	−6.4
Seaham Community Party	Linda Willis	542	26.9	−2.8
Conservative	David Robert Young	333	16.5	+4.5
Turnout		2028	32.58	+3.88
Labour hold		Swing	N/A	
Labour hold		Swing	N/A	

Deerness
Party	Candidate	Votes	%	±%
Labour	Jean Kathleen Chaplow*	1,436	44.3	−9.3
Labour	Marion Wilson*	1,412	43.6	−3.3
Labour	Dan Nicholls	1,217	37.6	−14.9
Conservative	Fleur Elizabeth Meston	1,003	31.0	+8.5
Conservative	Richard Lawrie	894	27.6	N/A
Conservative	Matthew Alexander Vickers	853	26.3	N/A
Liberal Democrats	John Joseph Kelley	617	19.0	+0.5
Liberal Democrats	Florence Diana Simpsons	610	18.8	+3.8
Liberal Democrats	Katie Tucker	417	12.9	−2.0
Green	Alan Ostle	317	9.8	−5.4
Turnout		3257	34.24	+2.94
Labour hold		Swing	N/A	
Labour hold		Swing	N/A	
Labour hold		Swing	N/A	

Delves Lane
Party	Candidate	Votes	%	±%
Conservative	Angela Sterling	1,026	47.0	+19.1
Conservative	Michelle Walton	988	45.3	N/A
Labour	Jane Brown*	824	37.8	−8.9
Labour	Malcolm Clarke*	817	37.5	−10.5
Derwentside Independents	George James Robert McKay	222	10.2	−30.3
Liberal Democrats	Nathan Stephen Haney	89	4.1	N/A
Turnout		2187	34.95	+8.65
Conservative gain from Labour		Swing	N/A	
Conservative gain from Labour		Swing	N/A	

Deneside
Party	Candidate	Votes	%	±%
Labour	Rochelle Charlton-Lainé	664	46.9	−6.5
Labour	John James Purvis	654	46.2	−3.0
Seaham Community Party	Susan Mary Faulkner	475	33.5	+3.8
Seaham Community Party	Barry Taylor	464	32.8	+1.1
Conservative	Clive Michael Parker	299	21.1	+9.3
Turnout		1419	26.40	−0.3
Labour hold		Swing	N/A	
Labour hold		Swing	N/A	

Durham South
Party	Candidate	Votes	%	±%
Liberal Democrats	David Stoker*	392	40.0	−6.6
Labour	Rebecca Ahsby	317	32.3	+2.5
Conservative	Sean Patrick Healy	172	17.6	−6.0
Green	Stephen James Ashfield	99	10.1	N/A
Turnout		987	45.91	+2.61
Liberal Democrats hold		Swing	N/A	

=== E − N ===
Easington
Party	Candidate	Votes	%	±%
Labour	Angela Surtees*	952	55.7	−4.5
Labour	David John Boyes*	911	53.3	−3.5
Conservative	Graeme Hynds	468	27.4	+6.8
Conservative	Rachel Teresa Southall	327	19.1	N/A
Independent	Terry Murray	264	15.4	−11.3
North East Party	Alan Thomas Wilkinson	170	9.9	−5.8
Turnout				
Labour hold		Swing	N/A	
Labour hold		Swing	N/A	

Elvet and Gilesgate
Party	Candidate	Votes	%	±%
Liberal Democrats	David Robert Freeman*	870	46.4	−15.4
Liberal Democrats	Richard Daniel Ormerod*	864	46.1	−16.9
Labour	Victoria Rose Ashfield	672	35.8	+12.9
Labour	Omide Deinali	565	30.1	+10.7
Green	Anna Mary Marshal	361	19.3	+9.1
Conservative	Catriona Hawkes	168	9.0	−0.6
Conservative	Michael Matthew Mollon	158	8.4	−0.7
Turnout				
Liberal Democrats hold		Swing	N/A	
Liberal Democrats hold		Swing	N/A	

Esh and Witton Gilbert
Party	Candidate	Votes	%	±%
Liberal Democrats	Bev Coult*	1,406	55.6	+2.4
Liberal Democrats	Arnie Simpson*	1,247	49.3	−7.8
Labour	Alison Mary Hiles	537	21.2	−7.3
Labour	Andy Walker	462	18.3	−9.6
Conservative	Alison Hirst	383	15.2	−2.3
Conservative	David Robert Milner	374	14.8	N/A
Green	Ruth Clementine Blanchflower	176	7.0	N/A
Independent	Ryan Lee Pescod Drion	85	3.4	N/A
Green	Ian Edward Stone	83	3.3	N/A
Turnout				
Liberal Democrats hold		Swing	N/A	
Liberal Democrats hold		Swing	N/A	

Evenwood
Party	Candidate	Votes	%	±%
Conservative	James Cosslet	1,316	55.2	+13.1
Conservative	Robert Potts	1,019	42.7	+7.0
Labour	Samuel Jonathan Rushworth	768	32.2	−13.8
Labour	Julie Carolyn Ward	739	31.0	−5.3
Independent	Alan John Breeze	367	15.4	−0.5
Turnout				
Conservative hold		Swing	N/A	
Conservative gain from Labour		Swing	N/A	

Ferryhill
Party	Candidate	Votes	%	±%
Independent	Brian Francis Avery*	1,189	43.2	−4.1
Labour	Peter Bernard Atkinson*	1,130	41.1	+7.3
Conservative	Joe Michael Quinn	916	33.3	+17.9
Labour	Carole Atkinson	902	32.8	+2.1
Independent	Joe Makepeace*	893	32.5	−2.5
Labour	Curtis Ferenc Bihari	849	30.9	+0.6
Independent	David Farry	608	22.1	−9.0
Turnout				
Labour hold		Swing	N/A	
Independent hold		Swing	N/A	
Conservative gain from Independent		Swing	N/A	

Framwellgate and Newton Hall
Party	Candidate	Votes	%	±%
Liberal Democrats	Amanda Jayne Hopgood*	2,591	55.9	−3.7
Liberal Democrats	Mark Ashley Wilkes*	2,249	48.5	−10.3
Liberal Democrats	Frances Mamie Simmons*	2,096	45.2	−9.4
Labour	Ben Graham	1,065	23.0	+1.7
Labour	Jeanie Kellett	1,011	21.8	+3.4
Labour	John Hardman	970	20.9	+4.5
Conservative	Joshua James Grew	750	16.2	−0.4
Conservative	William Halford	732	15.8	+0.1
Conservative	Mark Smedley	705	15.2	N/A
Independent	Karon Willis	521	11.2	N/A
Green	Irene Ostle	417	9.0	+2.5
Turnout				
Liberal Democrats hold		Swing	N/A	
Liberal Democrats hold		Swing	N/A	
Liberal Democrats hold		Swing	N/A	

Horden
Party	Candidate	Votes	%	±%
Labour	Isabella Roberts	862	57.1	+13.5
Labour	Ian McLean*	855	56.7	+8.3
North East Party	Mary Alison Cartwright	394	26.1	−3.8
North East Party	Kirsty Louise Wilkinson	252	16.7	−0.5
Conservative	Carroll Mae Herd	233	15.5	+9.9
Turnout				
Labour hold		Swing	N/A	
Labour hold		Swing	N/A	

Lanchester
Party	Candidate	Votes	%	±%
Conservative	Douglas Oliver	1,317	43.8	+20.0
Conservative	Michael McGaun	1,242	41.3	N/A
Labour	Alison Louise Gray	1,128	37.5	−5.3
Labour	David Toner	777	25.8	−4.0
Independent	David Smith	430	14.3	N/A
Derwentside Independents	Margaret Denise Bullivant	298	9.9	−19.4
Green	Hannah Elizabeth Parker-Fuller	236	7.8	N/A
Liberal Democrats	Jeanette Williams	208	6.9	−4.2
Turnout				
Conservative gain from Labour		Swing	N/A	
Conservative gain from Labour		Swing	N/A	

Leadgate and Medomsley
Party	Candidate	Votes	%	±%
Independent	Watts Stelling*	1,227	44.8	−13.9
Derwentside Independents	Alan Shield*	1,064	38.9	−13.6
Conservative	Deborah Anne Armstrong	735	26.8	+13.2
Labour	Chris Robinson	654	23.9	−6.2
Labour	Thomas Robert Bedson	612	22.4	−2.2
Conservative	Emma Young	609	22.2	N/A
Turnout				
Independent gain from Derwentside Independents		Swing	N/A	
Derwentside Independents hold		Swing	N/A	

Lumley
Party	Candidate	Votes	%	±%
Independent	Alan Bell*	1,509	56.4	+3.6
Independent	Philip Heaviside	788	29.5	N/A
Liberal Democrats	David Alan Haswell	610	22.8	N/A
Liberal Democrats	Michael Keith Peacock	539	20.2	N/A
Labour	David Robinson	510	19.1	−6.5
Conservative	Nathan Brown	263	9.8	−6.8
Independent	Michelle Clare Melvin	245	9.2	N/A
Independent	Audrey Willis*	218	8.2	−32.1
Conservative	Jak Hocking	180	6.7	N/A
Turnout				
Independent hold		Swing	N/A	
Independent gain from Independent		Swing	N/A	

Murton
Party	Candidate	Votes	%	±%
Labour	Julie Ann Griffiths	1,200	63.0	+9.6
Labour	Robert Adcock-Forster	1,006	52.8	+7.4
Independent	Brian Brown	413	21.7	+1.6
Independent	Stephen George Robson	399	21.0	+3.6
Conservative	Andrew John Dixon	274	14.4	+3.8
Turnout				
Labour hold		Swing	N/A	
Labour hold		Swing	N/A	

Neville's Cross
Party	Candidate	Votes	%	±%
Liberal Democrats	Liz Brown*	1,686	52.4	+8.4
Liberal Democrats	Elizabeth Elton Scott *	1,420	44.2	+5.2
Labour	Brian Andrew Freeman	867	27.0	+16.9
Labour	John Alexander Turnbull	694	21.6	+11.6
Green	Natalie Selene Broughton	690	21.5	−14.5
Conservative	Frederick Robin Arthur Fawcett	440	13.7	+0.9
Conservative	Tristan Clemens Johannes Pahl	424	13.2	+1.8
Turnout				
Liberal Democrats hold		Swing	N/A	
Liberal Democrats hold		Swing	N/A	

North Lodge
Party	Candidate	Votes	%	±%
Liberal Democrats	Craig Martin*	1,070	63.4	+11.1
Labour	Michael Martin	266	15.8	+8.1
Conservative	Andrew John Husband	185	11.0	+3.7
Independent	Michael Goulding	167	9.9	N/A
Turnout				
Liberal Democrats hold		Swing	N/A	

=== P − S ===
Passfield
Party	Candidate	Votes	%	±%
North East Party	Karen Hawley*	446	41.6	+7.6
Labour	Archibald Scott Henderson Meikle	343	32.0	+11.7
Conservative	Danielle Hocking	283	26.4	+10.6
Turnout		1080	31.72	+3.32
North East Party hold		Swing	N/A	

Pelton
Party	Candidate	Votes	%	±%
Labour	Alison Joan Batey*	1,993	58.3	−4.4
Labour	Danny Wood*	1,725	50.5	+3.9
Labour	Paul Pringle	1,566	45.8	−2.8
Conservative	Michael James Botterill	1,062	31.1	−2.9
Conservative	Julie Ann Watson	735	21.5	N/A
Conservative	Adele Taggart	719	21.0	N/A
Independent	Clare Helen Todd	711	20.8	N/A
Liberal Democrats	Russell Amor Haswell	273	8.0	N/A
Turnout		3422	33.67	+4.27
Labour hold		Swing	N/A	
Labour hold		Swing	N/A	
Labour hold		Swing	N/A	

Peterlee East
Party	Candidate	Votes	%	±%
North East Party	Terry Duffy	612	45.7	+2.6
North East Party	Diane Howarth	573	42.8	+1.0
Labour	Audrey Ellen Laing*	523	39.1	−7.0
Labour	Colin Watkins	411	30.7	−14.0
Conservative	Judith May Webb	159	11.9	+1.7
Conservative	Anthony Gavaghan	154	11.5	N/A
Turnout		1350	24.82	+1.52
North East Party gain from Labour		Swing	N/A	
North East Party gain from Labour		Swing	N/A	

Peterlee West
Party	Candidate	Votes	%	±%
North East Party	Susan McDonnell*	570	36.5	−13.1
Labour	Louise Fenwick	560	35.8	−6.2
Labour	Michelle Louise McCue	493	31.5	−5.5
North East Party	Karon Liddell*	441	28.2	−14.6
No Description	Margaret Smith Hotham	220	14.1	N/A
Conservative	Samuel James Stephen Meston	206	13.2	−1.0
Conservative	John Angus Inglis Jones Kincaid	198	12.7	N/A
No Description	Jimmy Alvey	157	10.0	−32.0
Turnout		1575	25.99	+1.99
North East Party hold		Swing	N/A	
Labour gain from North East Party		Swing	N/A	

Sacriston
Party	Candidate	Votes	%	±%
Labour	Emma Waldock	922	53.4	−8.2
Labour	Simon Joseph Wilson	884	51.2	−6.7
Conservative	Graham Drummond-Hill	502	29.1	+4.6
Conservative	John Matthew Stephenson	477	27.6	N/A
Green	Nicholas Kasch	151	8.7	N/A
Liberal Democrats	Nicola Brown	136	7.9	N/A
Turnout		1735	30.57	+0.57
Labour hold		Swing	N/A	
Labour hold		Swing	N/A	

Seaham
Party	Candidate	Votes	%	±%
Labour	Karan Elizabeth Batey	722	39.6	+0.4
Labour	David McKenna	719	39.4	+2.0
Conservative	Margaret Reid	509	27.9	+3.0
Seaham Community Party	Kathryn Brace	481	26.4	−0.7
Seaham Community Party	Graeme Neville Hepworth	440	24.1	−5.0
Conservative	Emily Rought	372	20.4	−8.5
Liberal Democrats	Roger François Vila	100	5.5	N/A
Turnout		1836	34.45	+4.35
Labour hold		Swing	N/A	
Labour hold		Swing	N/A	

Sedgefield
Party	Candidate	Votes	%	±%
Conservative	David Ralph Brown*	1,084	42.8	+5.2
Independent	Chris Lines	1,042	41.2	N/A
Labour	John Robinson*	928	36.7	−0.1
Conservative	Catherine Anne Hart	787	31.1	+17.6
Labour	Heidi Louise Smith	512	20.2	−13.5
Independent	David Peter McNee	255	10.1	N/A
Turnout		2538	39.36	+10.76
Conservative hold		Swing	N/A	
Independent gain from Labour		Swing	N/A	

Sherburn
Party	Candidate	Votes	%	±%
Labour	David Marshall Hall*	1,312	54.7	−2.3
Labour	Bill Kellett*	1,218	50.8	−2.4
Conservative	Peter Stephen Bryne	745	31.1	+4.7
Conservative	Gillian Dawn Warby	710	29.6	N/A
Liberal Democrats	Michael Anderson	265	11.1	−11.7
Liberal Democrats	Andrew Neil Tibbs	194	8.1	−9.7
Turnout		2410	35.91	+6.01
Labour hold		Swing	N/A	
Labour hold		Swing	N/A	

Shildon and Dene Valley
Party	Candidate	Votes	%	±%
Labour	Shirley Quinn*	1,159	37.2	−0.4
Labour	Samantha Townsend	1,103	35.4	−7.7
Labour	Matt Johnson	1,001	32.1	−9.4
Conservative	Michael Cox	955	30.6	+9.0
Conservative	Stephen David Martin	811	26.0	N/A
Conservative	Khwan Martin	765	24.5	N/A
Independent	Robert Ingledew	701	22.5	−7.4
Independent	Luan Deakin	594	19.0	N/A
Independent	Fred Langley	498	16.0	N/A
Liberal Democrats	Nick Halliday	473	15.2	−14.8
Turnout		3136	31.19	+2.39
Labour hold		Swing	N/A	
Labour hold		Swing	N/A	
Labour hold		Swing	N/A	

Shotton and South Hetton
Party	Candidate	Votes	%	±%
Independent	Ivan Cochrane*	1,084	54.4	+8.7
Independent	Christopher Ross Hood	840	42.1	+7.2
Labour	Kylie Austin Young	593	29.8	−11.9
Labour	Alan Liversidge	471	23.6	−15.7
Conservative	Ian Richard Davenport	315	15.8	+0.6
Conservative	Clive Yarwood	257	12.9	N/A
Liberal Democrats	Andrew Thomas Carey	93	4.7	−1.1
Turnout		2005	29.49	+2.79
Independent hold		Swing	N/A	
Independent gain from Labour		Swing	N/A	

Spennymoor
Party	Candidate	Votes	%	±%
Independent	Liz Maddison*	1,029	34.0	+5.1
Independent	Pete Molloy	930	30.7	N/A
Conservative	Luke Allan Holmes	749	24.8	+13.1
Labour	Colin Nelson	636	21.0	−3.1
Conservative	Helen Louise Hannar	612	20.2	+9.5
Conservative	Lyndsey Johnson	611	20.2	N/A
Liberal Democrats	Dean Ranyard	582	19.2	+2.5
Liberal Democrats	Martin Thomas Brian Jones	461	15.2	−11.4
Labour	Kester Noble	429	14.2	−6.6
Labour	Julie Michelle Stirk	421	13.9	−2.8
Political Unity for Progress	Neville Dart	388	12.8	N/A
Political Unity for Progress	Steven Alan Jones	386	12.8	−8.0
Political Unity for Progress	Kaye Roberts	334	11.0	N/A
Green	Mark James Quinn	239	7.9	+3.7
Turnout		3053	34.71	−1.49
Independent gain from Spennymoor Independents		Swing	N/A	
Independent gain from Spennymoor Independents		Swing	N/A	
Conservative gain from Spennymoor Independents		Swing	N/A	

Stanley
Party	Candidate	Votes	%	±%
Labour	Angela Hanson	883	51.1	−4.2
Labour	Carl Marshall*	849	49.1	−6.5
Conservative	Gary McCallum	432	25.0	+10.0
Derwentside Independents	Stewart Trevor Robshaw	305	17.6	−12.2
Derwentside Independents	Janet Elizabeth Atkinson	286	16.5	−9.8
Green	Maura Theresa Radford	130	7.5	N/A
Liberal Democrats	Jennifer Ann Robertson	89	5.1	N/A
Turnout		1749	28.27	+1.77
Labour hold		Swing	N/A	
Labour hold		Swing	N/A	

=== T − W ===
Tanfield
Party	Candidate	Votes	%	±%
Labour	Gordon Binney	893	41.2	+1.0
Derwentside Independents	Joyce Charlton*	891	41.2	−5.5
Labour	Dawn Knight	818	37.8	−2.4
Derwentside Independents	David Tully	609	28.1	−10.4
Conservative	Anita Dawn Meston	345	15.9	+2.1
Conservative	Patricia Wynne	321	14.8	N/A
Turnout		2179	33.78	+3.38
Labour hold		Swing	N/A	
Derwentside Independents hold		Swing	N/A	

Tow Law
Party	Candidate	Votes	%	±%
Labour	Richard James Manchester*	583	55.7	+9.0
No Description	Terry Batson	464	44.3	N/A
Turnout		1063	30.93	+3.13
Labour hold		Swing	N/A	

Trimdon and Thornley
Party	Candidate	Votes	%	±%
Labour Co-op	Lucy Hovvels*	1,399	53.9	−5.0
Labour Co-op	Jake Miller	1,178	45.4	−12.7
Labour Co-op	Chris Varty	1,009	38.9	−18.3
Conservative	Gemma Louise Abley	823	31.7	+9.3
Conservative	William Walker	731	28.2	N/A
For Britain	Dave Smith	501	19.3	N/A
Liberal Democrats	Kenneth George Grainger	347	13.4	+1.3
Turnout		2601	26.74	+1.74
Labour hold		Swing	N/A	
Labour hold		Swing	N/A	
Labour hold		Swing	N/A	

Tudhoe
Party	Candidate	Votes	%	±%
Conservative	Mark Antony Abley	896	37.6	+20.5
Independent	Billy McAloon	766	32.1	+2.5
Labour	Andrew Clark Anderson	635	26.6	−3.8
Labour	Neil Crowther Foster	539	22.6	−6.5
Independent	Clive Maddison	482	20.2	N/A
Political Unity for Progress	Ian Geldard	404	17.0	N/A
Liberal Democrats	Beckie Calder	191	8.0	N/A
Green	Jonathan Miles-Watson	138	5.8	N/A
Turnout		2415	34.16	+0.46
Conservative gain from Spennymoor Independents		Swing	N/A	
Independent gain from Spennymoor Independents		Swing	N/A	

Weardale
Party	Candidate	Votes	%	±%
Independent	John Shuttleworth*	1,627	45.2	−18.6
Independent	Mary Anita Savory*	1,394	38.7	−19.0
Conservative	William Wearmouth	1,311	36.4	+19.8
Conservative	Charles Stephen Cowie	953	26.5	N/A
Labour Co-op	Owain Guy Richard Gardner	785	21.8	+4.7
Turnout		3609	55.10	+9.5
Independent hold		Swing	N/A	
Independent hold		Swing	N/A	

West Auckland
Party	Candidate	Votes	%	±%
Labour	Rob Yorke*	1,023	42.0	−7.5
Conservative	Mark Robert Idwal Roberts	993	40.8	+5.0
Conservative	Declan John Gilroy	921	37.8	+15.8
Labour	Helen Catherine Goodman	731	30.0	−16.5
Independent	Nick Brown	302	12.4	N/A
Independent	Lesley Gywneth Zair	248	10.2	N/A
Independent	Alex Tighe	163	6.7	−8.9
Turnout		2443	36.99	+11.79
Labour hold		Swing	N/A	
Conservative gain from Labour		Swing	N/A	

Willington and Hunwick
Party	Candidate	Votes	%	±%
Labour	Olwyn Elizabeth Gunn*	1,239	46.6	−11.3
Labour	Fraser Paul Tinsley*	1,218	45.8	−13.0
Conservative	Ian Hirst	1,209	45.5	+11.4
Conservative	Alistair Layfield	1,137	42.8	N/A
Turnout		2673	38.86	+11.76
Labour hold		Swing	N/A	
Labour hold		Swing	N/A	

Wingate
Party	Candidate	Votes	%	±%
Labour	John Robert Higgins*	630	69.8	−3.9
Conservative	Danny Bannon	227	25.2	+11.6
Liberal Democrats	Edwin Herbert Simpson	45	5.0	+2.3
Turnout		906	28.85	+2.85
Labour hold		Swing	N/A	

Woodhouse Close
Party	Candidate	Votes	%	±%
Conservative	Joanne Marie Howey	645	38.1	+7.3
Conservative	Cathy Hunt	621	36.7	N/A
Labour	John Lethbridge*	609	36.0	−23.4
Labour	Jamie Blackburn	578	34.2	−12.0
Liberal Democrats	Tanya Tucker*	289	17.1	−29.1
Independent	Leanda Chappell	230	13.6	N/A
Turnout		1712	28.44	+7.54
Conservative gain from Labour		Swing	N/A	
Conservative gain from Labour		Swing	N/A	

== Changes 2021–2025 ==
The council held six by-elections between the 2021 and 2025 elections (see By-elections below). In addition, several councillors changed party affiliation without a seat being contested:

- May 2022: Karen Hawley and Diane Howarth (North East) leave party to sit as independents
- 24 May 2024: Michael McGaun (Conservative) leaves party to sit as an independent
- June 2024: Angela Hanson and Sam McMahon (Labour) leave party to sit as independents
- November 2024: Neville Jones (Liberal Democrats) leaves party to sit as an independent
- December 2024: Robert Potts (Conservative) joins Reform UK
- January 2025: Joanne Howey and Cathy Hunt (Conservative) leave party to sit as independents; Paul Taylor (Labour) leaves party to sit as an independent
- February 2025: Fraser Tinsley (Labour) resigns – the seat was left vacant until the 2025 election; Joe Quinn (Conservative) and Cathy Hunt (independent) join Reform UK
- March 2025: Michael McGaun (independent) joins Reform UK; Stephen Robinson (Derwentside Independents) leaves party to sit as an independent
- April 2025: Mamie Simmons (Liberal Democrats) dies – the seat was left vacant until the election.

=== By-elections ===
==== Ferryhill ====
Ferryhill: 24 February 2022
Party	Candidate	Votes	%	±%
Labour	Curtis Bihari	876	41.3	+3.2
Independent	Glenys Newby	528	24.9	N/A
Conservative	David Farry	348	16.4	N/A
Independent	Joseph Makepeace	166	7.8	−81.4
Green	Rebecca Dixon-McWaters	165	7.8	N/A
Freedom Alliance	Kaela Banthorpe	28	1.3	N/A
Liberal Democrats	Bill Thorkildsen	8	0.4	N/A
Majority		348	39.7	
Turnout		2120	26.2	▼7.6
Labour gain from Independent		Swing	▲10.4	

The by-election was triggered by the death of Independent Cllr Brian Avery in October 2021, who represented the ward since the 2013 elections, having been previously elected to represent Chilton as a Labour candidate in 2008.

Conservative candidate David Farry last contested the ward as an independent candidate in 2017, having previously been elected a councillor for the ward in 2008 but defeated in 2013 as a F.A.I.R. candidate. Independent Joe Makepeace represented the ward from 2017 until 2021, when he failed to be re-elected to his seat.

==== West Auckland ====
West Auckland: 14 April 2022
Party	Candidate	Votes	%	±%
Labour	George Smith	956	56.3	+16.5
Conservative	Lyndsey Fox	554	32.6	−6.1
Independent	Nicholas Brown	187	11.0	−0.7
Majority		402	23.7	
Turnout		1,701	25.7	
Labour gain from Conservative		Swing	▲11.3	

The by-election was held following the death of Conservative councillor Mark Roberts in January 2022. Labour's George Smith gained the seat from the Conservatives.

==== Chester-le-Street East ====
Chester-le-Street East: 4 May 2023
Party	Candidate	Votes	%	±%
Labour	Julie Scurfield	716	59.5	
Conservative	Alan Bainbridge	439	36.5	
Liberal Democrats	Russell Haswell	43	3.6	
Majority		277	23.0	
Turnout		1,204	41.5	
Labour gain from Conservative		Swing	▲	

The by-election was held following the death of Conservative councillor Beatrice "Beaty" Bainbridge, who was serving as Chair of Durham County Council, in February 2023. Labour's Julie Scurfield gained the seat from the Conservatives.

==== Dawdon ====
Dawdon: 30 November 2023
Party	Candidate	Votes	%	±%
Labour	June Watson	514	55.9	+5.4
Independent	Bob Arthur	339	36.9	N/A
Conservative	Josh Rayner	56	6.1	–10.0
Liberal Democrats	Roger Vila	10	1.1	N/A
Majority		175	19.0	
Turnout		920	15.2	
Registered electors		6,062		
Labour hold				

The by-election was held following the death of Labour councillor Leanne Kennedy, a former Mayor of Seaham, in September 2023. Labour held the seat with June Watson.

==== Horden ====
Horden by-election, 2 May 2024
Party	Candidate	Votes	%	±%
Labour	June Clark	852	76.2	
North East	Robert Fishwick	180	16.1	
Conservative	George Carter	66	5.9	
Liberal Democrats	Neil Thompson	20	1.8	
Majority		672	60.1	
Turnout		1,132	21.9	
Labour hold				

The Horden by-election was triggered by the death of Labour councillor Isabella Roberts.

==== Coxhoe ====
Coxhoe: 4 July 2024
Party	Candidate	Votes	%	±%
Labour	Vivienne Anderson	2,479	42.6	
Independent	Jamie Peterson	1,257	21.6	
Independent	John Dunn	938	16.1	
Conservative	Oliver Peeke	705	12.1	
Liberal Democrats	Martin Jones	318	5.5	
Majority		1,222	21.0	
Turnout		5,819	55.75	
Registered electors		10,437		
Labour hold				

The by-election was held following the resignation of Labour councillor Maura McKeon in May 2024. Labour held the seat with Vivienne Anderson.
