= 2005 Durham County Council election =

2005 UK local government election

Results by electoral division. Key: Conservative Labour Liberal Democrat Independent Derwentside Independents

Elections to Durham County Council took place on 5 May 2005, as part of the 2005 local elections in the United Kingdom. The election also took place on the same day as the 2005 general election. This was the council's final election before it became a unitary authority as part of changes to local government in 2009, with the first elections to the new unitary council taking place in 2008. New electoral division boundaries were introduced for this election, with 63 divisions returning one councillor each using the first past the post voting system.

Labour kept control of the council with 53 seats. The Liberal Democrats were second with five seats and the Conservatives won two seats. There were also three independents elected, including two from the Derwentside Independents group.

== Results ==
Durham County Council election, 2005
Party	Seats	Gains	Losses	Net gain/loss	Seats %	Votes %	Votes	+/−
Labour	53	N/A	N/A	N/A	84.1	56.7	124,683	N/A
Liberal Democrats	5	N/A	N/A	N/A	7.9	20.4	44,878	N/A
Conservative	2	N/A	N/A	N/A	3.2	14.7	32,358	N/A
Derwentside Independents	2	N/A	N/A	N/A	3.2	3.6	7,835	N/A
Independent	1	N/A	N/A	N/A	1.6	4.5	9,833	N/A
Socialist (GB)	0	N/A	N/A	N/A	0.0	0.1	288	N/A
BNP	0	N/A	N/A	N/A	0.0	0.1	119	N/A

== Results by electoral division ==
=== Chester-le-Street (7 seats) ===
Chester-le-Street North & East
Party	Candidate	Votes	%
Labour	Joseph Knox	1,816	47.3
Liberal Democrats	Sandra Hutchinson	799	20.8
Conservative	Beatrice Bainbridge	630	16.4
Independent	Lancelot Edward William Brown	592	15.4

Chester-le-Street South
Party	Candidate	Votes	%
Labour	Rita Greener Carr	1,946	49.3
Liberal Democrats	Russell Amor Haswell	1,254	31.8
Conservative	Amanda Jane Hall	745	18.9

Chester-le-Street West Central
Party	Candidate	Votes	%
Labour	Brian David Ebbatson	1,853	63.6
Liberal Democrats	Sean Kilkenny	682	23.4
Conservative	Philip Clive Stevens	378	12.9

Lumley
Party	Candidate	Votes	%
Labour	John Brian Walker	1,860	53.1
Liberal Democrats	Angela Mary Rae	593	16.9
Conservative	Justin Matthew Garrod	576	16.4
Independent	Audrey Willis	475	13.6

Ouston and Urpeth
Party	Candidate	Votes	%
Labour	Christine Teresa Smith	2,170	60.5
Liberal Democrats	John Leak	827	23.1
Conservative	James Norman	588	16.4

Pelton
Party	Candidate	Votes	%
Labour	James Sands Cordon	1,848	49.3
Liberal Democrats	George Herbert Gardner	698	18.6
Conservative	Frank Lumsden	655	17.5
Independent	William Laverick	545	14.5

Sacriston
Party	Candidate	Votes	%
Labour	Linda Anne Wright	1,693	66.6
Liberal Democrats	Simon James Key	499	19.6
Conservative	Mark Anthony Watson	349	13.7

=== Derwentside (11 seats) ===
Annfield Plain
Party	Candidate	Votes	%
Labour	Michele Hodgson	2,119	70.1
Liberal Democrats	Gillian Raine	623	20.6
Conservative	Julie Ann Watson	280	9.3

Benfieldside
Party	Candidate	Votes	%
Labour	John Davies	1,250	40.4
Derwentside Independents	John Joseph Healey	866	27.9
Liberal Democrats	Bruce Neilson McCaig	647	20.9
Conservative	Julia Carole Ross	330	10.7

Burnopfield and Dipton
Party	Candidate	Votes	%
Derwentside Independents	Reginald Ord	1,578	45.9
Labour	Eunice Wilkinson Turnbull	1,474	42.9
Conservative	Russell Alan Ross	385	11.2

Consett North
Party	Candidate	Votes	%
Labour	Clive Robson	2,120	61.2
Liberal Democrats	Owen Leighton Temple	947	27.4
Conservative	Kenneth Hall Wilson	395	11.4

Craghead and Southmoor
Party	Candidate	Votes	%
Labour	David Haddon Marshall	1,825	67.8
Derwentside Independents	James William Harper	450	16.7
Liberal Democrats	Denis Edwin Jackson	279	10.4
Conservative	Judith Turner	136	5.1

Delves Lane and Consett South
Party	Candidate	Votes	%
Labour	Robert Young	2,178	56.1
Derwentside Independents	Anthony Westgarth	1,389	35.8
Conservative	Ivy Wilson	316	8.1

Esh
Party	Candidate	Votes	%
Labour	Joseph Armstrong	1,463	50.9
Derwentside Independents	Wallace Joseph Tyrie	556	19.3
Liberal Democrats	Neil Robert Michael Shaw	484	16.8
Conservative	Patricia Ann Adams	374	12.9

Lanchester
Party	Candidate	Votes	%
Labour	Thomas Forster	1,508	40.4
Conservative	Peter Michael Carr	797	21.3
Derwentside Independents	Richard Young	717	19.2
Liberal Democrats	Christine English	713	19.1

Leadgate and Medomsley
Party	Candidate	Votes	%
Derwentside Independents	Watts Stelling	2,279	51.4
Labour	Eric Turner	1,663	37.5
Conservative	George Andrew Adams	495	11.2

Stanley
Party	Candidate	Votes	%
Labour	Claire Louise Vasey	2,169	69.2
Liberal Democrats	David Agutter Rolfe	628	20.0
Conservative	Jonathan Turner	220	7.0
BNP	Dean Kevin Frederick McAdam	119	3.8

Tanfield
Party	Candidate	Votes	%
Labour	Edna Hunter	2,036	60.3
Liberal Democrats	Andrew David Curtis	945	27.9
Conservative	Judith May Webb	395	11.7

=== Durham (11 seats) ===
Belmont
Party	Candidate	Votes	%
Liberal Democrats	Kenneth Holroyd	1,768	52.5
Labour	Patricia Margaret Johnston	1,256	37.3
Conservative	Darren Bean	345	10.2

Brandon
Party	Candidate	Votes	%
Labour	Ronald Clive Rodgers	2,593	61.4
Liberal Democrats	Maureen Jean Ann Smith	1,629	38.6

Coxhoe
Party	Candidate	Votes	%
Labour	Dennis Morgan	2,260	65.9
Liberal Democrats	Stephen Maurice Martin	866	25.3
Conservative	Frederick Farley	300	8.8

Deerness Valley
Party	Candidate	Votes	%
Labour	Jean Kathleen Chaplow	2,705	60.9
Liberal Democrats	Arnold Simpson	1,357	30.5
Conservative	Alistair Tebbit	381	8.6

Durham South
Party	Candidate	Votes	%
Labour	Donna Michelle Whitfield	1,526	46.8
Liberal Democrats	Isabell Lunan	1,429	43.8
Conservative	Jennifer Duncan Wakefield	306	9.4

Elvet
Party	Candidate	Votes	%
Liberal Democrats	David Robert Freeman	2,184	56.8
Labour	John Ashby	925	24.0
Conservative	Christopher John Arthur	739	19.2

Framwellgate Moor
Party	Candidate	Votes	%
Labour	Norman Donald Parker Ross	2,339	48.9
Liberal Democrats	Redvers Frederick Crooks	1,952	40.8
Conservative	Patricia Wynne	496	10.4

Gilesgate
Party	Candidate	Votes	%
Liberal Democrats	Dennis James Southwell	1,848	48.2
Labour	Peter James Thompson	1,763	45.9
Conservative	Jeremy Richard Stocker	226	5.9

Neville's Cross
Party	Candidate	Votes	%
Liberal Democrats	Nigel Martin	2,681	63.8
Labour	Jonathan George Alfred Roberts	923	21.9
Conservative	Michael Drummond Moverley Smith	601	14.3

Newton Hall
Party	Candidate	Votes	%
Liberal Democrats	Frances Marnie Simmons	2,328	53.9
Labour	Aurelia Constance Smith	1,569	36.4
Conservative	Helen Dorothy Osborn	415	9.6

Sherburn
Party	Candidate	Votes	%
Labour	Raymond Pye	2,412	53.8
Liberal Democrats	Lesley Jane King	1,690	37.7
Conservative	Michael James Fishwick	385	8.6

=== Easington (12 seats) ===
Blackhalls
Party	Candidate	Votes	%
Labour	Alan Cox	2,639	80.1
Conservative	Julia Anne Welford	655	19.9

Dawdon
Party	Candidate	Votes	%
Labour	Alan Fenwick	1,717	79.7
Conservative	Jacquelyn Butler	438	20.3

Deneside
Party	Candidate	Votes	%
Labour	Albert Nugent	1,921	74.7
Conservative	Mark Thomas Nicholson	361	14.0
Socialist (GB)	Stephen Paul Colborn	288	11.2

Easington
Party	Candidate	Votes	%
Labour	Alan Barker	2,519	79.4
Conservative	Margaret Reid	652	20.6

Horden
Party	Candidate	Votes	%
Labour	Peter Paul Stradling	2,723	88.2
Conservative	Mona Riley	366	11.8

Murton
Party	Candidate	Votes	%
Labour	John William Downie Maddison	2,510	85.2
Conservative	Christopher Edward James Butler	436	14.8

Peterlee East
Party	Candidate	Votes	%
Labour	Gordon Tennant	1,856	75.2
Independent	Leslie Reynolds	404	16.4
Conservative	Roger John Nimmo Booth	209	8.5

Peterlee West
Party	Candidate	Votes	%
Labour	Dennis Coates	2,276	85.8
Conservative	Hazel Lodge	376	14.2

Seaham
Party	Candidate	Votes	%
Labour	Ronald Meir	2,246	69.8
Conservative	Derick Dixon	971	30.2

Shotton
Party	Candidate	Votes	%
Labour	Norman Wade	2,735	83.6
Conservative	Lucille Diana Nicholson	538	16.4

Thornley
Party	Candidate	Votes	%
Labour	Morris Nicholls	2,642	89.9
Conservative	Jack Victor Seear	297	10.1

Wingate
Party	Candidate	Votes	%
Labour	Leonard O'Donnell	3,205	78.7
Conservative	Lindsay Marigold Seear	870	21.3

=== Sedgefield (11 seats) ===
Aycliffe East
Party	Candidate	Votes	%
Labour	Sarah Jane Iveson	1,836	59.6
Independent	William Maurice Blenkinsopp	890	28.9
Conservative	Geoffrey Nicholas Crass	356	11.6

Aycliffe North
Party	Candidate	Votes	%
Labour	Keith Henderson	1,859	53.3
Independent	Terence Hogan	991	28.4
Conservative	Joyce Mary Raine	636	18.2

Aycliffe West
Party	Candidate	Votes	%
Labour	George Coulson Gray	1,815	57.0
Independent	Enid Marion Paylor	956	30.0
Conservative	Patricia Margaret Waller	412	12.9

Chilton
Party	Candidate	Votes	%
Labour	George Porter	2,516	65.2
Liberal Democrats	Christine Sproat	890	23.1
Conservative	William Leslie Turner	453	11.7

Ferryhill
Party	Candidate	Votes	%
Labour	Charles Magee	2,728	66.1
Liberal Democrats	Paul Mountford	1,156	28.0
Conservative	Patricia Anne Whan	243	5.9

Sedgefield
Party	Candidate	Votes	%
Labour	John Robinson	2,196	57.6
Conservative	David Ralph Brown	1,616	42.4

Shildon East
Party	Candidate	Votes	%
Labour	Dorothy Bowman	1,968	53.0
Liberal Democrats	Gareth Michael Robinson Howe	791	21.3
Independent	Simon Joseph Brown	595	16.0
Conservative	Alan Booth	356	9.6

Shildon West
Party	Candidate	Votes	%
Labour	Vernon Chapman	1,312	42.5
Liberal Democrats	James Garry Huntington	1,310	42.5
Independent	John Mayfors Smith	337	10.9
Conservative	Marney Jane Swan	126	4.1

Spennymoor and Middlestone
Party	Candidate	Votes	%
Labour	Ernest Foster	2,413	57.4
Liberal Democrats	Kevin Thompson	1,358	32.3
Conservative	Paul Andrew Carmedy	431	10.3

Trimdon
Party	Candidate	Votes	%
Labour	Paul Trippett	2,744	76.2
Conservative	Christine Moyle	857	23.8

Tudhoe
Party	Candidate	Votes	%
Labour	Neil Crowther Foster	2,526	61.8
Liberal Democrats	Martin Thomas Brian Jones	1,041	25.5
Conservative	Matthew Miller	523	12.8

=== Teesdale (3 seats) ===
Barnard Castle East
Party	Candidate	Votes	%
Conservative	Josephine Hazel Fergus	2,423	57.5
Labour	Fred Blackwell	1,788	42.5

Barnard Castle West
Party	Candidate	Votes	%
Conservative	Richard Andrew Bell	2,155	52.1
Labour	Keith Stokeld	1,143	27.6
Independent	David Andrew Wearmouth	842	30.3

Evenwood
Party	Candidate	Votes	%
Labour	John Priestley	2,246	58.5
Conservative	George Morland Richardson	1,592	41.5

=== Wear Valley (8 seats) ===
Bishop Auckland Town
Party	Candidate	Votes	%
Labour	Kenneth Manton	1,459	41.4
Liberal Democrats	Chris Foote-Wood	1,042	29.6
Conservative	Colin Raine	666	18.9
Independent	Stephen Anthony Hare	208	5.9
Independent	Thomas Waggott	145	4.1

Coundon
Party	Candidate	Votes	%
Labour	Philip Robert Graham	1,616	59.8
Liberal Democrats	Thomas Taylor	787	29.1
Conservative	Douglas David Milne	300	11.1

Crook North and Tow Law
Party	Candidate	Votes	%
Labour	Trevor Carroll	1,553	54.2
Liberal Democrats	John Bailey	1,314	45.8

Crook South
Party	Candidate	Votes	%
Labour	Robert Pendlebury	2,194	68.9
Liberal Democrats	David English	987	31.0

Weardale
Party	Candidate	Votes	%
Independent	John Shuttleworth	2,853	67.8
Liberal Democrats	Dorothy Allan	774	18.4
Labour	Alison Mary Hiles	583	13.8

West Auckland
Party	Candidate	Votes	%
Labour	Harold Douthwaite	1,619	52.5
Liberal Democrats	John Ferguson	1,057	34.3
Conservative	Howard Bowen-Jones	407	13.2

Willington
Party	Candidate	Votes	%
Labour	Brian Leslie Myers	2,199	62.7
Liberal Democrats	Anne Maria Glynn	1,309	37.3

Woodhouse Close
Party	Candidate	Votes	%
Labour	John Lethbridge	2,119	67.7
Liberal Democrats	Winston Edward Frank Perkins	712	22.7
Conservative	Sandra J Moorhouse	299	9.6
