= 2017 Durham County Council election =

United Kingdom local election

- 4 May 2017

All 126 council division seats 64 seats needed for a majority

| | First party | Second party | Third party |
|---|---|---|---|
| Party | Labour | Liberal Democrats | Independent |
| Last election | 94 seats, 46.0% | 9 seats, 9.5% | 9 seats, 13.6% |
| Seats won | 74 | 14 | 13 |
| Seat change | ▼20 | ▲5 | ▲4 |
| Popular vote | 48,730 | 15,740 | 20,177 |
| Percentage | 36.3% | 11.7% | 15.0% |
| Swing | ▼9.7% | ▲2.2% | ▲1.4% |
| | Fourth party | Fifth party | Sixth party |
| Party | Conservative | Derwentside Independents | Spennymoor Independents |
| Last election | 4 seats, 8.7% | 8 seats, 6.4% | 1 seat, 1.2% |
| Seats won | 10 | 7 | 5 |
| Seat change | ▲6 | ▼1 | ▲4 |
| Popular vote | 27,190 | 7,670 | 1,942 |
| Percentage | 20.3% | 5.7% | 1.4% |
| Swing | ▲11.6% | ▼0.7% | ▲0.2% |
| | Seventh party |
| Party | North East |
| Last election | Did not stand |
| Seats won | 3 |
| Seat change | ▲3 |
| Popular vote | 3,146 |
| Percentage | 2.3% |
| Swing | New party |
- Map showing the results of the 2017 Durham County Council election. Results by electoral division. Key: Conservative Labour Liberal Democrat Independent North East Party Derwentside Independents Spennymoor Independents Striped divisions have mixed representation.
Council control before election
Labour
Council control after election
Labour

The 2017 Durham County Council election was held on 4 May 2017 as part of the 2017 local elections in the United Kingdom. All 126 councillors were elected from 63 electoral divisions which returned either one, two or three county councillors each by first-past-the-post voting for a four-year term of office.

The Statement of Persons Nominated was published on 5 April 2017.

== Results summary ==
Durham County Council election, 2017
| Party | Seats | Gains | Losses | Net gain/loss | Seats % | Votes % | Votes | +/− |
|---|---|---|---|---|---|---|---|---|
| Labour | 74 | | | -20 | 58.7 | 36.3 | 48,730 | -9.7 |
| Conservative | 10 | | | +6 | 7.9 | 20.3 | 27,190 | +11.6 |
| Independent | 13 | | | +4 | 10.3 | 15.0 | 20,177 | +1.4 |
| Liberal Democrats | 14 | | | +5 | 11.1 | 11.7 | 15,740 | +2.2 |
| Derwentside Independents | 7 | | | -1 | 5.6 | 5.7 | 7,670 | -0.7 |
| UKIP | 0 | | | 0 | 0.0 | 3.2 | 4,269 | -3.7 |
| Green | 0 | | | 0 | 0.0 | 2.8 | 3,696 | +1.0 |
| North East | 3 | | | +3 | 2.4 | 2.3 | 3,146 | +2.3 |
| Spennymoor Independents | 5 | | | +4 | 4.0 | 1.4 | 1,942 | +0.2 |
| Seaham Community Party | 0 | | | - | 0.0 | 1.2 | 1,643 | +1.2 |

== Results by electoral division ==
=== A − B ===
Annfield Plain (2 seats)
| Party | Candidate | Votes | % | ±% |
|---|---|---|---|---|
| Derwentside Independents | Joan Nicholson | 871 | 47.5 | +5.6 |
| Labour | Jeanette Stephenson | 812 | 44.3 | −8.7 |
| Labour | Doug Carmichael | 795 | 43.4 | −0.8 |
| Derwentside Independents | Christine Bell | 666 | 36.3 | +12.4 |
| Conservative | Nicky Fernandez | 227 | 12.4 | N/A |
| Turnout | | 1,833 | 31.4 | +1.6 |
| Derwentside Independents gain from Labour | | Swing | N/A | |
| Labour hold | | Swing | N/A | |

Aycliffe East (2 seats)
| Party | Candidate | Votes | % | ±% |
|---|---|---|---|---|
| Labour | Jim Atkinson | 707 | 43.2 | −0.3 |
| Labour | Sarah Iveson | 670 | 41.0 | −11.6 |
| Independent | Bill Blenkinsopp | 498 | 30.4 | −5.1 |
| Conservative | Christine Duffy | 347 | 21.2 | +14.1 |
| UKIP | John Grant | 254 | 15.5 | N/A |
| Independent | Brian Haigh | 179 | 10.9 | N/A |
| Green | Helen Hanks | 84 | 5.1 | N/A |
| Turnout | | 1,636 | 26.0 | +0.2 |
| Labour hold | | Swing | N/A | |
| Labour hold | | Swing | N/A | |

Aycliffe North and Middridge (3 seats)
| Party | Candidate | Votes | % | ±% |
|---|---|---|---|---|
| Conservative | Scott Durham | 868 | 39.6 | +13.7 |
| Labour | John D Clare | 863 | 39.3 | −16.1 |
| Conservative | Paul Howell | 846 | 38.6 | N/A |
| Labour | Joan Gray | 754 | 34.4 | −21.1 |
| Labour | Mike Dixon | 675 | 30.8 | −18.9 |
| Independent | Dorothy Bowman | 573 | 26.1 | N/A |
| Independent | Irene Hewitson | 279 | 12.7 | N/A |
| Independent | Paul Symons | 213 | 9.7 | N/A |
| Independent | Sandra Haigh | 187 | 8.5 | −28.6 |
| Independent | Sally Symons | 151 | 6.9 | N/A |
| Turnout | | 2,194 | 27.5 | +6.2 |
| Conservative gain from Labour | | Swing | N/A | |
| Labour hold | | Swing | N/A | |
| Conservative gain from Labour | | Swing | N/A | |

Aycliffe West (2 seats)
| Party | Candidate | Votes | % | ±% |
|---|---|---|---|---|
| Labour | Edward Adam | 570 | 40.5 | −9.5 |
| Labour | Kate Hopper | 517 | 36.8 | −17.8 |
| Independent | Ken Robson | 437 | 31.1 | N/A |
| Independent | George Gray | 416 | 29.6 | −2.3 |
| Independent | Arun Chandran | 276 | 19.6 | N/A |
| Conservative | Marney Swan | 229 | 16.3 | N/A |
| Turnout | | 1,406 | 25.6 | +3.5 |
| Labour hold | | Swing | N/A | |
| Labour hold | | Swing | N/A | |

Barnard Castle East (2 seats)
| Party | Candidate | Votes | % | ±% |
|---|---|---|---|---|
| Conservative | James Rowlandson | 1,389 | 56.2 | +3.5 |
| Conservative | George Richardson | 1,292 | 52.3 | +11.3 |
| Labour | Emma Rowell | 752 | 30.4 | +0.3 |
| Labour | Christopher Kelsey | 644 | 26.1 | −3.8 |
| Independent | Thom Robinson | 478 | 19.4 | N/A |
| Turnout | | 2,470 | 37.3 | +9.7 |
| Conservative hold | | Swing | N/A | |
| Conservative hold | | Swing | N/A | |

Barnard Castle West (2 seats)
| Party | Candidate | Votes | % | ±% |
|---|---|---|---|---|
| Conservative | Richard Bell | 1,837 | 75.8 | +9.2 |
| Conservative | Ted Henderson | 1,576 | 65.0 | +8.2 |
| Labour | Francis Roche | 616 | 25.4 | +2.9 |
| Labour | George Smith | 483 | 19.9 | +4.6 |
| Turnout | | 2,423 | 37.8 | +6.4 |
| Conservative hold | | Swing | N/A | |
| Conservative hold | | Swing | N/A | |

Belmont (3 seats)
| Party | Candidate | Votes | % | ±% |
|---|---|---|---|---|
| Liberal Democrats | Eric Mavin | 1,604 | 41.6 | +10.3 |
| Labour Co-op | Katie Corrigan | 1,497 | 38.8 | −1.9 |
| Liberal Democrats | Lesley Mavin | 1,472 | 38.1 | +10.7 |
| Labour Co-op | Paul Finley | 1,292 | 33.5 | −7.1 |
| Liberal Democrats | Stephen White | 1,149 | 29.8 | +3.4 |
| Labour Co-op | Chris Turner | 1,111 | 28.8 | −6.7 |
| Conservative | Liam Bewick | 841 | 21.8 | +14.5 |
| Independent | Arthur Walker | 720 | 18.7 | −0.6 |
| Independent | Ian Kelsey | 385 | 10.0 | N/A |
| Green | Roger McAdam | 342 | 8.9 | +1.5 |
| Turnout | | 3,859 | 37.6 | +3.3 |
| Liberal Democrats gain from Labour Co-op | | Swing | N/A | |
| Labour Co-op hold | | Swing | N/A | |
| Liberal Democrats gain from Labour Co-op | | Swing | N/A | |

Benfieldside (2 seats)
| Party | Candidate | Votes | % | ±% |
|---|---|---|---|---|
| Derwentside Independents | Stephen Robinson | 1,161 | 51.3 | −2.3 |
| Derwentside Independents | Peter Oliver | 1,023 | 45.2 | +0.2 |
| Labour | Steven Wood | 632 | 27.9 | −9.5 |
| Labour | Sylvia Peak | 567 | 25.1 | −5.6 |
| Conservative | David Kinch | 341 | 15.1 | N/A |
| Liberal Democrats | Claire English | 245 | 10.8 | −2.7 |
| Liberal Democrats | Natalie English | 191 | 8.4 | +0.2 |
| Turnout | | 2,263 | 35.3 | +3.3 |
| Derwentside Independents hold | | Swing | N/A | |
| Derwentside Independents hold | | Swing | N/A | |

Bishop Auckland Town (2 seats)
| Party | Candidate | Votes | % | ±% |
|---|---|---|---|---|
| Independent | Sam Zair | 692 | 36.4 | −15.7 |
| Labour | Joy Allen | 640 | 33.7 | −3.5 |
| Conservative | Aaron Bainbridge | 498 | 26.2 | −0.5 |
| Labour | Nigel Bryson | 483 | 25.4 | −8.0 |
| Independent | Lesley Zair | 419 | 22.1 | N/A |
| Conservative | Patricia Child | 387 | 20.4 | N/A |
| Independent | Billy Neilson | 283 | 14.9 | N/A |
| Green | Daniel Davison | 164 | 8.6 | N/A |
| Turnout | | 1,900 | 31.9 | +5.4 |
| Independent hold | | Swing | N/A | |
| Labour hold | | Swing | N/A | |

Bishop Middleham and Cornforth (1 seat)
| Party | Candidate | Votes | % | ±% |
|---|---|---|---|---|
| Labour | Pauline Crathorne | 351 | 45.5 | −36.8 |
| Conservative | David Evans | 212 | 27.4 | +9.7 |
| Independent | Deane Brett | 209 | 27.1 | N/A |
| Turnout | | 772 | 27.1 | +3.7 |
| Labour hold | | Swing | N/A | |

Blackhalls (2 seats)
| Party | Candidate | Votes | % | ±% |
|---|---|---|---|---|
| Labour | Rob Crute | 1,115 | 64.2 | +3.3 |
| Labour | Lynn Pounder | 1,041 | 60.0 | +4.6 |
| Conservative | Tom Eaton | 412 | 23.7 | N/A |
| North East | Steve Franklin | 259 | 14.9 | N/A |
| North East | Jamie Robinson | 240 | 13.8 | N/A |
| Turnout | | 1,736 | 28.2 | −0.1 |
| Labour hold | | Swing | N/A | |
| Labour hold | | Swing | N/A | |

Brandon (2 seats)
| Party | Candidate | Votes | % | ±% |
|---|---|---|---|---|
| Labour | Paul Taylor | 1,339 | 61.7 | −12.4 |
| Labour | John Turnbull | 1,331 | 61.3 | −13.4 |
| Conservative | Valerie Booth | 464 | 21.4 | +9.1 |
| Liberal Democrats | Laura Wilson | 417 | 19.2 | −2.4 |
| Liberal Democrats | Denis Jackson | 368 | 17.0 | N/A |
| Turnout | | 2,171 | 29.3 | +4.1 |
| Labour hold | | Swing | N/A | |
| Labour hold | | Swing | N/A | |

Burnopfield and Dipton (2 seats)
| Party | Candidate | Votes | % | ±% |
|---|---|---|---|---|
| Labour | Ivan Jewell | 844 | 41.8 | +5.3 |
| Labour | Joanne Carr | 698 | 34.5 | −1.1 |
| Independent | Roland Hemsley | 508 | 25.1 | +8.0 |
| Derwentside Independents | David Marrs | 478 | 23.7 | −2.8 |
| Derwentside Independents | Betty Minto | 416 | 20.6 | −18.9 |
| Conservative | Ivy Wilson | 359 | 17.8 | N/A |
| Green | Melody Sandells | 225 | 11.1 | N/A |
| Turnout | | 2,021 | 32.6 | +2.2 |
| Labour gain from Derwentside Independents | | Swing | N/A | |
| Labour hold | | Swing | N/A | |

=== C − D ===
Chester-le-Street East (1 seat)
| Party | Candidate | Votes | % | ±% |
|---|---|---|---|---|
| Conservative | Beatrice Bainbridge | 394 | 32.5 | +2.9 |
| Labour | Simon Mulligan | 289 | 23.8 | −8.4 |
| Green | Derek Morse | 181 | 14.9 | N/A |
| Independent | Paul Evans | 175 | 14.4 | N/A |
| Independent | Maureen May | 71 | 5.9 | −8.6 |
| UKIP | Stephen Rendle | 59 | 4.9 | −18.9 |
| Liberal Democrats | Russell Haswell | 43 | 3.6 | N/A |
| Turnout | | 1,212 | 40.3 | +9.5 |
| Conservative gain from Labour | | Swing | N/A | |

Chester-le-Street North (1 seat)
| Party | Candidate | Votes | % | ±% |
|---|---|---|---|---|
| Labour | Tracie Smith | 678 | 54.1 | −21.8 |
| Independent | Clare Todd | 270 | 21.5 | N/A |
| Conservative | William Middlemass | 222 | 17.7 | +4.7 |
| Liberal Democrats | Philip Nathan | 84 | 6.7 | N/A |
| Turnout | | 1,254 | 41.2 | +5.8 |
| Labour hold | | Swing | N/A | |

Chester-le-Street South (2 seats)
| Party | Candidate | Votes | % | ±% |
|---|---|---|---|---|
| Independent | Paul Sexton | 789 | 31.0 | N/A |
| Conservative | Allan Bainbridge | 766 | 30.1 | +4.3 |
| Labour | George Davidson | 762 | 29.9 | −21.2 |
| Independent | Bill Moist | 751 | 29.5 | N/A |
| Labour | Katherine Henig | 718 | 28.2 | −17.0 |
| Conservative | Daniel Mayne | 637 | 25.0 | +6.5 |
| Liberal Democrats | Liam Scanlon-Brown | 233 | 9.1 | +0.3 |
| Liberal Democrats | Michael Peacock | 185 | 7.3 | +1.7 |
| Turnout | | 2,549 | 42.8 | +9.7 |
| Independent gain from Labour Co-op | | Swing | N/A | |
| Conservative gain from Labour Co-op | | Swing | N/A | |

Chester-le-Street West Central (2 seats)
| Party | Candidate | Votes | % | ±% |
|---|---|---|---|---|
| Labour | Simon Henig | 854 | 45.7 | −24.8 |
| Labour | Linda Marshall | 749 | 40.1 | −27.7 |
| Independent | Mark Atkinson | 611 | 32.7 | N/A |
| Independent | Ewan Marshall | 454 | 24.3 | N/A |
| North East | Graham Thorp | 369 | 19.7 | N/A |
| Conservative | Michael Gossage | 289 | 15.5 | +7.3 |
| Turnout | | 1,870 | 31.7 | +4.5 |
| Labour hold | | Swing | N/A | |
| Labour hold | | Swing | N/A | |

Chilton (1 seat)
| Party | Candidate | Votes | % | ±% |
|---|---|---|---|---|
| Labour | Christine Potts | 622 | 68.1 | +2.6 |
| Conservative | John Sandles | 291 | 31.9 | +25.7 |
| Turnout | | 913 | 29.1 | −2.6 |
| Labour hold | | Swing | N/A | |

Consett North (2 seats)
| Party | Candidate | Votes | % | ±% |
|---|---|---|---|---|
| Liberal Democrats | Owen Temple | 1,089 | 50.4 | +6.6 |
| Independent | Alexander Watson | 913 | 42.2 | +6.0 |
| Liberal Democrats | Margaret Nealis | 570 | 26.4 | +3.2 |
| Labour | Kevin Earley | 557 | 25.8 | −1.4 |
| Labour | Benjamin Eckford | 345 | 16.0 | −7.6 |
| Derwentside Independents | Wendy Brown | 226 | 10.5 | −8.8 |
| Conservative | Alan Beaty | 175 | 8.1 | N/A |
| Turnout | | 2,161 | 36.6 | +2.9 |
| Liberal Democrats hold | | Swing | N/A | |
| Independent hold | | Swing | N/A | |

Consett South (1 seat)
| Party | Candidate | Votes | % | ±% |
|---|---|---|---|---|
| Derwentside Independents | Derek Hicks | 395 | 50.8 | −2.8 |
| Labour | Jack Simons | 267 | 34.4 | −12.0 |
| Conservative | Raymond Goodson | 115 | 14.8 | N/A |
| Turnout | | 777 | 24.6 | +4.8 |
| Derwentside Independents hold | | Swing | N/A | |

Coundon (1 seat)
| Party | Candidate | Votes | % | ±% |
|---|---|---|---|---|
| Labour | Charlie Kay | 489 | 60.4 | −0.2 |
| Independent | Adam Zair | 175 | 21.6 | N/A |
| Conservative | Mark Watson | 146 | 18.0 | +11.7 |
| Turnout | | 810 | 25.8 | +5.6 |
| Labour hold | | Swing | N/A | |

Coxhoe (3 seats)
| Party | Candidate | Votes | % | ±% |
|---|---|---|---|---|
| Independent | Jan Blakey | 1,325 | 46.5 | −14.5 |
| Labour | John Dunn | 1,220 | 42.8 | −29.7 |
| Labour | Maura McKeon | 1,160 | 40.7 | −20.3 |
| Labour | Maria Plews | 1,122 | 39.3 | −29.6 |
| Conservative | Anne Murphy | 757 | 26.5 | +16.0 |
| Liberal Democrats | Andrew Shuttleworth | 545 | 19.1 | +8.6 |
| Liberal Democrats | Adam Walker | 322 | 11.3 | +4.6 |
| Turnout | | 2,852 | 29.9 | +3.3 |
| Independent gain from Labour | | Swing | N/A | |
| Labour hold | | Swing | N/A | |
| Labour hold | | Swing | N/A | |

Craghead and South Moor (2 seats)
| Party | Candidate | Votes | % | ±% |
|---|---|---|---|---|
| Labour | Mark Davinson | 874 | 56.2 | −7.1 |
| Labour | Carole Hampson | 831 | 53.4 | −6.3 |
| Derwentside Independents | Katy Smith | 374 | 24.1 | −6.9 |
| UKIP | Kenneth Rollings | 221 | 14.2 | −6.1 |
| Derwentside Independents | Graeme Whitworth | 205 | 13.2 | N/A |
| Conservative | Patrick Seargeant | 190 | 12.2 | N/A |
| Liberal Democrats | Gregory Coltman | 60 | 3.9 | N/A |
| Liberal Democrats | Martin Williams | 60 | 3.9 | N/A |
| Turnout | | 1,555 | 28.8 | +2.2 |
| Labour hold | | Swing | N/A | |
| Labour hold | | Swing | N/A | |

Crook (3 seats)
| Party | Candidate | Votes | % | ±% |
|---|---|---|---|---|
| Independent | Anne Reed | 1,239 | 48.5 | N/A |
| Independent | Patricia Jopling | 1,022 | 40.0 | +18.9 |
| Labour | Andrea Patterson | 913 | 35.8 | +5.2 |
| Labour | Eddie Tomlinson | 893 | 35.0 | +3.2 |
| Conservative | Daniel Cohen | 776 | 30.4 | N/A |
| Labour | Maureen Stanton | 667 | 26.1 | −2.3 |
| Liberal Democrats | David English | 512 | 20.1 | +13.0 |
| Turnout | | 2,553 | 28.0 | +4.2 |
| Independent hold | | Swing | N/A | |
| Independent gain from Labour | | Swing | N/A | |
| Labour hold | | Swing | N/A | |

Dawdon (2 seats)
| Party | Candidate | Votes | % | ±% |
|---|---|---|---|---|
| Labour | Kevin Shaw | 886 | 50.7 | −10.3 |
| Labour | Leanne Kennedy | 812 | 46.5 | −7.9 |
| Seaham Community Party | Robert Arthur | 710 | 40.6 | −4.8 |
| Seaham Community Party | Kathryn Brace | 520 | 29.7 | N/A |
| Conservative | Ben Cooper | 209 | 12.0 | N/A |
| Green | Robert Reay | 117 | 6.7 | N/A |
| Turnout | | 1,748 | 28.7 | +2.1 |
| Labour hold | | Swing | N/A | |
| Labour hold | | Swing | N/A | |

Deerness (3 seats)
| Party | Candidate | Votes | % | ±% |
|---|---|---|---|---|
| Labour | Jean Chaplow | 1,533 | 53.6 | −6.2 |
| Labour | David Bell | 1,502 | 52.5 | −2.7 |
| Labour | Marion Wilson | 1,340 | 46.9 | −3.4 |
| Conservative | Jack Gilmore | 644 | 22.5 | +17.2 |
| Liberal Democrats | John Kelley | 529 | 18.5 | +6.2 |
| Green | Janice Wilson | 461 | 15.2 | N/A |
| Liberal Democrats | Florence Simpson | 429 | 15.0 | −6.6 |
| Liberal Democrats | Edwin Simpson | 426 | 14.9 | +2.7 |
| Green | Nicholas Kasch | 295 | 10.3 | N/A |
| Turnout | | 2,860 | 31.3 | +0.5 |
| Labour hold | | Swing | N/A | |
| Labour hold | | Swing | N/A | |
| Labour hold | | Swing | N/A | |

Delves Lane (2 seats)
| Party | Candidate | Votes | % | ±% |
|---|---|---|---|---|
| Labour | Malcolm Clarke | 798 | 48.0 | −3.3 |
| Labour | Jane Brown | 776 | 46.7 | −23.6 |
| Derwentside Independents | George McKay | 672 | 40.5 | +2.1 |
| Conservative | Wendy Smith | 464 | 27.9 | N/A |
| Turnout | | 1,661 | 26.3 | +2.4 |
| Labour hold | | Swing | N/A | |
| Labour hold | | Swing | N/A | |

Deneside (2 seats)
| Party | Candidate | Votes | % | ±% |
|---|---|---|---|---|
| Labour | Edward Bell | 777 | 53.4 | −27.7 |
| Labour | Jennifer Bell | 716 | 49.2 | −27.6 |
| Seaham Community Party | Barry Taylor | 462 | 31.7 | N/A |
| Seaham Community Party | Katie Murden | 432 | 29.7 | N/A |
| Conservative | George Jackson | 172 | 11.8 | N/A |
| North East | Arron Gilbraith | 128 | 8.8 | N/A |
| North East | Terry Duffy | 62 | 4.3 | N/A |
| Turnout | | 1,456 | 26.7 | +6.1 |
| Labour hold | | Swing | N/A | |
| Labour hold | | Swing | N/A | |

Durham South (1 seat)
| Party | Candidate | Votes | % | ±% |
|---|---|---|---|---|
| Liberal Democrats | David Stoker | 351 | 46.6 | +3.3 |
| Labour | Andrzej Olechnowicz | 225 | 29.8 | −1.2 |
| Conservative | Richard Lawrie | 178 | 23.6 | +9.1 |
| Turnout | | 754 | 43.3 | +15.4 |
| Liberal Democrats hold | | Swing | N/A | |

=== E − N ===
Easington (2 seats)
| Party | Candidate | Votes | % | ±% |
|---|---|---|---|---|
| Labour | Angela Surtees | 885 | 60.2 | −1.6 |
| Labour | David Boyes | 835 | 56.8 | −11.0 |
| Independent | Terry Murray | 392 | 26.7 | −7.7 |
| Conservative | Christine Holt | 303 | 20.6 | N/A |
| North East | Andrew Watson | 231 | 15.7 | N/A |
| Turnout | | 1,470 | 26.5 | +1.1 |
| Labour hold | | Swing | N/A | |
| Labour hold | | Swing | N/A | |

Elvet and Gilesgate (2 seats)
| Party | Candidate | Votes | % | ±% |
|---|---|---|---|---|
| Liberal Democrats | Richard Ormerod | 923 | 63.0 | +26.6 |
| Liberal Democrats | David Freeman | 905 | 61.8 | +22.7 |
| Labour | Maureen Boettcher | 335 | 22.9 | −7.9 |
| Labour | Frank Salisbury | 284 | 19.4 | −8.8 |
| Green | Jamie Penston Raja | 149 | 10.2 | −2.9 |
| Conservative | Ben Glaister | 141 | 9.6 | −3.6 |
| Conservative | Pat Wynne | 133 | 9.1 | −1.8 |
| Turnout | | 1,464 | 30.4 | +9.1 |
| Liberal Democrats hold | | Swing | N/A | |
| Liberal Democrats hold | | Swing | N/A | |

Esh and Witton Gilbert (2 seats)
| Party | Candidate | Votes | % | ±% |
|---|---|---|---|---|
| Liberal Democrats | Arnold Simpson | 1,320 | 57.1 | +23.4 |
| Liberal Democrats | Michael McGaun | 1,231 | 53.2 | +22.3 |
| Labour | Barbara Armstrong | 659 | 28.5 | −13.5 |
| Labour | Joseph Armstrong | 644 | 27.9 | −15.7 |
| Conservative | Kathryn Whittaker | 402 | 17.5 | +12.4 |
| Turnout | | 2,312 | 36.9 | +4.8 |
| Liberal Democrats gain from Labour | | Swing | N/A | |
| Liberal Democrats gain from Labour | | Swing | N/A | |

Evenwood (2 seats)
| Party | Candidate | Votes | % | ±% |
|---|---|---|---|---|
| Labour | Heather Broadbent | 847 | 46.0 | −6.2 |
| Conservative | Anthony Hugill | 775 | 42.1 | +10.4 |
| Labour | Andy Turner | 668 | 36.3 | −3. |
| Conservative | James Cosslett | 657 | 35.7 | +14. |
| UKIP | Alan Breeze | 293 | 15.9 | −13.6 |
| Turnout | | 1,840 | 29.4 | +4.5 |
| Labour hold | | Swing | N/A | |
| Conservative gain from Labour | | Swing | N/A | |

Ferryhill (3 seats)
| Party | Candidate | Votes | % | ±% |
|---|---|---|---|---|
| Independent | Brian Avery | 1,127 | 47.3 | +8.4 |
| Independent | Joe Makepeace | 834 | 35.0 | N/A |
| Labour | Peter Atkinson | 806 | 33.8 | −6.6 |
| Independent | David Farry | 740 | 31.1 | −4.3 |
| Labour | John Lindsay | 731 | 30.7 | −5.4 |
| Independent | Laura Wayman | 731 | 30.7 | N/A |
| Labour | Carole Atkinson | 722 | 30.3 | −2.4 |
| Conservative | Douglas Hutley | 367 | 15.4 | N/A |
| Turnout | | 2,383 | 29.6 | +2.8 |
| Independent hold | | Swing | N/A | |
| Independent gain from Labour | | Swing | N/A | |
| Labour hold | | Swing | N/A | |

Framwellgate and Newton Hall (3 seats)
| Party | Candidate | Votes | % | ±% |
|---|---|---|---|---|
| Liberal Democrats | Amanda Hopgood | 2,491 | 59.6 | +17.7 |
| Liberal Democrats | Mark Wilkes | 2,459 | 58.8 | +17.9 |
| Liberal Democrats | Frances Simmons | 2,286 | 54.6 | +17.2 |
| Labour | Dave Gill | 892 | 21.3 | −9.1 |
| Labour | Anne Bonner | 768 | 18.4 | −11.0 |
| Conservative | Joshua Morgan | 695 | 16.6 | +10.5 |
| Labour | Susan Nelson | 687 | 16.4 | −11.5 |
| Conservative | Philip Heath | 658 | 15.7 | +11.3 |
| Green | Elizabeth Bromley | 271 | 6.5 | +2.0 |
| Green | Clare Galland | 214 | 5.1 | +1.3 |
| Green | Rim Hassen | 212 | 5.1 | +1.5 |
| Turnout | | 4,183 | 40.4 | +3.7 |
| Liberal Democrats hold | | Swing | N/A | |
| Liberal Democrats hold | | Swing | N/A | |
| Liberal Democrats hold | | Swing | N/A | |

Horden (2 seats)
| Party | Candidate | Votes | % | ±% |
|---|---|---|---|---|
| Labour | Ian McLean | 748 | 48.4 | −24.1 |
| Labour | June Clark | 673 | 43.6 | −12.3 |
| North East | Mary Cartwright | 461 | 29.9 | N/A |
| Independent | John Maddison | 381 | 24.7 | N/A |
| North East | David Hawley | 265 | 17.2 | N/A |
| Independent | Doug Langan | 242 | 15.7 | −10.6 |
| Conservative | Kathleen Currie | 87 | 5.6 | N/A |
| Turnout | | 1,544 | 27.3 | +1.0 |
| Labour hold | | Swing | N/A | |
| Labour hold | | Swing | N/A | |

Lanchester (2 seats)
| Party | Candidate | Votes | % | ±% |
|---|---|---|---|---|
| Labour | Ossie Johnson | 937 | 42.8 | −15.4 |
| Labour | Jude Considine | 652 | 29.8 | −7.3 |
| Derwentside Independents | Richie Young | 642 | 29.3 | −13.6 |
| Derwentside Independents | John Ingham | 567 | 25.9 | N/A |
| Conservative | Richard Coad | 522 | 23.8 | +10.3 |
| Liberal Democrats | Keith English | 242 | 11.1 | N/A |
| Independent | David Lindsay | 203 | 9.3 | N/A |
| Liberal Democrats | David Rolfe | 161 | 7.4 | N/A |
| Turnout | | 2,190 | 36.9 | +3.6 |
| Labour hold | | Swing | N/A | |
| Labour gain from Derwentside Independents | | Swing | N/A | |

Leadgate and Medomsley (2 seats)
| Party | Candidate | Votes | % | ±% |
|---|---|---|---|---|
| Derwentside Independents | Watts Stelling | 1,426 | 58.7 | −0.4 |
| Derwentside Independents | Alan Shield | 1,275 | 52.5 | +4.5 |
| Labour | Liam Carr | 732 | 30.1 | −10.7 |
| Labour | Donna Summerson | 597 | 24.6 | −5.0 |
| Conservative | Gaynor-Anne Taffurelli | 331 | 13.6 | +5.0 |
| Turnout | | 6,690 | 36.3 | +2.4 |
| Derwentside Independents hold | | Swing | N/A | |
| Derwentside Independents hold | | Swing | N/A | |

Lumley (2 seats)
| Party | Candidate | Votes | % | ±% |
|---|---|---|---|---|
| Independent | Alan Bell | 1,079 | 52.8 | −5.9 |
| Independent | Audrey Willis | 824 | 40.3 | −7.9 |
| Labour | Anna Lavery | 523 | 25.6 | −14.3 |
| Independent | David Thompson | 510 | 24.9 | −15.0 |
| Labour | Lauren Anders | 396 | 19.4 | −16.2 |
| Conservative | Graham Fielder | 339 | 16.6 | N/A |
| Turnout | | 2,045 | 36.3 | +4.8 |
| Independent hold | | Swing | N/A | |
| Independent hold | | Swing | N/A | |

Murton (2 seats)
| Party | Candidate | Votes | % | ±% |
|---|---|---|---|---|
| Labour | Alan Napier | 983 | 53.4 | −21.6 |
| Labour | Joyce Maitland | 836 | 45.4 | −24.4 |
| Independent | Thomas Young | 604 | 32.8 | N/A |
| UKIP | Brian Brown | 370 | 20.1 | −3.1 |
| UKIP | Stephen Robson | 320 | 17.4 | −4.2 |
| Conservative | Oliver Lewis | 196 | 10.6 | N/A |
| Turnout | | 1,841 | 31.3 | +3.5 |
| Labour hold | | Swing | N/A | |
| Labour hold | | Swing | N/A | |

Neville's Cross (2 seats)
| Party | Candidate | Votes | % | ±% |
|---|---|---|---|---|
| Liberal Democrats | Liz Brown | 1,192 | 44.0 | −1.4 |
| Liberal Democrats | Elizabeth Scott | 1,056 | 39.0 | −5.2 |
| Green | Jonathan Elmer | 948 | 35.0 | +8.9 |
| Green | Sarah Thin | 724 | 26.7 | +1.5 |
| Conservative | William Halford | 347 | 12.8 | +3.5 |
| Conservative | Michael Smith | 309 | 11.4 | +1.4 |
| Labour | Owen Edwards | 274 | 10.1 | −9.0 |
| Labour | Maciej Matuszewski | 272 | 10.0 | −8.0 |
| Independent | Stephen Ashfield | 158 | 5.8 | −19.4 |
| Turnout | | 2,708 | 40.9 | +8.8 |
| Liberal Democrats hold | | Swing | N/A | |
| Liberal Democrats hold | | Swing | N/A | |

North Lodge (1 seat)
| Party | Candidate | Votes | % | ±% |
|---|---|---|---|---|
| Liberal Democrats | Craig Martin | 743 | 52.3 | +29.5 |
| Independent | Peter May | 464 | 32.7 | −14.8 |
| Labour | Saul Cahill | 110 | 7.7 | −17.6 |
| Conservative | John Middleton | 104 | 7.3 | +2.9 |
| Turnout | | 1,421 | 51.2 | +12.2 |
| Liberal Democrats gain from Independent | | Swing | N/A | |

=== P − S ===
Passfield (1 seat)
| Party | Candidate | Votes | % | ±% |
|---|---|---|---|---|
| North East | Karen Hawley | 337 | 34.0 | N/A |
| Independent | Joan Maslin | 296 | 29.9 | −6.7 |
| Labour | Barry Wilson | 201 | 20.3 | −14.8 |
| Conservative | Isaac Duffy | 157 | 15.8 | N/A |
| Turnout | | 991 | 28.4 | +2.3 |
| North East gain from Independent | | Swing | N/A | |

Pelton (3 seats)
| Party | Candidate | Votes | % | ±% |
|---|---|---|---|---|
| Labour | Alison Batey | 1,846 | 62.7 | −4.8 |
| Labour | Colin Carr | 1,431 | 48.6 | −5.1 |
| Labour | Danny Wood | 1,371 | 46.6 | −16.1 |
| Conservative | Michael Botterill | 1,000 | 34.0 | +17.8 |
| UKIP | Callum Redfern | 681 | 23.1 | −9.6 |
| Green | David Revett | 530 | 18.0 | N/A |
| Turnout | | 2,944 | 29.4 | +3.7 |
| Labour hold | | Swing | N/A | |
| Labour hold | | Swing | N/A | |
| Labour hold | | Swing | N/A | |

Peterlee East (2 seats)
| Party | Candidate | Votes | % | ±% |
|---|---|---|---|---|
| Labour | Audrey Laing | 586 | 46.1 | −6.8 |
| Labour | Harry Bennett | 568 | 44.7 | −13.2 |
| North East | Lee Cook | 547 | 43.1 | N/A |
| North East | Vik Watson | 531 | 41.8 | N/A |
| Conservative | Jonty Bayliss | 129 | 10.2 | N/A |
| Turnout | | 1,270 | 23.3 | −0.1 |
| Labour hold | | Swing | N/A | |
| Labour hold | | Swing | N/A | |

Peterlee West (2 seats)
| Party | Candidate | Votes | % | ±% |
|---|---|---|---|---|
| North East | Susan McDonnell | 736 | 49.6 | +11.4 |
| North East | Karon Liddell | 635 | 42.8 | N/A |
| Labour | Jimmy Alvey | 623 | 42.0 | −5.9 |
| Labour | Lisa Alvey | 549 | 37.0 | −1.8 |
| Conservative | Aaron Lee | 211 | 14.2 | +11.6 |
| Turnout | | 1,483 | 24.0 | +0.6 |
| North East gain from Labour | | Swing | N/A | |
| North East gain from Labour | | Swing | N/A | |

Sacriston (2 seats)
| Party | Candidate | Votes | % | ±% |
|---|---|---|---|---|
| Labour | Heather Liddle | 1,013 | 61.6 | +0.5 |
| Labour | Simon Wilson | 952 | 57.9 | −2.6 |
| Conservative | Graeme Hynds | 403 | 24.5 | +17.3 |
| UKIP | Michael Toms | 394 | 24.0 | +2.1 |
| Turnout | | 1,644 | 30.0 | +4.0 |
| Labour hold | | Swing | N/A | |
| Labour hold | | Swing | N/A | |

Seaham (2 seats)
| Party | Candidate | Votes | % | ±% |
|---|---|---|---|---|
| Labour | Geraldine Bleasdale | 634 | 39.2 | −11.9 |
| Labour | Sue Morrison | 604 | 37.4 | −10.4 |
| Seaham Community Party | Graeme Hepworth | 471 | 29.1 | N/A |
| Conservative | Derick Dixon | 468 | 28.9 | +9.9 |
| Seaham Community Party | Adam Remmer | 438 | 27.1 | N/A |
| Conservative | Margaret Reid | 402 | 24.9 | +10.6 |
| Green | Helen Reay | 94 | 5.8 | N/A |
| Turnout | | 1,617 | 30.1 | +5.2 |
| Labour hold | | Swing | N/A | |
| Labour hold | | Swing | N/A | |

Sedgefield (2 seats)
| Party | Candidate | Votes | % | ±% |
|---|---|---|---|---|
| Conservative | David Brown | 817 | 37.6 | −0.1 |
| Labour | John Robinson | 800 | 36.8 | −14.1 |
| Labour | Rachel Lumsdon | 733 | 33.7 | −7.3 |
| Independent | Mel Carr | 479 | 22.0 | N/A |
| Independent | Gloria Wills | 301 | 13.9 | N/A |
| Conservative | John Gasston | 293 | 13.5 | −15.5 |
| Liberal Democrats | Alan Bell | 193 | 8.9 | N/A |
| Independent | Jimmy Seymour | 168 | 7.7 | −13.8 |
| UKIP | Tim Illingworth | 144 | 6.6 | N/A |
| Independent | Christine Moore | 119 | 5.5 | N/A |
| Turnout | | 2,173 | 28.6 | −7.1 |
| Conservative gain from Labour | | Swing | N/A | |
| Labour hold | | Swing | N/A | |

Sherburn (2 seats)
| Party | Candidate | Votes | % | ±% |
|---|---|---|---|---|
| Labour | David Hall | 1,131 | 57.0 | +8.7 |
| Labour | Bill Kellett | 1,056 | 53.2 | +1.5 |
| Conservative | Raymond Taffurelli | 523 | 26.4 | +16.2 |
| Liberal Democrats | Ellie Hopgood | 452 | 22.8 | −11.1 |
| Liberal Democrats | Andrew Tibbs | 366 | 18.4 | −12.4 |
| Turnout | | 1,984 | 29.9 | −0.8 |
| Labour hold | | Swing | N/A | |
| Labour hold | | Swing | N/A | |

Shildon and Dene Valley (3 seats)
| Party | Candidate | Votes | % | ±% |
|---|---|---|---|---|
| Labour | Henry Nicholson | 1,172 | 43.1 | −2.8 |
| Labour | Brian Stephens | 1,129 | 41.5 | −9.7 |
| Labour | Shirley Quinn | 1,023 | 37.6 | −1.2 |
| Liberal Democrats | James Huntington | 817 | 30.0 | +3.8 |
| Independent | Robert Ingledew | 814 | 29.9 | +5.3 |
| Liberal Democrats | Lenny Cockfield | 625 | 23.0 | +8.0 |
| Conservative | Mary Gilbertson | 587 | 21.6 | N/A |
| UKIP | John Brigstock | 468 | 17.2 | N/A |
| Turnout | | 2,722 | 28.8 | +1.3 |
| Labour hold | | Swing | N/A | |
| Labour hold | | Swing | N/A | |
| Labour hold | | Swing | N/A | |

Shotton and South Hetton (2 seats)
| Party | Candidate | Votes | % | ±% |
|---|---|---|---|---|
| Independent | Ivan Cochrane | 808 | 45.7 | +4.5 |
| Labour | Eunice Huntington | 738 | 41.7 | −11.9 |
| Labour | Alan Liversidge | 695 | 39.3 | −13.0 |
| Independent | Christopher Hood | 617 | 34.9 | N/A |
| Conservative | Vicki Lincoln | 268 | 15.2 | N/A |
| Liberal Democrats | Christian Round | 103 | 5.8 | N/A |
| Turnout | | 1,768 | 26.7 | +2.7 |
| Independent gain from Labour | | Swing | N/A | |
| Labour hold | | Swing | N/A | |

Spennymoor (3 seats)
| Party | Candidate | Votes | % | ±% |
|---|---|---|---|---|
| Spennymoor Independents | Kevin Thompson | 1,140 | 36.9 | -6.3 |
| Spennymoor Independents | Geoff Darkes | 938 | 30.3 | N/A |
| Spennymoor Independents | Liz Maddison | 894 | 28.9 | -7.8 |
| Liberal Democrats | Ben Ord | 824 | 26.6 | −9.9 |
| Labour | Ian Geldard | 745 | 24.1 | −15.6 |
| Labour | Steven Jones | 642 | 20.8 | −17.3 |
| Independent | Pete Molloy | 601 | 19.4 | N/A |
| Liberal Democrats | Beckie Calder | 579 | 18.7 | N/A |
| Labour | Kathleen Griffiths | 517 | 16.7 | −19.6 |
| Liberal Democrats | Dean Ranyard | 517 | 16.7 | N/A |
| Conservative | Alan Booth | 362 | 11.7 | +3.8 |
| Conservative | Richard Child | 332 | 10.7 | N/A |
| UKIP | James Hargrave | 258 | 8.3 | N/A |
| Green | Mark Quinn | 130 | 4.2 | N/A |
| Turnout | | 3,092 | 36.2 | +8.6 |
Spennymoor Independents hold
Spennymoor Independents gain from Labour
Spennymoor Independents gain from Labour

Stanley (2 seats)
| Party | Candidate | Votes | % | ±% |
|---|---|---|---|---|
| Labour | Carl Marshall | 924 | 55.6 | −13.0 |
| Labour | Lyn Boyd | 919 | 55.3 | −7.6 |
| Derwentside Independents | David Walker | 496 | 29.8 | +2.9 |
| Derwentside Independents | Mary Wilkinson | 437 | 26.3 | N/A |
| Conservative | Gary McCallum | 250 | 15.0 | N/A |
| Turnout | | 1,662 | 26.5 | +1.4 |
| Labour hold | | Swing | N/A | |
| Labour hold | | Swing | N/A | |

=== T − W ===
Tanfield (2 seats)
| Party | Candidate | Votes | % | ±% |
|---|---|---|---|---|
| Derwentside Independents | Joyce Charlton | 929 | 46.7 | +4.2 |
| Labour | Olga Milburn | 839 | 42.1 | −7.9 |
| Labour | Gordon Binney | 800 | 40.2 | −1.0 |
| Derwentside Independents | Colin Thompson | 766 | 38.5 | +7.6 |
| Conservative | Kevin Foster | 274 | 13.8 | N/A |
| Liberal Democrats | Julia Wright | 94 | 4.7 | N/A |
| Turnout | | 1,991 | 30.4 | +3.7 |
| Derwentside Independents hold | | Swing | N/A | |
| Labour hold | | Swing | N/A | |

Tow Law (1 seat)
| Party | Candidate | Votes | % | ±% |
|---|---|---|---|---|
| Labour | Richard Manchester | 433 | 46.7 | +1.8 |
| Independent | John Bailey | 300 | 32.3 | N/A |
| Conservative | Andrew Dixon | 195 | 21.0 | N/A |
| Turnout | | 928 | 27.8 | +2.6 |
| Labour hold | | Swing | N/A | |

Trimdon and Thornley (3 seats)
| Party | Candidate | Votes | % | ±% |
|---|---|---|---|---|
| Labour | Lucy Hovvels | 1,433 | 58.9 | −6.6 |
| Labour | Peter Brookes | 1,413 | 58.1 | −5.9 |
| Labour | Morris Nicholls | 1,392 | 57.2 | −12.5 |
| UKIP | Clive Taylor-Sholl | 582 | 23.9 | +1.4 |
| Conservative | Ilsa Graham | 546 | 22.4 | N/A |
| Liberal Democrats | Martin Jones | 295 | 12.1 | N/A |
| Liberal Democrats | Elizabeth Temple | 231 | 9.5 | N/A |
| Turnout | | 2,433 | 25.0 | +0.1 |
| Labour hold | | Swing | N/A | |
| Labour hold | | Swing | N/A | |
| Labour hold | | Swing | N/A | |

Tudhoe (2 seats)
| Party | Candidate | Votes | % | ±% |
|---|---|---|---|---|
| Spennymoor Independents | Neil Grayson | 802 | 37.3 | +15.0 |
| Spennymoor Independents | Alan Gardner | 775 | 36.1 | +23.1 |
| Labour | Barbara Graham | 654 | 30.4 | −20.5 |
| Independent | Billy McAloon | 635 | 29.6 | N/A |
| Labour | Neil Foster | 624 | 29.1 | −17.7 |
| Conservative | Linda Raper | 367 | 17.1 | +11.1 |
| Turnout | | 2,148 | 33.7 | +1.7 |
Spennymoor Independents gain from Labour
Spennymoor Independents gain from Labour

Weardale (2 seats)
| Party | Candidate | Votes | % | ±% |
|---|---|---|---|---|
| Independent | John Shuttleworth | 1,899 | 63.8 | +4.0 |
| Independent | Mary Savory | 1,717 | 57.7 | +1.7 |
| Labour | Robert George | 509 | 17.1 | −18.7 |
| Conservative | Peter Gilbertson | 495 | 16.6 | +9.4 |
| Labour | Alan Myers | 358 | 12.0 | N/A |
| Turnout | | 2,976 | 45.6 | +3.9 |
| Independent hold | | Swing | N/A | |
| Independent hold | | Swing | N/A | |

West Auckland (2 seats)
| Party | Candidate | Votes | % | ±% |
|---|---|---|---|---|
| Labour | Rob Yorke | 808 | 49.5 | −5.8 |
| Labour | Christine Wilson | 759 | 46.5 | −2.4 |
| Conservative | Mark Roberts | 585 | 35.8 | +21.2 |
| Conservative | Victor Thompson | 359 | 22.0 | N/A |
| Independent | Alex Tighe | 254 | 15.6 | N/A |
| UKIP | Lee Harris | 239 | 14.6 | −10.4 |
| Turnout | | 1,633 | 25.2 | +4.1 |
| Labour hold | | Swing | N/A | |
| Labour hold | | Swing | N/A | |

Willington and Hunwick (2 seats)
| Party | Candidate | Votes | % | ±% |
|---|---|---|---|---|
| Labour | Fraser Tinsley | 1,086 | 58.8 | +6.0 |
| Labour | Olwyn Gunn | 1,069 | 57.9 | +7.3 |
| Conservative | Helen Hannar | 629 | 34.1 | +14.7 |
| Liberal Democrats | Samuel Richardson | 318 | 17.2 | N/A |
| Turnout | | 1,846 | 27.1 | +2.2 |
| Labour hold | | Swing | N/A | |
| Labour hold | | Swing | N/A | |

Wingate (1 seat)
| Party | Candidate | Votes | % | ±% |
|---|---|---|---|---|
| Labour | Robert Taylor | 577 | 73.7 | +5.9 |
| Conservative | Greta Pike | 107 | 13.6 | N/A |
| North East | Stephen Miles | 78 | 10.0 | N/A |
| Liberal Democrats | Cameron Lord | 21 | 2.7 | N/A |
| Turnout | | 783 | 26.0 | +1.6 |
| Labour hold | | Swing | N/A | |

Woodhouse Close (2 seats)
| Party | Candidate | Votes | % | ±% |
|---|---|---|---|---|
| Labour | John Lethbridge | 765 | 59.4 | +3.0 |
| Labour | Tanya Tucker | 594 | 46.2 | −2.7 |
| Conservative | Nichola Thompson | 396 | 30.8 | +24.5 |
| UKIP | Colin Race | 306 | 23.8 | N/A |
| Turnout | | 1,287 | 20.9 | +1.6 |
| Labour hold | | Swing | N/A | |
| Labour hold | | Swing | N/A | |

== By-elections ==
Trimdon and Thornley, 28 September 2017
| Party | Candidate | Votes | % | ±% |
|---|---|---|---|---|
| Labour | Judith Grant | 1,150 | 65.4 | +8.2 |
| Independent | Maurice Brown | 351 | 20.0 | N/A |
| Liberal Democrats | Alan Bell | 117 | 6.7 | −5.4 |
| Conservative | Michael Smith | 112 | 6.4 | −16.0 |
| Green | Jonathan Elmer | 29 | 1.6 | N/A |
| Turnout | | 1,759 | 18.2 | −6.8 |
| Labour hold | | Swing | N/A | |

Wingate, 14 March 2019
| Party | Candidate | Votes | % | ±% |
|---|---|---|---|---|
| Labour | John Higgins | 458 | 64.1 | −9.6 |
| Liberal Democrats | Edwin Simpson | 163 | 22.8 | +20.1 |
| North East | Stephen Miles | 74 | 10.3 | +0.3 |
| For Britain | Gareth Fry | 20 | 2.8 | N/A |
| Turnout | | 715 | 24.2 | −1.8 |
| Labour hold | | Swing | N/A | |

Esh and Witton Gilbert, 21 March 2019
| Party | Candidate | Votes | % | ±% |
|---|---|---|---|---|
| Liberal Democrats | Beverley Coult | 1,115 | 63.2 | +10.0 |
| Labour | Anne Bonner | 366 | 20.7 | −7.8 |
| Independent | Ryan Drion | 155 | 8.8 | N/A |
| Conservative | Richard Lawrie | 128 | 7.3 | −10.2 |
| Turnout | | 1,764 | 28.2 | −8.7 |
| Liberal Democrats hold | | Swing | N/A | |

Shildon and Dene Valley, 2 May 2019
| Party | Candidate | Votes | % | ±% |
|---|---|---|---|---|
| Liberal Democrats | James Huntington | 1,257 | 42.5 | +12.5 |
| Labour | Samantha Townsend | 682 | 23.0 | −20.1 |
| UKIP | Alan Breeze | 456 | 15.4 | −1.8 |
| Independent | Robert Ingledew | 415 | 14.0 | −15.9 |
| Conservative | Marie Carter-Robb | 151 | 5.1 | −16.5 |
| Turnout | | 2,961 | 31.2 | +2.4 |
| Liberal Democrats gain from Labour | | Swing | N/A | |

Spennymoor, 2 May 2019
| Party | Candidate | Votes | % | ±% |
|---|---|---|---|---|
| Independent | Ian Geldard | 489 | 18.7 | −5.4 |
| Labour | Colin Nelson | 420 | 16.1 | −8.0 |
| Liberal Democrats | Martin Jones | 373 | 14.3 | −12.3 |
| Independent | William McAloon | 358 | 13.7 | N/A |
| Independent | Peter Molloy | 332 | 12.7 | −6.7 |
| UKIP | Robert Purvis | 281 | 10.8 | +2.5 |
| Spennymoor Independents | Ronald Highley | 221 | 8.5 | −21.8 |
| Conservative | James Cosslett | 137 | 5.2 | −6.5 |
| Turnout | | 2,611 | 29.9 | −6.3 |
Independent gain from Spennymoor Independents
