= 2008 Durham County Council election =

UK local government election

Results by electoral division. Key: Conservative Labour Liberal Democrat Independent Derwentside Independents Striped wards have mixed representation.

Elections to Durham County Council took place on 1 May 2008, along with other local elections in the UK. This was the first election to the unitary authority established as part of the 2009 changes to local government, and all seats were up for election using the first past the post voting system. The election saw the council double in size to 126 councillors, with 63 electoral divisions each returning two members.

Labour kept control of the council with 67 seats. The Liberal Democrats were second with 27 seats and the Conservatives won 10. There were also 22 independents elected.

== Results ==
Durham County Council election, 2008
Party	Seats	Gains	Losses	Net gain/loss	Seats %	Votes %	Votes	+/−
Labour	67	—	—	—	53.2	36.4	56,422	▼20.3
Liberal Democrats	27	—	—	—	21.4	21.8	33,811	▲1.4
Independent	12	—	—	—	9.5	15.0	23,188	▲10.5
Conservative	10	—	—	—	7.9	14.9	23,076	▲0.2
Derwentside Independents	10	—	—	—	7.9	6.5	10,088	▲2.9
BNP	0	—	—	—	0.0	3.7	5,714	▲3.6
Teesdale Independent Association	0	—	—	—	0.0	1.3	2,009	▲1.3
Green	0	—	—	—	0.0	0.1	228	▲0.1
UKIP	0	—	—	—	0.0	0.1	184	▲0.1
Durham Taxpayers Alliance	0	—	—	—	0.0	0.1	111	▲0.1

== Results by electoral division ==
=== Chester-le-Street (14 seats) ===
Chester-le-Street North & East
Party	Candidate	Votes	%
Conservative	Beaty Bainbridge	1,144	23.8
Labour	John Shiell	999	20.8
Labour	Tracie Smith	983	20.5
Conservative	Maureen May	865	18.0
Independent	Lancelot Brown	807	16.8

Chester-le-Street South
Party	Candidate	Votes	%
Labour	Keith Davidson	898	17.7
Conservative	Alan Bainbridge	872	17.2
Liberal Democrats	Philip Nathan	813	16.0
Labour	Heather Liddle	737	14.5
Conservative	Nick Varley	611	12.0
Liberal Democrats	Brian Kinghorn	590	11.6
Independent	John Adey	560	11.0

Chester-le-Street West Central
Party	Candidate	Votes	%
Labour	Simon Henig	1,176	41.8
Labour	Linda Marshall	1,037	36.8
Conservative	Jacquelyn Butler	603	21.4

Lumley
Party	Candidate	Votes	%
Independent	A Bell	963	21.4
Independent	A Willis	959	21.3
Labour	B Walker	866	19.2
Labour	R Carr	709	15.7
Conservative	L D Nicholson	387	8.6
Conservative	J A Watson	340	7.5
Liberal Democrats	F Rowe	148	3.3
Liberal Democrats	G Cutting	137	3.0

Ouston and Urpeth
Party	Candidate	Votes	%
Labour	M Potts	868	21.5
Labour	C Carr	795	19.7
Liberal Democrats	G H Gardner	779	19.3
Conservative	J Gray	546	13.5
Liberal Democrats	D E Jackson	525	13.0
Conservative	O P May	520	12.9

Pelton
Party	Candidate	Votes	%
Labour	J Cordon	1,241	34.8
Conservative	P H May	1,240	34.8
Labour	M Sekowski	1,084	30.4

Sacriston
Party	Candidate	Votes	%
Labour	A Turner	996	33.1
Labour	A Wright	945	31.4
Liberal Democrats	L M Cowan	396	13.1
Liberal Democrats	E Waugh	363	12.0
Conservative	M Watson	313	10.4

=== Derwentside (22 seats) ===
Annfield Plain
Party	Candidate	Votes	%
Derwentside Independents	J Nicholson	899	25.0
Labour	M Hodgson	838	23.3
Derwentside Independents	D Walker	659	18.3
Labour	C Christer	653	18.2
Liberal Democrats	D Rolfe	382	10.6
Conservative	J M Webb	165	4.6

Benfieldside
Party	Candidate	Votes	%
Derwentside Independents	D I Barnett	638	16.9
Derwentside Independents	S Robinson	587	15.6
Labour	J Davies	536	14.2
Independent	K Devanney	533	14.1
Labour	D Llewellyn	491	12.8
Liberal Democrats	K English	475	12.4
Conservative	R Ellis	308	8.0
Liberal Democrats	J Fletcher	272	7.1

Burnopfield and Dipton
Party	Candidate	Votes	%
Derwentside Independents	B Alderson	1,117	25.3
Derwentside Independents	R Ord	1,033	23.4
Labour	E Turnbull	582	13.2
Labour	J Carr	568	12.9
Liberal Democrats	B Cook	443	10.0
Liberal Democrats	I Milburn	409	9.3
Conservative	R Ross	268	6.1

Consett North
Party	Candidate	Votes	%
Liberal Democrats	O Temple	1,026	22.1
Labour	C Robson	916	19.7
Liberal Democrats	N English	839	18.0
Derwentside Independents	M Westgarth	693	14.9
Labour	C Clarke	537	11.5
Derwentside Independents	F Todd	455	9.8
UKIP	A McDonald	184	3.9

Craghead and Southmoor
Party	Candidate	Votes	%
Labour	J Docherty	1,042	33.1
Labour	D Marshall	903	28.7
Independent	L Vaux	651	20.7
Liberal Democrats	C English	317	10.1
Conservative	R Dent	237	7.5

Delves Lane and Consett South
Party	Candidate	Votes	%
Labour	B Young	1,085	20.8
Labour	J Brown	958	18.4
Derwentside Independents	A Westgarth	925	17.8
Derwentside Independents	D Hicks	714	13.7
Independent	I McElhone	616	11.8
Independent	R McArdle	374	7.2
Conservative	J Ross	293	5.6
Liberal Democrats	L Temple	242	4.6

Esh
Party	Candidate	Votes	%
Labour	J Armstrong	793	22.1
Derwentside Independents	M Campbell	781	21.7
Labour	B Armstrong	703	19.6
Liberal Democrats	F Reynolds	494	13.7
Liberal Democrats	A Simpson	459	10.1
Conservative	P A Adams	364	10.1

Lanchester
Party	Candidate	Votes	%
Derwentside Independents	R Young	1,188	25.4
Labour	O Johnson	1,172	25.0
Labour	M Gray	975	20.1
Conservative	M Carr	890	18.9
Liberal Democrats	B Gilmore	460	9.8

Leadgate and Medomsley
Party	Candidate	Votes	%
Derwentside Independents	W Stelling	1,937	33.3
Derwentside Independents	A Shield	1,358	23.4
Labour	P Hughes	952	16.4
Labour	E Turner	862	14.8
Conservative	John Aken	443	7.6
Liberal Democrats	D Haney	259	4.5

Stanley
Party	Candidate	Votes	%
Labour	C Vasey	1,017	27.3
Labour	C Marshall	891	23.9
Derwentside Independents	J Pye	824	22.1
Derwentside Independents	D Walton	625	16.8
Liberal Democrats	N Jukes	196	5.3
Conservative	P Clemo	169	4.5

Tanfield
Party	Candidate	Votes	%
Derwentside Independents	J Hunter	1,086	24.9
Labour	J Wilson	950	21.9
Labour	E Hunter	912	20.9
Derwentside Independents	T Pattinson	866	19.9
Liberal Democrats	D Bowerbank	318	7.3
Conservative	M Nicholson	214	4.9

=== Durham (22 seats) ===
Belmont
Party	Candidate	Votes	%
Liberal Democrats	K Holroyd	1,393	32.0
Liberal Democrats	E S Mavin	1,255	28.8
Labour	T Johnston	475	10.9
Independent	A Walker	451	10.4
Labour	D M Hall	396	9.1
Conservative	T McCall	203	4.7
Conservative	J Wakefield	180	4.1

Brandon
Party	Candidate	Votes	%
Labour	P Taylor	1,257	28.5
Labour	R Rodgers	1,168	26.5
Liberal Democrats	M J A Smith	797	18.1
Liberal Democrats	C Clark	594	13.5
Conservative	H Hudson-Evans	217	4.9
BNP	H Clarke	203	4.6
BNP	S L Ross	178	4.0

Coxhoe
Party	Candidate	Votes	%
Labour	D Morgan	1,020	28.3
Labour	M L Plews	953	26.4
Independent	D Smith	744	20.6
Liberal Democrats	S E Millerchip	360	9.9
Conservative	C S Holt	266	7.4
Liberal Democrats	C Wigham	261	7.2

Deerness Valley
Party	Candidate	Votes	%
Liberal Democrats	J Wilkinson	1,266	22.3
Labour	J K Chaplow	1,254	22.1
Labour	D Bell	1,210	21.3
Liberal Democrats	P Guy	1,189	20.9
Conservative	K J M Currie	310	5.5
BNP	K Morton	244	4.3
BNP	P J Gray	196	3.5

Durham South
Party	Candidate	Votes	%
Labour	Mac Williams	963	23.6
Labour	Jan Blakey	867	21.2
Liberal Democrats	Robert Wynn	536	13.1
Liberal Democrats	Adam Walker	507	12.4
Conservative	Patrick Hague	316	7.7
Conservative	Rhys Burriss	311	7.6
Independent	Maggie Robinson	267	6.5
Independent	Martin Ridley	177	4.3
BNP	Katherine Lloyd	142	3.5

Elvet
Party	Candidate	Votes	%
Liberal Democrats	David Freeman	873	22.5
Liberal Democrats	David Stoker	684	17.6
Independent	Anji Rae	590	15.2
Labour	Jonathan Priestman Lovell	484	12.5
Conservative	Tim Hughes	433	11.2
Conservative	Chris Arthur	424	10.9
Labour	Katharine Ford	388	10.0

Framwellgate Moor
Party	Candidate	Votes	%
Liberal Democrats	Mark Wilkes	1,433	20.8
Liberal Democrats	Rev Crooks	1,400	20.3
Labour	George Burlinson	1,267	18.4
Labour	Marion Wilson	1,062	15.4
Independent	Terry Moderate	626	9.1
Conservative	Michael Bates	329	4.8
BNP	Ralph Musgrave	285	4.1
Independent	Simon Carey	257	3.7
Conservative	Pat Wynne	244	3.5

Gilesgate
Party	Candidate	Votes	%
Liberal Democrats	D J Southwell	1,324	25.9
Liberal Democrats	L Thomson	1,248	24.4
Labour	P Conway	1,022	19.9
Labour	P J Mitchell	978	19.1
Conservative	H W Cartwright	181	3.5
Conservative	E Hastie	163	3.2
Durham Taxpayers Alliance	R West	111	2.2
BNP	K Lloyd	90	1.8

Neville's Cross
Party	Candidate	Votes	%
Liberal Democrats	N Martin	1,514	29.9
Liberal Democrats	G Holland	1,364	26.9
Conservative	M Smith	411	8.1
Labour	N C Heaton	381	7.5
Independent	S J Ashfield	379	7.5
Labour	J G A Roberts	376	7.4
Conservative	C Smith	361	7.1
Independent	C M J Allen	281	5.5

Newton Hall
Party	Candidate	Votes	%
Liberal Democrats	A J Hopgood	1,419	28.1
Liberal Democrats	M Simmons	1,376	27.2
Independent	P Wolstenholme	676	13.4
Labour	S Emmas-Williams	515	10.2
Labour	H S Ferreira	409	8.1
Conservative	H D Osborn	354	7.0
Conservative	P Kirk	303	5.9

Sherburn
Party	Candidate	Votes	%
Liberal Democrats	Carol Woods	1,398	24.6
Liberal Democrats	Maureen Wood	1,308	23.0
Labour	Raymond Pye	1,165	20.5
Labour	Lesley Ann Broughton	1,106	19.5
Conservative	Nick Hallett	253	4.5
Green	Jo Smith	228	4.0
Conservative	Michael Fishwick	226	3.9

=== Easington (24 seats) ===
Blackhalls
Party	Candidate	Votes	%
Labour	A Cox	1,294	35.1
Labour	R Crute	1,251	33.9
Liberal Democrats	R Gibbon	599	16.3
Liberal Democrats	C Hindson	538	14.6

Dawdon
Party	Candidate	Votes	%
Independent	B Arthur	962	33.9
Labour	C Walker	763	26.9
Labour	E W Mason	717	25.3
Liberal Democrats	T Baxter	223	7.9
Liberal Democrats	A Crooks	167	5.9

Deneside
Party	Candidate	Votes	%
Labour	A Nugent	924	32.0
Labour	E Bell	897	31.1
Liberal Democrats	C M Harrison	403	13.9
Liberal Democrats	N Shaw	350	12.1
Independent	S P Colborn	313	10.8

Easington
Party	Candidate	Votes	%
Labour	D J Boyes	1,108	33.6
Labour	R Burnip	1,035	31.4
Liberal Democrats	B Graham	621	18.8
Liberal Democrats	J G T Lightley	533	16.2

Horden
Party	Candidate	Votes	%
Labour	P Stradling	1,442	42.3
Labour	D Maddison	1,271	37.3
Liberal Democrats	P Hudson	364	10.7
Conservative	M Riley	335	9.8

Murton
Party	Candidate	Votes	%
Labour	A Napier	1,401	38.9
Labour	A Naylor	1,285	35.8
Liberal Democrats	J K Hudson	474	13.2
Liberal Democrats	M Nolan	433	12.1

Peterlee East
Party	Candidate	Votes	%
Labour	A Laing	672	23.6
Labour	G Tennant	670	23.6
Independent	B Quinn	653	22.9
Independent	S Huntington	605	21.3
Liberal Democrats	M E Wells	242	8.5

Peterlee West
Party	Candidate	Votes	%
Liberal Democrats	B A Sloan	857	28.2
Liberal Democrats	R Liddle	833	27.4
Labour	G Pinkney	685	22.5
Labour	D J Taylor-Gooby	664	21.8

Seaham
Party	Candidate	Votes	%
Labour	D Myers	1,072	27.2
Labour	G Bleasdale	1,035	26.3
Conservative	D Dixon	949	24.1
Conservative	M Reid	878	22.3

Shotton
Party	Candidate	Votes	%
Labour	R J Todd	1,226	32.4
Labour	E Huntington	1,169	30.9
Independent	E W Hall	734	19.4
Liberal Democrats	S Walton	388	10.3
Liberal Democrats	C Saville	263	6.9

Thornley
Party	Candidate	Votes	%
Labour	M Nicholls	1,230	37.7
Independent	B Wilson	940	28.8
Labour	T Unsworth	776	23.8
Liberal Democrats	M Norman	320	9.8

Wingate
Party	Candidate	Votes	%
Independent	J Maslin	1,349	31.9
Labour	L O'Donnell	1,075	25.4
Labour	K McGonnell	1,055	24.9
Liberal Democrats	B Solaimon	750	17.7

=== Sedgefield (22 seats) ===
Aycliffe East
Party	Candidate	Votes	%
Labour	S Iveson	756	20.8
Labour	J Moran	708	19.5
Independent	B Blenkinsopp	594	16.3
Independent	B Haigh	309	8.5
BNP	H J Hilton	294	8.1
Independent	K Stubbs	232	6.4
Liberal Democrats	P J Thomas	218	5.9
BNP	J Palliser	190	5.2
Independent	A D Warburton	180	4.9
Liberal Democrats	D W Jago	154	4.2

Aycliffe North
Party	Candidate	Votes	%
Independent	P S Gittins	616	16.9
Labour	J Gray	565	15.6
Labour	K Henderson	504	13.9
Conservative	R Bagshaw	353	9.7
Independent	T Hogan	300	8.3
Liberal Democrats	A Bergg	295	8.1
	D Sutton-Lloyd	277	7.6
	A J Carter	218	6.0
Liberal Democrats	C Foote-Wood	189	5.2
Independent	S Haigh	161	4.4
Independent	L Cuthbertson	149	4.1

Aycliffe West
Party	Candidate	Votes	%
Independent	E M Paylor	678	20.0
Labour	M Dixon	665	19.6
Labour	V Crosby	651	19.2
Independent	H J Hutchinson	628	18.5
Liberal Democrats	M T Anderson	412	12.2
Liberal Democrats	J E Mawson	356	10.5

Chilton
Party	Candidate	Votes	%
Labour	C Potts	1,541	29.3
Labour	B Avery	1,508	28.7
BNP	A Whelpdale	853	16.2
BNP	C Whelpdale	839	15.9
Conservative	M Waller	517	9.8

Ferryhill
Party	Candidate	Votes	%
Independent	D Farry	1,174	22.6
Labour	C Magee	994	19.2
Labour	P Crathorne	898	17.3
Independent	K Storey	887	17.1
Liberal Democrats	P Mountford	634	12.2
BNP	A S Fowler	352	6.8
BNP	R Gray	245	4.7

Sedgefield
Party	Candidate	Votes	%
Conservative	D Brown	1,101	27.0
Labour	J Robinson	977	23.9
Independent	T D Brimm	650	15.9
Labour	F M Brown	604	14.8
Independent	G Willis	523	12.8
BNP	M S Colledge	118	2.9
BNP	J Collinson	104	2.6

Shildon East
Party	Candidate	Votes	%
Labour	B Stephens	872	21.4
Labour	D Bowman	827	20.3
Independent	I Hewitson	528	12.9
Liberal Democrats	L Cockfield	403	9.9
Independent	C Pollard	349	8.6
Conservative	N Crass	309	7.6
Conservative	M Miller	269	6.6
BNP	P Clarke	257	6.3
BNP	S J Brown	254	6.2

Shildon West
Party	Candidate	Votes	%
Liberal Democrats	J G Huntington	917	21.4
Independent	D M Hancock	685	15.9
Labour	V Chapman	636	14.8
Labour	A Walker	537	12.5
Independent	I Jackson	479	11.2
Liberal Democrats	G M R Howe	473	11.0
BNP	P J Ross	292	6.8
BNP	L Scott	264	6.2

Spennymoor and Middlestone
Party	Candidate	Votes	%
Liberal Democrats	B Ord	1,123	18.4
Liberal Democrats	K Thompson	1,059	17.3
Labour	A M Armstrong	941	15.4
Labour	W Waters	927	15.2
BNP	J Walker	890	14.6
BNP	J S Macpherson	720	11.8
Conservative	P A Carmedy	256	4.2
Conservative	C Platts	192	7.6

Trimdon
Party	Candidate	Votes	%
Labour	L Hovvells	1,138	31.6
Labour	P Brookes	968	26.9
Independent	A Bell	659	18.3
Conservative	C Moyle	388	10.8
BNP	P Sewell	223	6.2
BNP	M Claughan	222	6.2

Tudhoe
Party	Candidate	Votes	%
Labour	B Graham	1,105	17.9
Labour	N C Foster	1,062	17.3
BNP	A Walker	933	15.2
BNP	A Foster	842	13.7
Liberal Democrats	C Maddison	771	12.5
Liberal Democrats	L Maddison	752	12.2
Conservative	A T Cross	425	6.9
Conservative	P Gilbertson	255	4.1

=== Teesdale (6 seats) ===
Barnard Castle East
Party	Candidate	Votes	%
Conservative	Jo Fergus	1,137	34.0
Conservative	George Richardson	786	16.6
Independent	James Rowlandson	761	16.1
Independent	Tony Cooke	563	11.9
Teesdale Independent Association	Ken Hodgson	397	8.4
Teesdale Independent Association	William Salvin	379	8.0
Labour	Sylvia Bailes	367	7.8
Labour	Patrick Heaney	342	7.2

Barnard Castle West
Party	Candidate	Votes	%
Conservative	R A Bell	1,542	28.8
Conservative	B Harrison	972	18.2
Teesdale Independent Association	R Betton	964	18.0
Teesdale Independent Association	P Hughes	522	9.8
Labour	D W Armstrong	402	7.5
	J R Usher	386	7.2
Labour	P J Hunt	322	6.0
Independent	D A Wearmouth	237	4.4

Evenwood
Party	Candidate	Votes	%
Conservative	S Hugill	811	18.8
Labour	P M Charlton	784	18.2
Labour	J Priestley	769	17.9
Conservative	L Milner	708	16.5
Teesdale Independent Association	M J Clark	648	15.1
Teesdale Independent Association	P Ryman	583	13.5

=== Wear Valley (16 seats) ===
Bishop Auckland Town
Party	Candidate	Votes	%
Liberal Democrats	S Zair	984	22.2
Liberal Democrats	N A Harrison	840	18.9
Labour	B A Laurie	677	45.3
Conservative	C Raine	625	14.1
Conservative	J H Gasston	565	12.8
Labour	K Manton	491	11.1
BNP	C D Cooper	127	2.9
BNP	S R Cooper	117	2.6

Coundon
Party	Candidate	Votes	%
Liberal Democrats	T Taylor	669	23.7
Liberal Democrats	D Burn	634	22.5
Labour	P Graham	548	19.4
Labour	N Stonehouse	538	19.1
Conservative	J Firby	230	8.2
Conservative	J Milner	200	7.1

Crook North and Tow Law
Party	Candidate	Votes	%
Liberal Democrats	J Bailey	735	24.3
Liberal Democrats	P A Jopling	698	23.0
Labour	J Gale	563	18.6
Independent	R Grogan	558	18.4
Labour	L Brown	476	15.7

Crook South
Party	Candidate	Votes	%
Independent	E Murphy	749	22.0
Labour	E Tomlinson	729	21.5
Liberal Democrats	J Gooch	685	20.2
Liberal Democrats	G K Jopling	603	17.7
Labour	R Seabury	372	10.9
BNP	K Wilson	260	7.7

Weardale
Party	Candidate	Votes	%
Independent	J Shuttleworth	2,035	35.9
Independent	A Savory	1,029	18.2
Independent	T R Mews	564	9.9
Independent	L Shuttleworth	558	9.9
Independent	A A K Bolam	533	9.4
Conservative	C M Houghton	339	5.9
Labour	O E Gunn	195	3.4
Liberal Democrats	A C Simpson	159	2.8
Labour	A M Hiles	122	2.2
Liberal Democrats	R L Groves	119	2.1

West Auckland
Party	Candidate	Votes	%
Labour	R J Yorke	753	20.9
Labour	A H Turner	655	18.2
Conservative	J Tague	598	16.6
Conservative	P Laws	575	15.9
Liberal Democrats	J Ferguson	551	15.3
Liberal Democrats	V Perkins	462	12.9

Willington
Party	Candidate	Votes	%
Conservative	B Brunskill	1,210	24.7
Labour	B L Myers	927	18.9
Labour	M Pinkney	887	18.1
Conservative	L Dixon	712	14.5
Liberal Democrats	K A Bowser	368	7.5
Independent	J Cunningham	301	6.1
Liberal Democrats	D English	218	4.4
BNP	A Hodgson	151	3.1
BNP	J Snaith	129	2.6

Woodhouse Close
Party	Candidate	Votes	%
Labour	J Lethbridge	665	23.6
Labour	J E Lee	643	22.8
Liberal Democrats	A Anderson	585	20.7
Liberal Democrats	R Huntington	518	18.4
Conservative	C Firby	222	7.9
Conservative	A Welford	188	6.7
