= Derwentside District Council elections =

Local government elections in County Durham, England

Derwentside District Council elections were generally held every four years between the council's creation in 1974 and its abolition in 2009. Derwentside was a non-metropolitan district in County Durham, England. On 1 April 2009 the council's functions passed to Durham County Council, which became a unitary authority.

== Political control ==
The first election to the council was held in 1973, initially operating as a shadow authority before coming into its powers on 1 April 1974. Throughout the council's existence from 1974 to 2009, Labour held a majority of the seats on the council.

Party in control	Years
Labour	1974–2009

=== Leadership ===
The leaders of the council from 1991 until the council's abolition in 2009 were:

Councillor	Party	From	To
Joe Rhind	Labour		1991
Alex Watson	Labour	1991	2009

== Council elections ==
Election	Labour	Liberal Democrat (Note: Liberal Party prior to 1983, SDP-Liberal Alliance in 1983 and 1987.)	Conservative	Derwentside Independents	Independent	Total	Notes
1973	45	3	1	0	6	55	
1976	39	5	2	0	9 (Note: Includes 1 Residents Association)	55	
1979	30	3	6	0	16	55	New ward boundaries
1983	36	3 (Note: 2 Liberal, 1 SDP)	4	0	12	55	
1987	43	0	3	0	9	55	
1991	38	0	2	0	15	55	
1995	50	0	0	0	5	55	District boundary changes took place but the number of seats remained the same
1999	47	0	0	0	8	55	
2003	38	1	0	15	1	55	New ward boundaries
2007	29	2	0	23	1	55	

== Results maps ==
2003 results map

2007 results map

== By-election results ==
The following is an incomplete list of by-elections to Derwentside District Council.

=== 1995-1999 ===
Annfield Plain By-Election 20 February 1997
Party	Candidate	Votes	%	±%
Labour		525	79.3	
Independent Labour		137	20.7	
Majority		388	58.6	
Turnout		662	20.8	
Labour hold		Swing		

Stanley Hall By-Election 25 September 1997
Party	Candidate	Votes	%	±%
Labour		414	83.6	+8.8
Liberal Democrats		81	16.4	+16.4
Majority		333	67.2	
Turnout		495		
Labour hold		Swing		

Arnfield Plain By-Election 7 May 1998
Party	Candidate	Votes	%	±%
Labour		549	74.7	+5.0
Independent Labour		131	17.8	+17.8
Liberal Democrats		55	7.5	+7.5
Majority		418	66.9	
Turnout		735		
Labour hold		Swing		

=== 1999-2003 ===
Tanfield By-Election 22 June 2000
Party	Candidate	Votes	%	±%
Independent		468	53.7	+7.4
Labour		404	46.3	−7.4
Majority		64	7.4	
Turnout		872	26.5	
Independent gain from Labour		Swing		

Consett South By-Election 15 March 2001
Party	Candidate	Votes	%	±%
Labour		419	58.4	+0.8
Independent		157	21.9	−20.5
Independent		110	15.3	+15.3
Conservative		32	4.5	+4.5
Majority		262	36.5	
Turnout		718	22.3	
Labour hold		Swing		

Arnfield Plain By-Election 23 August 2001
Party	Candidate	Votes	%	±%
Labour		416	70.3	−0.8
Liberal Democrats		111	18.8	+18.8
Green		65	11.0	+11.0
Majority		305	51.5	
Turnout		592	19.2	
Labour hold		Swing		

Craghead By-Election 15 November 2001
Party	Candidate	Votes	%	±%
Labour		240	54.4	−13.8
Independent		201	45.6	+13.8
Majority		39	8.8	
Turnout		441	21.2	
Labour hold		Swing		

Consett South By-Election 17 January 2002
Party	Candidate	Votes	%	±%
Labour		319	63.0	+5.4
Independent		93	18.4	−24.0
Liberal Democrats		72	14.2	+14.2
Conservative		22	4.3	+4.3
Majority		226	44.6	
Turnout		506	15.6	
Labour hold		Swing		

Benfieldside By-Election 2 May 2002
Party	Candidate	Votes	%	±%
Labour	Tom Clark	469	32.5	−0.3
Liberal Democrats	Keith English	467	32.3	+11.4
Independent	Donald Love	404	28.0	+0.0
Conservative	Peter Carr	104	7.2	−5.3
Majority		2	0.2	
Turnout		1,444	31.9	
Labour hold		Swing		

=== 2003-2007 ===
Stanley Hall By-Election 29 September 2005
Party	Candidate	Votes	%	±%
Labour	Carl Marshall	599	65.4	+0.0
Liberal Democrats	David Rolfe	199	21.7	+1.1
BNP	Dean McAdam	118	12.9	+12.9
Majority		400	43.7	
Turnout		916	24.5	
Labour hold		Swing		

Cornsay By-Election 16 February 2006
Party	Candidate	Votes	%	±%
Labour	Barbara Armstrong	239	75.4	+44.7
Conservative	Peter Carr	78	24.6	+24.6
Majority		161	50.8	
Turnout		317	25.7	
Labour gain from Independent		Swing		

=== 2007-2009 ===
Castleside By-Election 17 July 2008
Party	Candidate	Votes	%	±%
Independent	Marion Wotherspoon	297	82.3	+8.3
Conservative	Michael Carr	64	17.7	+3.7
Majority		233	64.6	
Turnout		361	27.5	
Independent hold		Swing		
