= Katharine Ford =

Katharine Ford is a multi record-breaking British ultracyclist, Epilepsy campaigner and Non Executive Director in the sport industry.

== Personal life ==
Born in Glasgow in 1986, Aged 9, Katharine was diagnosed with Epilepsy, before undergoing major transformative brain surgery five years later at the Edinburgh Royal Hospital for Sick Children.

In 2012, she was nominated to carry the Olympic flame, which she did on 26 July 2012 in Camden. Her nomination was for her achievement in cycling and in raising epilepsy awareness.

== Ultra Cycling ==
To date Katharine is still the youngest British female and first ever Scot to officially complete the Race Across America, across all its categories, in her 4 lady team, aged 22 years and 2 months while still an Undergraduate student at Durham University.

In March 2017, she became the British record holder and holder of the second greatest distance ridden by a female on a Static Cycle (340.4 km), in accordance with Guinness World Record rules in 12 hours.

In July 2017, she became the first ever Briton to ride 12 Hours or more solo on an Indoor Velodrome and became the World Ultra Cycling Association Indoor Track Cycling world record holder across the 6 Hour, 100 km, 200 km & 300 km disciplines respectively. The ride raised comfortably over £23,000 for British charities, Epilepsy Action and the Edinburgh Children's Hospital Charity.

== Career ==
Ford is currently an Independent Director of the Team Scotland Youth Trust, Commonwealth Games Scotland's official charity.

Following the slate of elections in 2020 and with Nancy Guth finishing her term, during Jan 2020-21, Ford was the only female serving on the Board of Directors of the World Ultra Cycling Association. In January 2021, she was appointed as the organisation's first female Vice President in its 42-year history, the year after, she became the first female to lead the sport in the history of Ultracycling as WUCA's President.

She is former a Non-Executive Director of London disability sport organisation Interactive, London's body for disabled sport which became part of Sport London, and the Herne Hill Velodrome Trust in London, which regenerated the last surviving finals venue from the 1948 London Olympics.

== Epilepsy Advocacy ==
Katharine is an ambassador for the Edinburgh Sick Children's Hospital Charity, following work with the hospital over a number of years after she had been a patient in its neurology ward as a child. Following carrying the Olympic flame, she gifted her torch, to be held in trust in the hospital's neurology ward where it is used as a milestone for patients recovering from brain and spinal injuries to relearn to walk.

She has been heavily involved in awareness raising campaigns for epilepsy in the UK, including proving information on first aid for the condition and as an ambassador and using her trademark purple colours when riding her bike.

She had been a blogger for epilepsy awareness, through her blog The Diary of an Epileptic Ultra Cyclist for over eight years, also writing content for Young Epilepsy as a guest blogger about cycling.
