= North East Party =

British political party

The North East Party
- Leader: Mary Cartwright
- Founded: May 2014; 12 years ago
- Youth wing: North East Party Youth Wing
- Ideology: Regionalism
- Durham County Council: 0 / 126
- Peterlee Town Council: 9 / 22

Website
- www.thenortheastparty.com

The North East Party (NEP) is a regionalist political party in North East England founded in 2014 by a group of 16 people including the former Labour MP; Hilton Dawson, and 7 members of the FAIR party. The party campaigns for a better deal for North East England generally and was committed to a devolved assembly in the North East with powers similar to those in Wales, Scotland and Northern Ireland, if approved by a referendum. It says bodies such as the North East Combined Authority do not have a mandate to take on new responsibilities and representatives must be directly-elected. Dawson stepped down as Chair of the party in June 2016 and was replaced by John Tait. Dawson remained active in the party taking on the role of Secretary and Nominating Officer.

The party was deregistered in November 2023, before reregistration in March 2024. The party has controlled Peterlee Town Council since 2017, and previously had two elected councillors above parish council level, both on Durham County Council, although none of their candidates was elected at the 2025 Durham County Council election.

== History ==
The NEP was founded in May 2014 and is widely seen as a sister party to the Yorkshire Party. In December 2014, the party won its first council seat at a local by-election for Peterlee Town Council in County Durham. Two months later, the party won a second seat on the council in another by-election. Following these successes, the party contested and won several by-elections for both Durham County and local parish council seats during 2015 to 2017.

In the 2015 general election (the first election that the party fielded candidates), the North East Party contested four parliamentary seats, standing candidates in Easington, Newcastle upon Tyne North, Redcar and Stockton North. Its best performance came in Easington where candidate Susan McDonnell came in fifth of seven candidates and received 2.3% of the vote.

General election 2015
Constituency	Candidate	Votes	%
Easington	Susan McDonnell	810	2.3
Newcastle upon Tyne North	Violet Rook	338	0.7
Redcar	Philip Lockey	389	1.0
Stockton North	John Tait	601	1.5

In the May 2017 Durham County local government elections, the party stood 14 county councillor candidates and 27 town councillor candidates. Its candidates won three seats on Durham County Council (2 seats for Peterlee West, 1 seat for Passfield) and 23 seats on Durham County town councils including 20 of 22 seats at Peterlee Town Council, 2 of 8 north ward seats at Horden Parish Council, and one of 15 seats at Shotton Parish Council.

In the 2017 general election, the party ran in only one constituency, Easington. Susan McDonnell nearly tripled her vote total from 2015, saved her deposit with 6.6% of the vote, and came in third place ahead of the UKIP, Liberal Democrat, and Green candidates.

General election 2017
Constituency	Candidate	Votes	%
Easington	Susan McDonnell	2,355	6.6

The party stood two candidates in the 2019 general election.

General election 2019
Constituency	Candidate	Votes	%
Easington	Susan McDonnell	1,448	4.2
Stockton North	Mark Burdon	1,189	2.9

The party nominated its founding member Hilton Dawson in Hartlepool for the first parliamentary by-election of the 2020s. He came in tenth place.

2021 by-election
Constituency	Candidate	Votes	%
Hartlepool	Hilton Dawson	163	0.5

At the 2021 local elections, the party retained two of its councillors on Durham County Council in Passfield and Peterlee West wards. Despite losing their second seat in the latter ward, they gained both seats being contested in Peterlee East, thus bringing them to four councillors in total.

At the 2024 local elections, the party stood three candidates, and endorsed Independent candidate Jamie Driscoll for the inaugural North East mayoral election. None were elected.

The party stood one candidate in the 2024 general election.

General election 2024
Constituency	Candidate	Votes	%
Easington	Mary Cartwright	1,581	4.6

== List of chairs ==
No.	Name	Term of position	Notes
1	Hilton Dawson	June 2014 – June 2016	Founding member of The North East Party.
2	John Tait	June 2016 – July 2017	2015 Parliamentary Candidate for Stockton North.
3	Mary Cartwright	July 2017 – June 2019	
4	Mark Burdon	June 2019 – June 2020	
5	Susan McDonnell	June 2020 – June 2021	Parliamentary Candidate for Easington (2015, 2017 & 2019); County Councillor for Peterlee West on Durham County Council
6	Brian Moore	June 2021 - now	

== See also ==
- Yorkshire Party, a regional party calling for a Yorkshire Parliament
- Northern Party, a defunct regional party that was based in Lancashire
- Northern Independence Party, a secessionist party founded in 2020
