= Derwentside Independents =

- Leader: Alan Shield
- Founded: 2001
- Headquarters: Leadgate
- Ideology: Localism

Derwentside Independents is a localist political party in County Durham, England. It was established in 2001 to contest elections to Derwentside District Council, later contesting elections to Durham County Council following the establishment of a unitary authority in 2009.

== Background ==
Founded by former Councillor Bill Stockdale, the party benefited from the lack of organised opposition to the Labour Party from the main national political parties in Derwentside. Other officers are Ronald Weightman, nominating officer, and John Jopling, treasurer. According to its 2007 accounts, the party had 23 elected members and 22 general members. However, as of 2012 this was reduced to 9 Elected Members and 22 general members.

The party describes itself as an association of like-minded people who formed a party participating in local governance without any specific particular political bias. Each member represents the people who elected them and are not whipped to follow the leader or follow party lines.

== Election results ==
=== District Council ===
The party increased in strength following the 2003 local elections, gaining eight seats from the Labour Party in west and south Derwentside. At the final election to Derwentside District Council in 2007, the party gained a further 10 seats, bringing its total to 24 and reducing Labour's majority to three.

=== County Council ===
In March 2008, after feeling the Derwentside Independents could not offer a county-wide alternative to Labour, Councillor Bob Cook resigned from their ranks and joined the Liberal Democrats. He lost his seat at the subsequent local elections. A rival Durham County Council Independent Group led by John Shuttleworth formed in 2008.

Following the 2013 elections, the Derwentside Independents Party had eight councillors on the unitary Durham County Council. Their representation had fallen to seven councilors by 2016. The party was part of one of two groups of independents on the county council, and formed part of the opposition to the ruling Labour Party. In May 2025, the party lost their four remaining county council seats.

=== UK Parliament ===
Its leader, councillor Watts Stelling, contested the 2005 general election in the constituency of North West Durham.

=== Town Council ===
In May 2025, the party won 8 of 20 seats on Stanley Town Council.
