= Durham County Council elections =

Local government elections in County Durham, England

Durham County Council elections are held every four years. Durham County Council is the local authority for the unitary authority of County Durham. 98 councillors are elected from 51 wards.

== County council elections ==
| Election | Labour | Conservative | Liberal Democrat (Note: Liberal Party prior to 1981, SDP-Liberal Alliance in 1983, Social and Liberal Democrats in 1989) | Independent | Reform | Green | Total |
|---|---|---|---|---|---|---|---|
| 1973 | 56 | 2 | 6 | 7 | - | - | 72 |
| 1977 | 41 | 14 | 7 | 10 | - | - | 72 |
| 1981 (Note: New division boundaries.) | 53 | 7 | 6 | 6 | - | - | 72 |
| 1985 | 50 | 5 | 7 (Note: 3 Liberal, 4 SDP) | 10 (Note: Includes five of other parties) | - | - | 72 |
| 1989 | 56 | 7 | 5 | 4 | - | - | 72 |
| 1993 | 56 | 6 | 6 | 4 | - | - | 72 |
| 1997 | 53 | 2 | 2 | 4 | - | - | 61 |
| 2001 | 53 | 2 | 4 | 2 | - | - | 61 |
| 2005 (Note: New division boundaries.) | 53 | 2 | 5 | 3 | - | - | 63 |
| 2008 (Note: Same boundaries as 2005, with 2 councillors for each ward.) | 67 | 10 | 27 | 22 | - | 0 | 126 |
| 2013 (Note: New ward boundaries.) | 94 | 4 | 9 | 19 | - | 0 | 126 |
| 2017 | 74 | 10 | 14 | 28 | - | 0 | 126 |
| 2021 | 53 | 24 | 17 | 32 | 0 | 1 | 126 |
| 2025 (Note: New ward boundaries.) | 4 | 1 | 14 | 12 | 65 | 2 | 98 |

== County result maps ==
2005 results map

2008 results map

2013 results map

2017 results map

2021 results map

2025 results map

== District council elections ==
Prior to the formation of the unitary authority in 2009, the county was divided into a number of second tier districts. The following articles detail the local elections to those district councils. The Borough of Darlington has formed a unitary authority outside the area covered by the County Council since 1997.

- Chester-le-Street District Council elections, 1973 – 2009 (council abolished)
- Durham City Council elections, 1973 – 2009 (council abolished)
- Darlington Borough Council elections, 1973 – 1997 (unitary authority 1997 – present)
- Derwentside District Council elections, 1973 – 2009 (council abolished)
- Easington District Council elections, 1973 – 2009 (council abolished)
- Sedgefield Borough Council elections, 1973 – 2009 (council abolished)
- Teesdale District Council elections, 1973 – 2009 (council abolished)
- Wear Valley District Council elections, 1973 – 2009 (council abolished)

== By-election results ==
The following is an incomplete list of by-elections to Durham County Council.

=== 1997–2008 ===
Bishop Auckland Town by-election, 30 March 2000
| Party | Candidate | Votes | % | ±% |
|---|---|---|---|---|
| Liberal Democrats | | 689 | 42.9 | +1.2 |
| Labour | | 601 | 37.4 | −21.0 |
| Conservative | | 318 | 19.8 | +19.8 |
| Majority | | 88 | 5.5 | |
| Turnout | | 1,608 | 22.5 | |
| Liberal Democrats gain from Labour | | Swing | | |

Burnopfield and Dipton by-election, 28 November 2002
| Party | Candidate | Votes | % | ±% |
|---|---|---|---|---|
| Independent | Reginald Ord | 519 | 37.2 | +2.2 |
| Labour | | 500 | 35.8 | −18.3 |
| Liberal Democrats | | 322 | 23.1 | +23.1 |
| Conservative | | 54 | 3.9 | −7.1 |
| Majority | | 19 | 1.4 | |
| Turnout | | 1,395 | 22.0 | |
| Independent gain from Labour | | Swing | | |

Stanley by-election, 17 July 2003
| Party | Candidate | Votes | % | ±% |
|---|---|---|---|---|
| Labour | Leslie Vaux | 1,702 | 56.1 | −20.6 |
| Liberal Democrats | David Rolfe | 566 | 18.7 | +4.3 |
| BNP | Dean McAdam | 509 | 16.8 | +16.8 |
| Conservative | Stuart Tilney | 256 | 8.4 | −0.5 |
| Majority | | 1,136 | 37.4 | |
| Turnout | | 3,033 | 46.4 | |
| Labour hold | | Swing | | |

Woodhouse Close by-election, 26 February 2004
| Party | Candidate | Votes | % | ±% |
|---|---|---|---|---|
| Labour | John Lethbridge | 1,538 | 66.3 | −2.0 |
| Liberal Democrats | Jody Dunn | 782 | 33.7 | +9.6 |
| Majority | | 756 | 32.6 | |
| Turnout | | 2,320 | 43.7 | |
| Labour hold | | Swing | | |

Durham South by-election, 26 January 2006
| Party | Candidate | Votes | % | ±% |
|---|---|---|---|---|
| Labour | Abiodun Williams | 834 | 51.6 | +4.8 |
| Liberal Democrats | Isobell Lunan | 561 | 34.7 | −9.1 |
| Conservative | Michael Fishwick | 220 | 13.6 | +4.2 |
| Majority | | 273 | 16.9 | |
| Turnout | | 1,615 | 34.0 | |
| Labour hold | | Swing | | |

Framwellgate Moor by-election, 8 June 2006
| Party | Candidate | Votes | % | ±% |
|---|---|---|---|---|
| Labour | George Burlison | 1,187 | 43.4 | −5.5 |
| Liberal Democrats | Redvers Crooks | 1,037 | 37.9 | −2.9 |
| Independent | Ian Rutland | 267 | 9.8 | +9.8 |
| Conservative | Patricia Wynne | 245 | 9.0 | −1.4 |
| Majority | | 150 | 5.5 | |
| Turnout | | 2,737 | 37.1 | |
| Labour hold | | Swing | | |

Dawden by-election, 19 October 2006
| Party | Candidate | Votes | % | ±% |
|---|---|---|---|---|
| Labour | Edwin Mason | 775 | 84.0 | +4.3 |
| Conservative | Lucille Nicholson | 148 | 16.0 | −4.3 |
| Majority | | 627 | 68.0 | |
| Turnout | | 923 | 18.7 | |
| Labour hold | | Swing | | |

Ouston and Urpeth by-election, 30 November 2006
| Party | Candidate | Votes | % | ±% |
|---|---|---|---|---|
| Labour | Colin Carr | 665 | 57.7 | −2.8 |
| Liberal Democrats | Sean Kilkenny | 487 | 42.3 | +19.2 |
| Majority | | 178 | 15.4 | |
| Turnout | | 1,152 | 18.6 | |
| Labour hold | | Swing | | |

=== 2008–2013 ===
Barnard Castle East by-election, 4 June 2009
| Party | Candidate | Votes | % | ±% |
|---|---|---|---|---|
| Conservative | James Rowlandson | 1,263 | 46.9 | +4.2 |
| Independent | Anthony Cooke | 634 | 23.5 | −20.0 |
| Liberal Democrats | Michael Newlands | 479 | 17.8 | +17.8 |
| Labour | Sharon Longcroft | 319 | 11.8 | −1.9 |
| Majority | | 629 | 23.4 | |
| Turnout | | 2,695 | 38.9 | |
| Conservative hold | | Swing | | |

Easington by-election, 11 February 2010
| Party | Candidate | Votes | % | ±% |
|---|---|---|---|---|
| Labour | Alan Barker | 702 | 55.8 | −8.3 |
| Independent | Terry Murray | 311 | 24.7 | +24.7 |
| Liberal Democrats | Carole Harrison | 126 | 10.0 | −25.9 |
| Conservative | Margaret Reid | 120 | 9.5 | +9.5 |
| Majority | | 391 | 31.1 | |
| Turnout | | 1,259 | 20.9 | |
| Labour hold | | Swing | | |

Brandon by-election, 30 September 2010
| Party | Candidate | Votes | % | ±% |
|---|---|---|---|---|
| Labour | John Turnbull | 1,204 | 64.0 | +13.2 |
| Liberal Democrats | Maureen Smith | 538 | 28.6 | −3.6 |
| Conservative | Mark Krajewski | 140 | 7.4 | −1.4 |
| Majority | | 666 | 35.4 | |
| Turnout | | 1,882 | | |
| Labour hold | | Swing | | |

Deneside by-election, 14 October 2010
| Party | Candidate | Votes | % | ±% |
|---|---|---|---|---|
| Labour | Jennifer Bell | 917 | 82.4 | +26.1 |
| Conservative | Margaret Reid | 196 | 17.6 | +17.6 |
| Majority | | 721 | 64.8 | |
| Turnout | | 1,113 | | |
| Labour hold | | Swing | | |

Peterlee West by-election, 21 June 2012
| Party | Candidate | Votes | % | ±% |
|---|---|---|---|---|
| Labour | Jimmy Alvey | 767 | 70.1 | +25.7 |
| Independent | Karen Hawley | 181 | 16.5 | +16.5 |
| Liberal Democrats | Wendy Bentley | 99 | 9.0 | −46.6 |
| Conservative | Harvey Morgan | 47 | 4.3 | +4.3 |
| Majority | | 586 | 53.6 | |
| Turnout | | 1,094 | | |
| Labour gain from Liberal Democrats | | Swing | | |

=== 2013–2017 ===
Crook by-election, 7 November 2013
| Party | Candidate | Votes | % | ±% |
|---|---|---|---|---|
| Labour | Andrea Patterson | 741 | 40.3 | |
| Independent | Ian Hirst | 496 | 27.0 | |
| Wear Valley Independent Group | John Bailey | 360 | 19.6 | |
| Liberal Democrats | David English | 145 | 7.9 | |
| Conservative | Beaty Bainbridge | 54 | 2.9 | |
| Green | Joanne Yelland | 41 | 2.2 | |
| Majority | | 245 | 13.3 | |
| Turnout | | 1837 | 18.6 | |
| Labour hold | | Swing | | |

Crook by-election, 18 September 2014
| Party | Candidate | Votes | % | ±% |
|---|---|---|---|---|
| Labour | Maureen Stanton | 753 | 46.8 | +16.0 |
| UKIP | Betty Hopson | 339 | 21.1 | +21.1 |
| Liberal Democrats | David English | 233 | 14.5 | +7.6 |
| Independent | Tony Simpson | 193 | 12.0 | +12.0 |
| Conservative | Alan Booth | 90 | 5.6 | +5.6 |
| Majority | | 414 | 25.7 | |
| Turnout | | 1,608 | | |
| Labour gain from Independent | | Swing | | |

Burnopfield and Dipton by-election, 23 October 2014
| Party | Candidate | Votes | % | ±% |
|---|---|---|---|---|
| Labour | Joanne Carr | 656 | 44.9 | +6.8 |
| Derwentside Independents | Gill Burnett | 655 | 44.8 | +3.5 |
| Conservative | Alan Booth | 83 | 5.7 | +5.7 |
| Green | Melanie Howd | 68 | 4.7 | +4.7 |
| Majority | | 1 | 0.1 | |
| Turnout | | 1,462 | | |
| Labour gain from Derwentside Independents | | Swing | | |

Evenwood by-election, 23 October 2014
| Party | Candidate | Votes | % | ±% |
|---|---|---|---|---|
| Labour | Heather Smith | 546 | 38.2 | −7.8 |
| Conservative | Stephen Hugill | 396 | 27.7 | −0.3 |
| UKIP | Ben Casey | 309 | 21.6 | −4.4 |
| Independent | Lee Carnighan | 108 | 7.5 | +7.5 |
| Green | Greg Robinson | 72 | 5.0 | +5.0 |
| Majority | | 150 | 10.5 | |
| Turnout | | 1,431 | | |
| Labour hold | | Swing | | |

Barnard Castle West by-election, 7 May 2015
| Party | Candidate | Votes | % | ±% |
|---|---|---|---|---|
| Conservative | Edward Henderson | 2,518 | 57.6 | −1.8 |
| Green | Thomas Robinson | 972 | 22.3 | +1.8 |
| Labour | Philip Hunt | 878 | 20.1 | +0.0 |
| Majority | | 1,546 | 35.4 | |
| Turnout | | 4,368 | | |
| Conservative hold | | Swing | | |

Ferryhill by-election, 7 May 2015
| Party | Candidate | Votes | % | ±% |
|---|---|---|---|---|
| Labour | John Lindsay | 2,266 | 49.8 | +14.8 |
| Independent | Joseph Makepeace | 1,969 | 43.3 | +43.3 |
| Green | William Lawrence | 316 | 6.9 | +6.9 |
| Majority | | 297 | 6.5 | |
| Turnout | | 4,551 | | |
| Labour hold | | Swing | | |

Sherburn by-election, 7 May 2015
| Party | Candidate | Votes | % | ±% |
|---|---|---|---|---|
| Labour | William Kellett | 2,218 | 52.5 | +4.1 |
| Conservative | Michael Fishwick | 965 | 22.9 | +13.4 |
| Liberal Democrats | Andrew Tibbs | 531 | 12.6 | −19.1 |
| Green | Joanna Smith | 508 | 12.0 | +12.0 |
| Majority | | 1,253 | 29.7 | |
| Turnout | | 4,222 | | |
| Labour hold | | Swing | | |

Willington and Hunwick by-election, 7 May 2015
| Party | Candidate | Votes | % | ±% |
|---|---|---|---|---|
| Labour | Fraser Tinsley | 2,169 | 54.5 | +8.5 |
| Independent | Matthew Todd | 1,512 | 38.0 | +38.0 |
| Green | Mark Quinn | 301 | 7.6 | +7.6 |
| Majority | | 657 | 16.5 | |
| Turnout | | 3,982 | | |
| Labour hold | | Swing | | |

Shotton and South Hetton by-election, 20 August 2015
| Party | Candidate | Votes | % | ±% |
|---|---|---|---|---|
| Labour | Alan Liversidge | 595 | 52.5 | +9.4 |
| North East | Ted Hall | 214 | 18.9 | +18.9 |
| UKIP | Lee-James Harris | 131 | 11.6 | +11.6 |
| Liberal Democrats | Michael Anderson | 107 | 9.4 | +9.4 |
| Conservative | Beaty Bainbridge | 67 | 5.9 | +5.9 |
| Green | Martie Warin | 19 | 1.7 | +1.7 |
| Majority | | 381 | 33.6 | |
| Turnout | | 1,133 | | |
| Labour hold | | Swing | | |

=== 2017–2021 ===
Dawdon by-election, 29 June 2017
| Party | Candidate | Votes | % | ±% |
|---|---|---|---|---|
| Labour | Leanne Kennedy | 693 | 52.3 | +6.2 |
| Seaham Community Party | Robert Arthur | 633 | 47.7 | +10.8 |
| Majority | | 60 | 4.6 | |
| Turnout | | 1,329 | 21.3 | |
| Labour hold | | Swing | | |

Trimdon and Thornley by-election, 28 September 2017
| Party | Candidate | Votes | % | ±% |
|---|---|---|---|---|
| Labour | Jude Grant | 1,150 | 65.4 | +15.2 |
| Independent | Maurice Brown | 351 | 20.0 | +20.0 |
| Liberal Democrats | Alan Bell | 117 | 6.7 | −3.6 |
| Conservative | Michael Smith | 112 | 6.4 | −12.7 |
| Green | Jonathan Elmer | 29 | 1.6 | +1.6 |
| Majority | | 799 | 45.4 | |
| Turnout | | 1,759 | | |
| Labour hold | | Swing | | |

Wingate by-election, 14 March 2019
| Party | Candidate | Votes | % | ±% |
|---|---|---|---|---|
| Labour | John Higgins | 458 | 64.1 | −9.6 |
| Liberal Democrats | Edwin Simpson | 163 | 22.8 | +20.1 |
| North East | Stephen Miles | 74 | 10.3 | +0.3 |
| For Britain | Gareth Fry | 20 | 2.8 | +2.8 |
| Majority | | 295 | 41.3 | |
| Turnout | | 715 | | |
| Labour hold | | Swing | | |

Esh and Witton Gilbert by-election, 21 March 2019
| Party | Candidate | Votes | % | ±% |
|---|---|---|---|---|
| Liberal Democrats | Beverley Coult | 1,115 | 63.2 | +7.8 |
| Labour | Anne Bonner | 366 | 20.7 | −7.0 |
| Independent | Ryan Drion | 155 | 8.8 | +8.8 |
| Conservative | Richard Lawrie | 128 | 7.3 | −9.6 |
| Majority | | 749 | 42.5 | |
| Turnout | | 1,764 | | |
| Liberal Democrats hold | | Swing | | |

Shildon and Dene Valley by-election, 2 May 2019
| Party | Candidate | Votes | % | ±% |
|---|---|---|---|---|
| Liberal Democrats | James Huntington | 1,257 | 42.7 | +21.5 |
| Labour | Samantha Townsend | 682 | 23.2 | −7.2 |
| UKIP | Alan Breeze | 456 | 15.5 | +3.4 |
| Independent | Robert Ingledew | 415 | 14.1 | −7.0 |
| Conservative | Marie Carter-Robb | 131 | 4.5 | −10.7 |
| Majority | | 575 | 19.6 | |
| Turnout | | 2,941 | | |
| Liberal Democrats gain from Labour | | Swing | | |

Spennymoor by-election, 2 May 2019
| Party | Candidate | Votes | % | ±% |
|---|---|---|---|---|
| Independent | Ian Geldard | 489 | 18.7 | +18.7 |
| Labour | Colin Nelson | 420 | 16.1 | −2.2 |
| Liberal Democrats | Martin Jones | 373 | 14.3 | −6.0 |
| Independent | Billy McAloon | 358 | 13.7 | +13.7 |
| Independent | Pete Molloy | 332 | 12.7 | −2.1 |
| UKIP | Bob Purvis | 281 | 10.8 | +4.4 |
| Spennymoor Independents | Ronald Highley | 221 | 8.5 | −19.6 |
| Conservative | James Cosslett | 137 | 5.2 | −3.7 |
| Majority | | 69 | 2.6 | |
| Turnout | | 2,611 | | |
| Independent gain from Spennymoor Independents | | Swing | | |

=== 2021–2025 ===
Ferryhill by-election, 24 February 2022
| Party | Candidate | Votes | % | ±% |
|---|---|---|---|---|
| Labour | Curtis Bihari | 876 | 41.3 | +6.4 |
| Independent | Glenys Newby | 528 | 24.9 | +24.9 |
| Conservative | David Farry | 348 | 16.4 | −11.9 |
| Independent | Joseph Makepeace | 166 | 7.8 | +7.8 |
| Green | Rebecca Dixon-McWaters | 165 | 7.8 | +7.8 |
| Freedom Alliance | Kaela Banthorpe | 23 | 1.3 | +1.3 |
| Liberal Democrats | Bill Thorkildsen | 9 | 0.4 | +0.4 |
| Majority | | 348 | 16.4 | |
| Turnout | | 2,120 | | |
| Labour gain from Independent | | Swing | | |

West Auckland by-election, 14 April 2022
| Party | Candidate | Votes | % | ±% |
|---|---|---|---|---|
| Labour | George Smith | 956 | 56.3 | +12.2 |
| Conservative | Lyndsey Fox | 554 | 32.6 | −10.2 |
| Independent | Nick Brown | 187 | 11.0 | +11.0 |
| Majority | | 402 | 23.7 | |
| Turnout | | 1,697 | | |
| Labour gain from Conservative | | Swing | | |

Chester-le-Street East by-election, 14 April 2022
| Party | Candidate | Votes | % | ±% |
|---|---|---|---|---|
| Labour | Julie Scurfield | 716 | 59.8 | +28.9 |
| Conservative | Allan Bainbridge | 439 | 36.6 | −4.9 |
| Liberal Democrats | Russell Haswell | 43 | 3.6 | −1.4 |
| Majority | | 277 | 23.1 | |
| Turnout | | 1,198 | | |
| Labour gain from Conservative | | Swing | | |

Dawdon by-election, 30 November 2023
| Party | Candidate | Votes | % | ±% |
|---|---|---|---|---|
| Labour | June Watson | 514 | 55.9 | +5.4 |
| Independent | Bob Arthur | 339 | 36.9 | +36.9 |
| Conservative | Josh Rayner | 56 | 6.1 | −10.0 |
| Liberal Democrats | Roger Vila | 10 | 1.1 | +1.1 |
| Majority | | 175 | 19.0 | |
| Turnout | | 919 | | |
| Labour hold | | Swing | | |

Horden by-election, 2 May 2024
| Party | Candidate | Votes | % | ±% |
|---|---|---|---|---|
| Labour | June Clark | 852 | 76.2 | +8.3 |
| North East | Robert Fishwick | 180 | 16.1 | −10.4 |
| Conservative | George Carter | 66 | 5.9 | −9.7 |
| Liberal Democrats | Neil Thompson | 20 | 1.8 | +1.8 |
| Majority | | 672 | 60.1 | |
| Turnout | | 1,118 | | |
| Labour hold | | Swing | | |

Coxhoe by-election, 4 July 2024
| Party | Candidate | Votes | % | ±% |
|---|---|---|---|---|
| Labour | Viv Anderson | 2,479 | 43.5 | +9.9 |
| Independent | Jamie Peterson | 1,257 | 22.1 | +22.1 |
| Independent | Stuart Dunn | 938 | 16.5 | +16.5 |
| Conservative | Oliver Peeke | 705 | 12.4 | −5.9 |
| Liberal Democrats | Martin Jones | 318 | 5.6 | +1.9 |
| Majority | | 1,222 | 21.4 | |
| Turnout | | 5,697 | | |
| Labour hold | | Swing | | |

=== 2025–2029 ===
Andrew Kilburn, who won a seat in the 2025 election, did not take up his seat due to being disqualified as a local government employee.

Benfieldside by-election, 3 July 2025
| Party | Candidate | Votes | % | ±% |
|---|---|---|---|---|
| Liberal Democrats | Terry Rooney | 824 | 28.0 | +16.5 |
| Labour | Kevin Earley | 800 | 27.2 | +0.8 |
| Reform | Stephen Harrison | 747 | 25.4 | −6.6 |
| Independent | Stephen Robinson | 459 | 15.6 | −9.3 |
| Conservative | David Lowes | 76 | 2.6 | −4.3 |
| Green | Richard Simpson | 40 | 1.4 | |
| Majority | | 24 | 0.8 | |
| Turnout | | 2,953 | 37 | |
| Liberal Democrats gain from Reform | | Swing | | |

Murton by-election, 5 March 2026
| Party | Candidate | Votes | % | ±% |
|---|---|---|---|---|
| Labour | Julie Griffiths | 1,004 | 50.6 | |
| Reform | Theo Bell | 786 | 39.6 | |
| Green | Isaac Short | 95 | 4.8 | |
| Conservative | Dorothy Luckhurst | 61 | 3.1 | |
| Liberal Democrats | Neil Thompson | 38 | 1.9 | |
| Majority | | 218 | 11.0 | |
| Turnout | | 1,981 | | |
| Labour gain from Reform | | Swing | | |

Craghead and South Moor by-election, 19 November 2026
| Party | Candidate | Votes | % | ±% |
|---|---|---|---|---|
| Reform | Mark Taylor | 820 | 42.8 | −15.2 |
| Labour | Les Timbey | 728 | 38.0 | +11.5 |
| Restore | Jean Thomson | 153 | 8.0 | +8.0 |
| Liberal Democrats | Victoria Aymard | 93 | 4.9 | −5.2 |
| Green | Callum Hutchinson | 70 | 3.7 | +3.7 |
| Conservative | Dorothy Luckhurst | 53 | 2.8 | −2.6 |
| Majority | | 92 | 4.8 | |
| Turnout | | 1,917 | | |
| Reform hold | | Swing | | |
