= Darlington Borough Council elections =

Local government elections in County Durham, England

Darlington Borough Council elections are held every four years. Darlington Borough Council is the local authority for the unitary authority of Darlington in County Durham, England. Until 1 April 1997 it was a non-metropolitan district.

== Political control ==
Elected Councillors
| | Labour | Conservatives | Liberal Democrats | Greens | Independent | Total |
| 1973 | 28 | 8 | 8 | 0 | 5 | 49 |
| 1976 | 15 | 30 | 0 | 0 | 5 | 50 |
| 1979 | 29 | 14 | 1 | 0 | 8 | 52 |
| 1983 | 27 | 20 | 2 | 0 | 3 | 52 |
| 1987 | 24 | 24 | 0 | 0 | 4 | 52 |
| 1991 | 29 | 19 | 2 | 0 | 2 | 52 |
| 1995 | 35 | 14 | 2 | 0 | 1 | 52 |
| 1996 | 36 | 13 | 2 | 0 | 1 | 52 |
| 1999 | 35 | 15 | 2 | 0 | 0 | 52 |
| 2003 | 35 | 15 | 2 | 0 | 0 | 52 |
| 2007 | 29 | 18 | 6 | 0 | 0 | 53 |
| 2011 | 34 | 14 | 5 | 0 | 0 | 53 |
| 2015 | 29 | 17 | 3 | 0 | 1 | 50 |
| 2019 | 20 | 22 | 3 | 2 | 3 | 50 |
| 2023 | 25 | 14 | 3 | 7 | 1 | 50 |

From 1915 to 1974, Darlington was a county borough, independent of any county council. Under the Local Government Act 1972 it had its territory enlarged and became a non-metropolitan district, with Durham County Council providing county-level services. The first election to the reconstituted borough council was held in 1973, initially operating as a shadow authority before coming into its revised powers on 1 April 1974. On 1 April 1997 the district became a unitary authority, regaining its independence from Durham County Council. Political control of the council since 1973 has been held by the following parties:

Non-metropolitan district

| Party in control | Years |
|---|---|
| Labour | 1973–1976 |
| Conservative | 1976–1979 |
| Labour | 1979–1987 |
| No overall control | 1987–1991 |
| Labour | 1991–1997 |

Unitary authority

| Party in control | Years |
|---|---|
| Labour | 1997–2019 |
| No overall control | 2019–present |

=== Leadership ===
The leaders of the council since 1991 have been:

| Councillor | Party | From | To |
|---|---|---|---|
| John Williams | Labour | 1991 | 8 May 2011 |
| Bill Dixon | Labour | 19 May 2011 | 19 Jul 2018 |
| Steve Harker | Labour | 19 Jul 2018 | 23 May 2019 |
| Heather Scott | Conservative | 23 May 2019 | 19 May 2022 |
| Jonathan Dulston | Conservative | 19 May 2022 | 4 May 2023 |
| Steve Harker | Labour | 4 May 2023 | |

== Council elections ==
=== Non-metropolitan district elections ===
- 1973 Darlington Borough Council election
- 1976 Darlington Borough Council election (Borough boundary changes took place but the number of seats remained the same)
- 1979 Darlington Borough Council election (New ward boundaries)
- 1983 Darlington Borough Council election
- 1987 Darlington Borough Council election
- 1991 Darlington Borough Council election (Borough boundary changes took place but the number of seats remained the same)

=== Unitary authority elections ===
- 1996 Darlington Borough Council election
- 1999 Darlington Borough Council election
- 2003 Darlington Borough Council election (New ward boundaries)
- 2007 Darlington Borough Council election
- 2011 Darlington Borough Council election
- 2015 Darlington Borough Council election (New ward boundaries)
- 2019 Darlington Borough Council election
- 2023 Darlington Borough Council election

== Results maps ==
2003 results map

2007 results map

2011 results map

2015 results map

2019 results map

2023 results map

== By-election results ==
=== 1996–1999 ===
Park East By-Election 1 May 1997
| Party | Candidate | Votes | % | ±% |
|---|---|---|---|---|
| Labour | | 1,844 | 74.0 | −7.4 |
| Conservative | | 648 | 26.0 | +7.4 |
| Majority | | 1,196 | 48.0 | |
| Turnout | | 2,492 | | |
| Labour hold | | Swing | | |

Haughton East By-Election 22 May 1997
| Party | Candidate | Votes | % | ±% |
|---|---|---|---|---|
| Labour | | 836 | 72.6 | |
| Conservative | | 315 | 27.4 | |
| Majority | | 521 | 45.2 | |
| Turnout | | 1,151 | | |
| Labour hold | | Swing | | |

North Road By-Election 13 November 1997
| Party | Candidate | Votes | % | ±% |
|---|---|---|---|---|
| Liberal Democrats | | 471 | 53.6 | −4.4 |
| Labour | | 326 | 37.1 | −4.9 |
| Conservative | | 81 | 9.2 | +9.2 |
| Majority | | 145 | 16.5 | |
| Turnout | | 878 | | |
| Liberal Democrats hold | | Swing | | |

=== 1999–2003 ===
Cockerton East By-Election 21 September 2000
| Party | Candidate | Votes | % | ±% |
|---|---|---|---|---|
| Labour | | 365 | 38.3 | −24.8 |
| Conservative | | 331 | 34.7 | +11.3 |
| Liberal Democrats | | 245 | 19.5 | +19.5 |
| BNP | | 44 | 4.6 | +4.6 |
| Independent | | 28 | 2.9 | −10.5 |
| Majority | | 34 | 3.6 | |
| Turnout | | 1,013 | | |
| Labour hold | | Swing | | |

=== 2003–2007 ===
North Road By-Election 19 August 2004
| Party | Candidate | Votes | % | ±% |
|---|---|---|---|---|
| Liberal Democrats | Frederick Lawton | 789 | 48.5 | +3.6 |
| Labour | Jenny Chapman | 571 | 35.1 | −3.0 |
| Conservative | Ian Galletley | 119 | 7.3 | −2.5 |
| BNP | Nigel Nevison | 87 | 5.3 | −1.9 |
| UKIP | Edward Davies | 61 | 3.7 | +3.7 |
| Majority | | 218 | 13.4 | |
| Turnout | | 1,627 | 38.8 | |
| Liberal Democrats hold | | Swing | | |

Hurworth By-Election 8 September 2005
| Party | Candidate | Votes | % | ±% |
|---|---|---|---|---|
| Liberal Democrats | Martin Swainston | 527 | 42.2 | +42.2 |
| Conservative | George Lawman | 379 | 30.4 | −48.0 |
| Independent | Julie Jones | 297 | 23.8 | +23.8 |
| Labour | Amanda McEwan | 45 | 3.6 | −7.2 |
| Majority | | 148 | 2.2 | |
| Turnout | | 1,248 | 44.2 | |
| Liberal Democrats gain from Conservative | | Swing | | |

College By-Election 2 March 2006
| Party | Candidate | Votes | % | ±% |
|---|---|---|---|---|
| Conservative | Ian Galletley | 624 | 47.6 | −9.7 |
| Liberal Democrats | Garry Hinton | 511 | 39.0 | +17.8 |
| Labour | Elaine Hope | 175 | 13.4 | −8.1 |
| Majority | | 113 | 8.6 | |
| Turnout | | 1,310 | 42.8 | |
| Conservative hold | | Swing | | |

=== 2007–2011 ===
North Road By-Election 13 November 2008
| Party | Candidate | Votes | % | ±% |
|---|---|---|---|---|
| Liberal Democrats | Anne-Marie Curry | 561 | 50.8 | −4.1 |
| Labour | John Vasey | 262 | 23.7 | +0.0 |
| Conservative | George Jenkinson | 115 | 10.4 | −1.0 |
| BNP | John Hoodless | 106 | 9.6 | −0.3 |
| Independent | Stephen Jones | 60 | 5.4 | +5.4 |
| Majority | | 299 | 27.1 | |
| Turnout | | 1,104 | 24.2 | |
| Liberal Democrats hold | | Swing | | |

Cockerton West By-Election 8 July 2010
| Party | Candidate | Votes | % | ±% |
|---|---|---|---|---|
| Labour | Jan Cossins | 388 | 45.1 | +4.0 |
| Liberal Democrats | Brian Jefferson | 347 | 40.3 | +19.4 |
| Conservative | David Davies | 84 | 9.8 | −14.8 |
| BNP | Paul Thompson | 41 | 4.8 | −8.6 |
| Majority | | 41 | 4.8 | |
| Turnout | | 860 | 29.3 | |
| Labour hold | | Swing | | |

=== 2011–2015 ===
Harrowgate Hill By-Election 12 April 2012
| Party | Candidate | Votes | % | ±% |
|---|---|---|---|---|
| Conservative | Gillian Cartwright | 694 | 43.8 | +3.2 |
| Labour | Helen Crumbie | 607 | 38.3 | −21.1 |
| Liberal Democrats | Hilary Allen | 142 | 9.0 | +9.0 |
| UKIP | Daniel Phillip Fairclough | 95 | 6.0 | +6.0 |
| England First | Paul Thompson | 47 | 3.0 | +3.0 |
| Majority | | 87 | 5.5 | |
| Turnout | | 1,585 | 33.8 | |
| Conservative gain from Labour | | Swing | | |

Hurworth By-Election 12 April 2012
| Party | Candidate | Votes | % | ±% |
|---|---|---|---|---|
| Liberal Democrats | Martin Swainson | 474 | 43.7 | −12.9 |
| Conservative | Christopher Brownbridge | 436 | 40.2 | +7.9 |
| Labour | Stephen Rose | 144 | 13.3 | +2.1 |
| UKIP | David Davies | 31 | 2.9 | +2.9 |
| Majority | | 38 | 3.5 | |
| Turnout | | 1,085 | 36.5 | |
| Liberal Democrats hold | | Swing | | |

Lascelles By-Election 11 April 2013
| Party | Candidate | Votes | % | ±% |
|---|---|---|---|---|
| Labour | Helen Crumbie | 426 | 63.4 | −5.0 |
| Liberal Democrats | Howard Jones | 129 | 19.2 | +19.2 |
| Conservative | Lewis Cairns | 117 | 17.4 | −14.2 |
| Majority | | 297 | 44.2 | |
| Turnout | | 672 | 22.6 | |
| Labour hold | | Swing | | |

Mowden By-Election 22 May 2014
| Party | Candidate | Votes | % | ±% |
|---|---|---|---|---|
| Conservative | Pauline Culley | 647 | 40.7 | −28.1 |
| Labour | Jackie Saint | 614 | 38.6 | +7.5 |
| UKIP | Charlotte Bull | 235 | 14.8 | +14.8 |
| Liberal Democrats | Hilary Allen | 93 | 5.9 | +5.9 |
| Majority | | 33 | 2.1 | |
| Turnout | | 1,589 | 51.8 | |
| Conservative hold | | Swing | | |

=== 2015–2019 ===
Mowden By-Election 16 November 2017
| Party | Candidate | Votes | % | ±% |
|---|---|---|---|---|
| Conservative | Alan Marshall | 652 | 60.7 | +14.4 |
| Labour | Edwin Heslop | 285 | 26.5 | −5.0 |
| Liberal Democrats | Sarah Jordan | 111 | 10.3 | n/a |
| Green | Kathryn Barley | 26 | 2.4 | −4.9 |
| Majority | | 367 | 34.2 | |
| Turnout | | 1,074 | 33.7 | |
| Conservative hold | | Swing | | |

Red Hall and Lingfield By-Election 16 November 2017
| Party | Candidate | Votes | % | ±% |
|---|---|---|---|---|
| Labour | Sharifah Rahman | 249 | 44.8 | −1.9 |
| Conservative | Jonathan Dulston | 230 | 41.4 | +12.4 |
| Independent | Kevin Brack | 46 | 8.3 | n/a |
| Green | Michael McTimoney | 20 | 3.6 | −8.9 |
| Liberal Democrats | Harry Longmoor | 11 | 2.0 | −9.9 |
| Majority | | 19 | 3.4 | |
| Turnout | | 556 | 19.5 | |
| Labour hold | | Swing | | |

Cockerton By-Election 12 July 2018
| Party | Candidate | Votes | % | ±% |
|---|---|---|---|---|
| Labour | Edwin Heslop | 555 | 51.0 | +7.9 |
| Conservative | Scott Durham | 239 | 22.0 | −2.8 |
| Liberal Democrats | Charlotte Curry | 104 | 9.6 | −5.5 |
| Independent | Joel Wilks | 93 | 8.5 | n/a |
| For Britain | Kevin Brack | 63 | 5.8 | n/a |
| Green | Terri Hankinson | 34 | 3.1 | −14.0 |
| Majority | | 316 | 29.0 | |
| Turnout | | 1,088 | 23.0 | |
| Labour hold | | Swing | | |

=== 2019–2023 ===
Hummersknott By-Election 6 May 2021
| Party | Candidate | Votes | % | ±% |
|---|---|---|---|---|
| Conservative | Jack Sowerby | 971 | 49.9 | +4.7 |
| Green | Thomas Robinson | 809 | 41.6 | +24.4 |
| Labour | John Sloss | 120 | 6.2 | −5.7 |
| Liberal Democrats | Vicky Atkinson | 32 | 1.6 | +1.6 |
| For Britain | Monty Brack | 14 | 0.7 | +0.7 |
| Majority | | 162 | 8.3 | |
| Turnout | | 1,946 | | |
| Conservative hold | | Swing | | |

Red Hall and Lingfield By-Election 6 May 2021
| Party | Candidate | Votes | % | ±% |
|---|---|---|---|---|
| Conservative | David Willis | 466 | 42.2 | +10.4 |
| Labour | Mandy Porter | 360 | 32.6 | −13.6 |
| Independent | Cheryl Pattison | 201 | 18.2 | +18.2 |
| Green | Mike McTimoney | 38 | 3.4 | −18.6 |
| Liberal Democrats | Scott Wood | 27 | 2.4 | +2.4 |
| For Britain | Janys Gandy | 11 | 1.0 | +1.0 |
| Majority | | 106 | 9.6 | |
| Turnout | | 1,103 | | |
| Conservative gain from Labour | | Swing | | |

=== 2023–2027 ===
Red Hall and Lingfield By-Election 11 December 2025
| Party | Candidate | Votes | % | ±% |
|---|---|---|---|---|
| Reform | Michael Walker | 341 | 37.7 | |
| Conservative | Kyle Bartch | 157 | 17.3 | |
| Liberal Democrats | Simon Thorley | 157 | 17.3 | |
| Labour | Jonnie Vasey | 152 | 16.8 | |
| Green | Louise Maddison | 89 | 9.8 | |
| Independent | Monty Brack | 9 | 1.0 | |
| Majority | | 184 | 20.3 | |
| Turnout | | 905 | | |
| Reform gain from Labour | | Swing | | |
