= Middleton, County Durham =

Middleton, County Durham, may refer to several places in County Durham, England:

- Middleton, Hartlepool, a town in Hartlepool
- Middleton-in-Teesdale, a small market town situated on the north side of Teesdale
- Middleton One Row, a village in the borough of Darlington
- Middleton St George, a village in the borough of Darlington
