= Brafferton =

Brafferton could be

- Brafferton, County Durham, England
- Brafferton, North Yorkshire, England
- Brafferton (building), part of Ancient Campus at the College of William and Mary, Williamsburg, Virginia
