= Killerby =

Killerby may refer to:

- Killerby, County Durham, England
- Killerby, North Yorkshire, England
- Killerby, a hamlet in the parish of Cayton, North Yorkshire, England
