= 2019 Darlington Borough Council election =

2019 UK local government election

- 2 May 2019

All 50 seats to Darlington Borough Council 26 seats needed for a majority

	First party	Second party	Third party
Party	Conservative	Labour	Independent
Last election	17 seats, 34.3%	29 seats, 43.6%	1 seat, 2.7%
Seats won	22	20	3
Seat change	▲5	▼9	▲2
Popular vote	23,859	19,104	3,173
Percentage	41.5%	33.2%	6.6%
Swing	▲7.2%	▼10.4%	▲3.9%
	Fourth party	Fifth party
Party	Liberal Democrats	Green
Last election	3 seats, 7.8%	0 seats, 8.1%
Seats won	3	2
Seat change	0	▲2
Popular vote	2,441	7,584
Percentage	4.2%	13.2%
Swing	▼3.6%	▲5.1%
- Map of the results
Council control before election
Labour
Council control after election
No overall control

The 2019 Darlington Borough Council election took place on 2 May 2019 to elect members of the Darlington Borough Council in England. It was held on the same day as other local elections.

== Summary ==
=== Election result ===
2019 Darlington Borough Council election
Party	Candidates	Seats	Gains	Losses	Net gain/loss	Seats %	Votes %	Votes	+/−
Conservative	46	22	7	2	▲5	44.0	41.5	23,859	+7.2
Labour	50	20	0	9	▼9	40.0	33.2	19,104	–10.4
Independent	7	3	2	0	▲2	6.0	6.6	3,173	+3.9
Liberal Democrats	8	3	1	1	Steady	6.0	4.2	2,441	–3.6
Green	22	2	2	0	▲2	4.0	13.2	7,584	+5.1
UKIP	2	0	0	0	0	0.0	0.7	429	–2.7
For Britain	3	0	0	0	0	0.0	0.6	362	New

== Ward results ==
=== Bank Top & Lascelles ===
Bank Top & Lascelles (3 seats)
Party	Candidate	Votes	%	±%
Independent	Darrien Wright	602	52.3	New
Labour	Helen Crumbie	421	36.6	
Labour	Maureen Newall	419	36.4	
Labour	Mandy Porter	368	32.0	
Independent	David Williams	276	24.0	
Conservative	Robert Mills	267	23.2	
Conservative	Simon Nicholson	263	22.9	
Green	Kevin Lewis	256	22.3	
Majority		51	4.4	
Registered electors		4,649		
Turnout		1,154	24.82	
Rejected ballots		4	0.3	
Independent gain from Labour		Swing		
Labour hold		Swing		
Labour hold		Swing		

=== Brinkburn & Faverdale ===
Brinkburn & Faverdale (3 seats)
Party	Candidate	Votes	%	±%
Conservative	Scott Durham	671	46.4	
Conservative	Rachel Mills	642	44.4	
Conservative	Valerie Preston	575	39.7	
Labour	Michael Adams	465	32.1	
Labour	Jonathan Vasey	440	30.4	
Labour	Elizabeth Watson	432	29.9	
Green	Terri Hankinson	322	22.3	
For Britain	Michael Joyce	145	10.0	New
Majority		110	7.6	
Registered electors		4,742		
Turnout		1,461	30.81	
Rejected ballots		14	1.0	
Conservative hold		Swing		
Conservative gain from Labour		Swing		
Conservative hold		Swing		

=== Cockerton ===
Cockerton (3 seats)
Party	Candidate	Votes	%	±%
Labour	Janet Cossins	549	44.6	
Labour	Paul Baldwin	526	42.8	
Labour	Edwin Heslop	479	38.9	
Conservative	John Bell	451	36.7	
Conservative	Jack Sowerby	372	30.2	
Conservative	Margaret Donoghue	371	30.2	
Green	Ty Hankinson	259	21.1	
Liberal Democrats	Charlotte Curry	144	11.7	
Majority		28	2.3	
Registered electors		4,698		
Turnout		1,249	26.59	
Rejected ballots		19	1.5	
Labour hold		Swing		
Labour hold		Swing		
Labour hold		Swing		

=== College ===
College (2 seats)
Party	Candidate	Votes	%	±%
Green	Matthew Snedker	944	54.0	
Green	Bryony Holroyd	788	45.1	
Conservative	Ian Galletley	717	41.0	
Conservative	Nigel Kendrew	575	32.9	
Labour	Susan Richmond	189	10.8	
Labour	Anna Wilson	168	9.6	
Majority		71	4.1	
Registered electors		3,379		
Turnout		1,757	52.0	
Rejected ballots		9	0.5	
Green gain from Conservative		Swing		
Green gain from Conservative		Swing		

=== Eastbourne ===
Eastbourne (3 seats)
Party	Candidate	Votes	%	±%
Independent	Kevin Nicholson	1,046	71.2	
Independent	Steven Tait	917	62.4	
Conservative	Jonathan Dulston	541	36.8	
Green	Richard Wise	336	22.9	
Labour	David Beckett	325	22.1	
Labour	James Garner	306	20.8	
Labour	James McGill	283	19.3	
Majority		205	14.0	
Registered electors		4,942		
Turnout		1,473	29.81	
Rejected ballots		4	0.3	
Independent hold		Swing		
Independent gain from Labour		Swing		
Conservative gain from Labour		Swing		

=== Harrowgate Hill ===
Harrowgate Hill (3 seats)
Party	Candidate	Votes	%	±%
Conservative	Ian Bell	658	40.4	
Conservative	Jonathan Clarke	647	39.7	
Labour	Lynn Paley	612	37.6	
Labour	Martin Landers	598	36.7	
Conservative	John Evans	597	36.7	
Labour	John Vasey	547	33.6	
Green	Christopher Brown	367	22.5	
Independent	Ian Ferguson	333	20.5	New
Majority		14	0.9	
Registered electors		4,853		
Turnout		1,637	33.73	
Rejected ballots		9	0.5	
Conservative hold		Swing		
Conservative gain from Labour		Swing		
Labour hold		Swing		

=== Haughton & Springfield ===
Haughton & Springfield (3 seats)
Party	Candidate	Votes	%	±%
Labour	Christopher McEwan	669	46.1	
Labour	Andrew Scott	652	44.9	
Labour	Nicholas Wallis	590	40.6	
Conservative	Paul Culley	566	39.0	
Conservative	David Willis	480	33.1	
Conservative	Patricia Tobin	477	32.9	
Green	Michael McTimoney	325	22.4	
Majority		24	1.7	
Registered electors		4,857		
Turnout		1,468	30.22	
Rejected ballots		16	1.1	
Labour hold		Swing		
Labour hold		Swing		
Labour hold		Swing		

=== Heighington & Coniscliffe ===
Heighington & Coniscliffe (2 seats)
Party	Candidate	Votes	%	±%
Conservative	Gerald Lee	879	70.1	
Conservative	Paul Crudass	734	58.5	
Green	Helen Kinch	270	21.5	
Labour	Ben Hall	172	13.7	
Labour	Elizabeth Muggleton	171	13.6	
Majority		464	37.0	
Registered electors		3,405		
Turnout		1,262	37.06	
Rejected ballots		8	0.6	
Conservative hold		Swing		
Conservative hold		Swing		

=== Hummersknott ===
Hummersknott (2 seats)
Party	Candidate	Votes	%	±%
Conservative	Charles Johnson	714	55.1	
Conservative	Paul Howell	672	51.9	
Independent	Alan Coultas	405	31.3	New
Green	Kathryn Barley	272	21.0	
Labour	Gareth Robson	188	14.5	
Labour	Ryan Ward	145	11.2	
Majority		267	20.6	
Registered electors		3,081		
Turnout		1,300	42.19	
Rejected ballots		4	0.3	
Conservative hold		Swing		
Conservative hold		Swing		

=== Hurworth ===
Hurworth (2 seats)
Party	Candidate	Votes	%	±%
Conservative	Lorraine Tostevin	556	51.1	
Conservative	Christy Chou	489	44.9	
Liberal Democrats	Scott Wood	373	34.3	
Green	Richard Lawley	338	31.0	
Labour	Rosie Dixon	122	11.2	
Labour	Rebecca Taylor	111	10.2	
Majority		116	10.7	
Registered electors		2,891		
Turnout		1,102	38.12	
Rejected ballots		13	1.2	
Conservative hold		Swing		
Conservative gain from Liberal Democrats		Swing		

=== Mowden ===
Mowden (2 seats)
Party	Candidate	Votes	%	±%
Conservative	Pauline Culley	818	62.7	
Conservative	Alan Marshall	783	60.0	
Green	Michael Cooke	276	21.1	
Labour	Dorothy Long	265	20.3	
Labour	Elaine Hope	258	19.8	
Majority		507	38.9	
Registered electors		3,164		
Turnout		1,313	41.5	
Rejected ballots		8	0.6	
Conservative hold		Swing		
Conservative hold		Swing		

=== North Road ===
North Road (3 seats)
Party	Candidate	Votes	%	±%
Liberal Democrats	Anne-Marie Curry	562	46.8	
Liberal Democrats	Hilary Allen	501	41.7	
Liberal Democrats	Nigel Boddy	412	34.3	
Labour	Dawn Storr	352	29.3	
Labour	Mark Barron	309	25.7	
Labour	Louise Graham	285	23.7	
UKIP	Graham Smurthwaite	205	17.1	
Green	Anna-Maria Thain	169	14.1	
Conservative	Emma Huscroft	137	11.4	
Conservative	Louise Heaps	128	10.7	
Conservative	Janet Galletley	121	10.1	
Majority		60	5.0	
Registered electors		4,347		
Turnout		1,211	27.85	
Rejected ballots		10	0.8	
Liberal Democrats hold		Swing		
Liberal Democrats hold		Swing		
Liberal Democrats gain from Labour		Swing		

=== Northgate ===
Northgate (2 seats)
Party	Candidate	Votes	%	±%
Labour	Syeda Miah	387	52.4	
Labour	Eleanor Lister	364	49.3	
Conservative	Hayley Gilbert	164	22.2	
Green	Neil Kang-Scarth	133	18.0	
Conservative	Christine Taylor	129	17.5	
For Britain	Frazer Spence	83	11.2	New
Majority		200	27.1	
Registered electors		2,579		
Turnout		746	28.93	
Rejected ballots		8	1.1	
Labour hold		Swing		
Labour hold		Swing		

=== Park East ===
Park East (3 seats)
Party	Candidate	Votes	%	±%
Labour	Cynthia Hughes	567	44.9	
Labour	Elizabeth McCollom	556	44.1	
Labour	Michael Nicholson	474	37.6	
Green	Jonathan Barley	276	21.9	
Conservative	Mark Askew	255	20.2	
Conservative	Carol Johnson	250	19.8	
Conservative	Andrew Wattsford	227	18.0	
UKIP	Leigh Porter	224	17.7	
Liberal Democrats	Lynda Daynes	199	15.8	
Liberal Democrats	William Lawrie	143	11.3	
For Britain	Kevin Brack	134	10.6	New
Liberal Democrats	Norman Webber	107	8.5	
Majority		198	15.7	
Registered electors		4,934		
Turnout		1,266	25.65	
Rejected ballots		4	0.3	
Labour hold		Swing		
Labour hold		Swing		
Labour hold		Swing		

=== Park West ===
Park West (2 seats)
Party	Candidate	Votes	%	±%
Conservative	Heather Scott	719	46.7	
Conservative	Robert Donoghue	673	43.7	
Green	Martin Wood	543	35.3	
Green	Louise Maddison	477	31.0	
Labour	Kim Baldwin	286	18.6	
Labour	James Hughes	285	18.5	
Majority		130	8.4	
Registered electors		3,441		
Turnout		1,550	45.05	
Rejected ballots		11	0.7	
Conservative hold		Swing		
Conservative hold		Swing		

=== Pierremont ===
Pierremont (3 seats)
Party	Candidate	Votes	%	±%
Labour	Stephen Harker	704	50.0	
Labour	Linda Hughes	659	46.8	
Labour	Maryclaire Layton	628	44.6	
Conservative	Joanne Barker	453	32.2	
Conservative	Philip Bale	441	31.3	
Conservative	Margaret Kendrew	374	26.6	
Green	Michael Chapman	331	23.5	
Independent	David Davies	196	13.9	New
Majority		175	12.4	
Registered electors		4,216		
Turnout		1,426	33.82	
Rejected ballots		18	1.3	
Labour hold		Swing		
Labour hold		Swing		
Labour hold		Swing		

=== Red Hall & Lingfield ===
Red Hall & Lingfield (2 seats)
Party	Candidate	Votes	%	±%
Labour	Sam Howarth	373	48.3	
Labour	Hilary Lucas	350	45.3	
Conservative	Geoffrey Bartch	257	33.3	
Conservative	Kyle Bartch	242	31.3	
Green	Francesca Wood	178	23.1	
Majority		93	12.0	
Registered electors		3,048		
Turnout		782	25.66	
Rejected ballots		10	1.3	
Labour hold		Swing		
Labour hold		Swing		

=== Sadberge & Middleton St. George ===
Sadberge & Middleton St. George (3 seats)
Party	Candidate	Votes	%	±%
Conservative	Brian Jones	1,055	71.9	
Conservative	Doris Jones	1,047	71.4	
Conservative	Deborah Laing	907	61.8	
Labour	John Crowther	334	22.8	
Green	Peter Commane	332	22.6	
Labour	Barbara Beacher	230	15.7	
Labour	Sandra Thorne-Wallis	220	15.0	
Majority		573	36.6	
Registered electors		4,865		
Turnout		1,581	32.5	
Rejected ballots		14	0.9	
Conservative hold		Swing		
Conservative hold		Swing		
Conservative hold		Swing		

=== Stephenson ===
Stephenson (2 seats)
Party	Candidate	Votes	%	±%
Conservative	Michael Renton	400	53.3	
Labour	Ian Haszeldine	270	36.0	
Labour	Sonia Kane	264	35.2	
Green	Lucy Chapman	207	27.6	
Majority		6	0.8	
Registered electors		2,939		
Turnout		758	25.79	
Rejected ballots		8	1.1	
Conservative gain from Labour		Swing		
Labour hold		Swing		

=== Whinfield ===
Whinfield (2 seats)
Party	Candidate	Votes	%	±%
Conservative	Jamie Bartch	683	55.0	
Conservative	Andrew Keir	682	54.9	
Labour	Amanda McEwan	384	30.9	
Labour	Lily Vasey	353	28.4	
Green	Brian Tudor	185	14.9	
Majority		298	24.0	
Registered electors		3,125		
Turnout		1,258	40.26	
Rejected ballots		16	1.3	
Conservative gain from Labour		Swing		
Conservative gain from Labour		Swing		

== Changes 2019–2023 ==
- Paul Baldwin (Labour, Cockerton) left the party to sit as an independent between January and March 2020.
- Lynn Paley (Labour, Harrowgate Hill) left the party to sit as an independent between July and September 2021.
- Ian Bell (Conservative, Harrowgate Hill) left the party to sit as an independent in early 2023, having still been listed as a Conservative councillor in the March 2023 edition of the council's own newsletter.

=== By-elections ===
==== Hummersknott ====
Following the resignation of Councillor Paul Howell, a by-election was held on 6 May 2021.

Hummersknott: 6 May 2021
Party	Candidate	Votes	%	±%
Conservative	Jack Sowerby	971	49.9	+4.7
Green	Thomas Robinson	809	41.6	+24.4
Labour	John Sloss	120	6.2	−5.7
Liberal Democrats	Vicky Atkinson	32	1.6	N/A
For Britain	Monty Brack	14	0.7	N/A
Majority		162	8.3	
Registered electors		3,115		
Turnout		1,951	62.63	
Rejected ballots		5	0.26	
Conservative hold		Swing	▼9.9	

==== Red Hall & Lingfield ====
Following the resignation of Councillor Sam Howarth, a by-election was held on 6 May 2021.

Red Hall and Lingfield: 6 May 2021
Party	Candidate	Votes	%	±%
Conservative	David Willis	466	42.0	
Labour	Mandy Porter	360	32.5	
Independent	Cheryl Rimmer	201	18.1	
Green	Michael McTimoney	38	3.4	
Liberal Democrats	Scott Wood	27	2.4	
For Britain	Janice Gandy	11	1.0	
Majority		106	9.6	
Registered electors		3,266		
Turnout		1,109	33.99	
Rejected ballots		6	0.5	
Conservative gain from Labour		Swing		
