= Houghton Bank =

Coordinates: 54.600°N 1.650°W

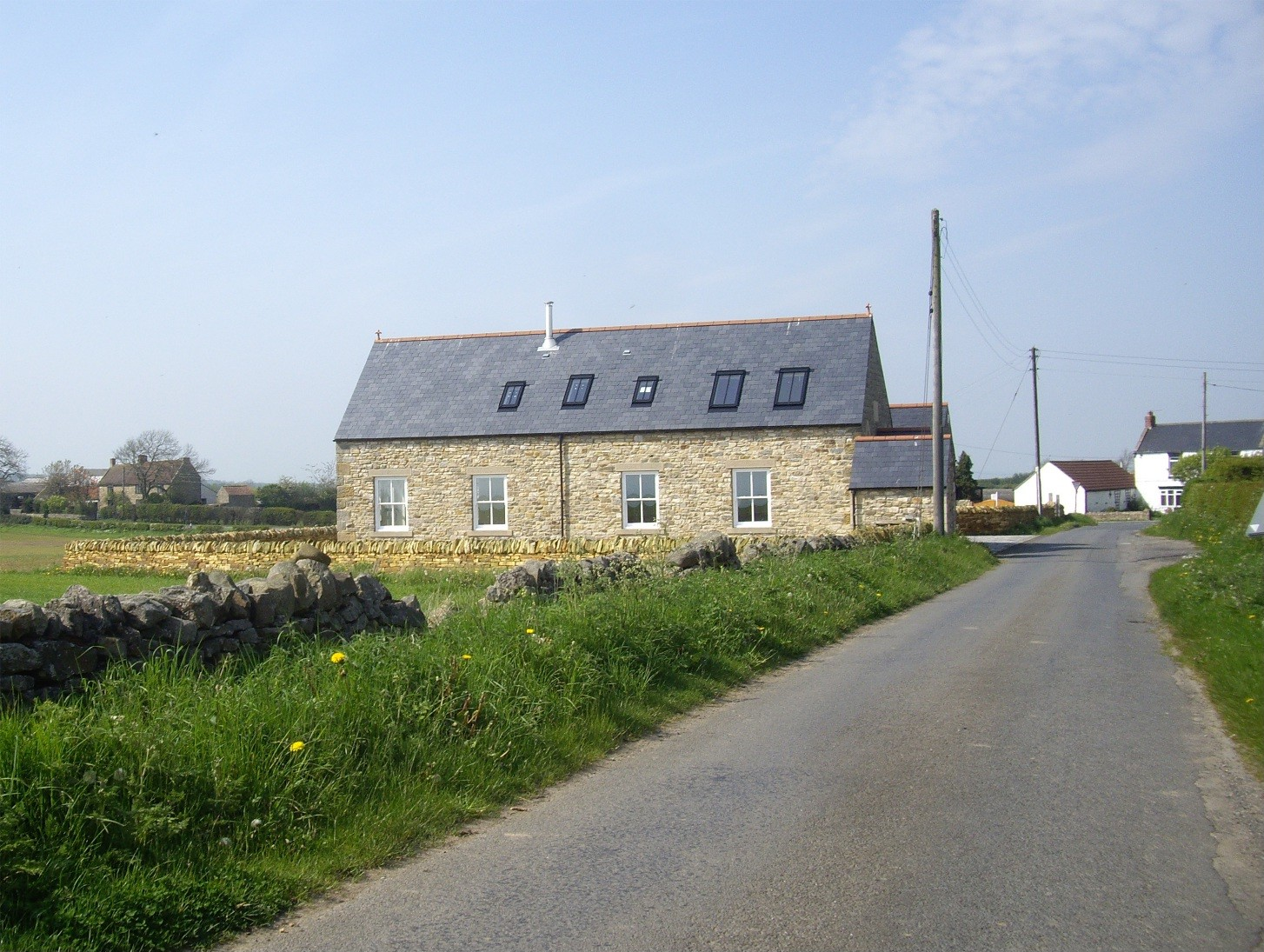
- Chapel House on Houghton Bank Lane

- Location within County Durham
- Civil parish: Houghton Le Side; Heighington
- Unitary authority: Darlington
- Ceremonial county: Durham
- Region: North East
- Country: England
- Sovereign state: United Kingdom
- Police: Durham
- Fire: County Durham and Darlington
- Ambulance: North East

Houghton Bank is a hamlet in civil parishes of Houghton Le Side and Heighington, in the borough of Darlington and the ceremonial county of County Durham, England. It is situated a few miles west of Newton Aycliffe, on the A68 between Darlington and Bishop Auckland.
