= 2011 Darlington Borough Council election =

2011 UK local government election

Results of the 2011 Darlington Borough Council election

The 2011 Darlington Borough Council election was held on Thursday 5 May 2011 to elect all 53 members of the Darlington Borough Council to a four-year term. Labour held control of the council after the election. The total turnout across the council was 41%.

== Results summary ==
2011 Darlington Borough Council election
Party	Seats	Net gain/loss	Seats %	Votes %	Votes	+/−
Labour	34	▲5	64.2			
Conservative	14	▼4	26.4			
Liberal Democrats	5	▼1	9.4			
Independent	0	Steady	0.0			
England First	0	New	0.0			

== Ward results ==
=== Bank Top ===
Bank Top (2 seats)
Party	Candidate	Votes	%	±%
Labour	Veronica Copeland*	603		
Labour	Chris Taylor	464		
Conservative	Simon Nicholson	216		
Conservative	Stanley Johnson	207		
Liberal Democrats	Albert Oates	73		
Liberal Democrats	Myrtle Oates	67		
Turnout		902	33.3	
Registered electors		2,712		
Labour hold				
Labour hold				

=== Central ===
Central (2 seats)
Party	Candidate	Votes	%	±%
Labour	Jan Taylor	488		
Labour	Malcolm Wright	444		
Conservative	David Davies	257		
Liberal Democrats	Hilary Allen	178		
Liberal Democrats	Paul Bennett	149		
Turnout		932	33.1	
Registered electors		2,819		
Labour hold				
Labour hold				

=== Cockerton East ===
Cockerton East (3 seats)
Party	Candidate	Votes	%	±%
Labour	Bryan Thistlethwhaite*	879		
Labour	Sue Richmond	810		
Labour	Paul Baldwin*	808		
Conservative	Alice Park	620		
Conservative	Steven Shaw	599		
Conservative	Alexandra Nicholson*	596		
Independent	Gary Aislabie	125		
Turnout		1,702	41.5	
Registered electors		4,102		
Labour hold				
Labour gain from Conservative				
Labour hold				

=== Cockerton West ===
Cockerton West (2 seats)
Party	Candidate	Votes	%	±%
Labour	Jan Cossins* (Note: Cossins was elected in the 8 July 2010 by-election following the resignation of Jenny Chapman.)	686		
Labour	David Regan*	632		
Conservative	Lauren Costin	245		
Conservative	Andrew Wattsford	238		
Turnout		995	33.9	
Registered electors		2,935		
Labour hold				
Labour hold				

=== College ===
College (2 seats)
Party	Candidate	Votes	%	±%
Conservative	Ian Galletley*	1,064		
Conservative	Tony Richmond*	1,024		
Labour	Elaine Hope	613		
Labour	Martin Wood	573		
Turnout		1,781	54.9	
Registered electors		3,246		
Conservative hold				
Conservative hold				

=== Eastbourne ===
Eastbourne (3 seats)
Party	Candidate	Votes	%	±%
Labour	Roddy Francis*	839		
Labour	Bill Dixon*	714		
Labour	Lee Vasey*	652		
Independent	Kevin Nicholson	423		
Conservative	Charles Beckham	383		
Conservative	Doreen Tucker	338		
Conservative	Marjorie Roberts	276		
Liberal Democrats	Gordon Bean	107		
Liberal Democrats	Charles Oliver	71		
Liberal Democrats	Joe Hackett	64		
Turnout		1,559	33.5	
Registered electors		4,659		
Labour hold				
Labour hold				
Labour hold				

=== Faverdale ===
Faverdale (1 seat)
Party	Candidate	Votes	%	±%
Conservative	Richard Grundy	387	53.5	▼21.8
Labour	Rosie Dixon	337	46.5	▲21.8
Majority		50	6.9	▼43.6
Total valid votes		724	99.3	
Rejected ballots		5	0.7	
Turnout		729	34.5	
Registered electors		2,110		
Conservative hold		Swing	▼21.8	

=== Harrowgate Hill ===
Harrowgate Hill (3 seats)
Party	Candidate	Votes	%	±%
Labour	Mark Burton*	1,261		
Labour	John Vasey	959		
Labour	Marjory Knowles	910		
Conservative	Gill Cartwright*	863		
Conservative	Ian Ferguson	590		
Conservative	Paul Howell	554		
Turnout		2,005	43.3	
Registered electors		4,635		
Labour hold				
Labour gain from Conservative				
Labour gain from Conservative				

=== Haughton East ===
Haughton East (2 seats)
Party	Candidate	Votes	%	±%
Labour	Martin Landers*	742		
Labour	Chris McEwan	742		
Conservative	Vicky Lloyd	352		
Conservative	Jennifer Hardy	352		
Turnout		1,169	37.9	
Registered electors		3,086		
Labour hold				
Labour hold				

=== Haughton North ===
Haughton North (2 seats)
Party	Candidate	Votes	%	±%
Labour	Bev Hutchinson	747		
Labour	Tom Nutt*	736		
Conservative	Ian Storey	521		
Conservative	Kimberley Summers	440		
Turnout		1,303	47.5	
Registered electors		2,746		
Labour hold				
Labour hold				

=== Haughton West ===
Haughton West (3 seats)
Party	Candidate	Votes	%	±%
Labour	David Lyonette*	996		
Labour	Andrew Scott*	963		
Labour	Nick Wallis*	857		
Conservative	George Jenkinson	462		
Conservative	Louise Armstrong	401		
Independent	Nick Haithwaite	347		
Turnout		1,683	40.8	
Registered electors		4,121		
Labour hold				
Labour hold				
Labour hold				

=== Heighington and Coniscliffe ===
Heighington and Coniscliffe (2 seats)
Party	Candidate	Votes	%	±%
Conservative	Gerald Lee*	1,118		
Conservative	Paul Crudass	861		
Labour	Martin McTague	360		
Labour	Christopher Kelsey	287		
Turnout		1,522	51.7	
Registered electors		2,944		
Conservative hold				
Conservative hold				

=== Hummersknott ===
Hummersknott (2 seats)
Party	Candidate	Votes	%	±%
Conservative	Alan Coultas*	1,006		
Conservative	Charles Johnson*	981		
Labour	Amanda McEwan	384		
Labour	Rebecca Taylor	360		
Liberal Democrats	Geoffrey Hill	190		
Turnout		1,591	54.7	
Registered electors		2,907		
Conservative hold				
Conservative hold				

=== Hurworth ===
Hurworth (2 seats)
Party	Candidate	Votes	%	±%
Liberal Democrats	Martin Swainston*	886		
Liberal Democrats	Joe Kelley	568		
Conservative	Christopher Brownbridge	505		
Conservative	John Howard	386		
Labour	James Garner	175		
Labour	Esther Taylor	175		
Turnout		1,429	49.8	
Registered electors		2,870		
Liberal Democrats hold				
Liberal Democrats hold				

=== Lascelles ===
Lascelles (2 seats)
Party	Candidate	Votes	%	±%
Labour	Jackie Maddison*	599		
Labour	Wendy Newall*	544		
Conservative	Pat Chapman	277		
Turnout		937	32.1	
Registered electors		2,919		
Labour hold				
Labour hold				

=== Lingfield ===
Lingfield (2 seats)
Party	Candidate	Votes	%	±%
Labour	Ian Haszeldine*	576		
Labour	Lynne Haszeldine*	527		
Conservative	Janet Galletley	267		
Conservative	Olivia McPhee	243		
Liberal Democrats	Harry Longmoor	117		
Liberal Democrats	Jean Curry	101		
Turnout		998	34.6	
Registered electors		2,888		
Labour hold				
Labour hold				

=== Middleton St. George ===
Middleton St. George (2 seats)
Party	Candidate	Votes	%	±%
Conservative	Doris Jones*	923		
Conservative	Stephen York*	796		
Labour	Philip Crumbie	289		
Labour	Elizabeth Muggleton	251		
Liberal Democrats	Alex Swainston	208		
Liberal Democrats	Chris Leech	195		
Turnout		1,452	41.6	
Registered electors		3,487		
Conservative hold				
Conservative hold				

=== Mowden ===
Mowden (2 seats)
Party	Candidate	Votes	%	±%
Conservative	Ron Lewis*	1,090		
Conservative	Bill Stenson	992		
Labour	Jackie Saint	629		
Labour	Robert Watson	494		
Turnout		1,680	54.3	
Registered electors		3,094		
Conservative hold				
Conservative hold				

=== North Road ===
North Road (3 seats)
Party	Candidate	Votes	%	±%
Liberal Democrats	Fred Lawton*	717		
Liberal Democrats	Anne-Marie Curry	665		
Liberal Democrats	Alan MacNab	618		
Labour	Michael Nicholson	499		
Labour	Jonnie Vasey	487		
Labour	Mark Wilkes	466		
Conservative	Catherine Parkinson	163		
Conservative	James Moore	159		
Conservative	Craig Smith	152		
Turnout		1,494	34.0	
Registered electors		4,391		
Liberal Democrats hold				
Liberal Democrats hold				
Liberal Democrats hold				

=== Northgate ===
Northgate (2 seats)
Party	Candidate	Votes	%	±%
Labour	Dorothy Long*	579		
Labour	Eleanor Lister*	561		
Conservative	Carol Johnson	208		
Liberal Democrats	Peter Everett	179		
Liberal Democrats	Tom Hodgson	119		
England First	Paul Thompson	74		
Turnout		1,030	35.4	
Registered electors		2,911		
Labour hold				
Labour hold				

=== Park East ===
Park East (3 seats)
Party	Candidate	Votes	%	±%
Labour	Cyndi Hughes*	699		
Labour	Joe Lyonette*	681		
Labour	Paul Harman	669		
Conservative	Nathalie Carter	378		
Conservative	Francis Elliott	360		
Conservative	Nicholas Bilney	342		
Liberal Democrats	Peter Freitag*	214		
Independent	John Monkhouse	176		
Liberal Democrats	Ian Barnes	147		
Liberal Democrats	Adam Baldwin	121		
Turnout		1,435	33.4	
Registered electors		4,296		
Labour hold				
Labour hold				
Labour gain from Liberal Democrats				

=== Park West ===
Park West (2 seats)
Party	Candidate	Votes	%	±%
Conservative	Heather Scott*	1,082		
Conservative	Bob Donoghue	1,028		
Labour	Jack Madden	452		
Labour	James Doran	450		
Turnout		1,710	57.7	
Registered electors		2,966		
Conservative hold				
Conservative hold				

=== Pierremont ===
Pierremont (3 seats)
Party	Candidate	Votes	%	±%
Labour	Steve Harker*	908		
Labour	Linda Hughes	882		
Labour	Bob Carson	864		
Conservative	Tony Brockley	616		
Conservative	Kate Davies*	556		
Conservative	Pauline Culley	509		
Independent	Paul Ripley	208		
Turnout		1,733	42.9	
Registered electors		4,041		
Labour hold				
Labour hold				
Labour gain from Conservative				

=== Sadberge and Whessoe ===
Sadberge and Whessoe (1 seat)
Party	Candidate	Votes	%	±%
Conservative	Brian Jones*	602	77.0	▼4.3
Labour	Sandy Thorne-Wallis	180	23.0	▲4.3
Majority		422	54.0	▼8.7
Total valid votes		782	98.6	
Rejected ballots		11	1.4	
Turnout		793	48.4	
Registered electors		1,637		
Conservative hold		Swing	▼4.3	
