= Coatham Mundeville =

Village in County Durham, England

Coordinates: 54.579°N 1.561°W

- Location within County Durham
- Population: 125 (2011)
- OS grid reference: NZ285205
- Unitary authority: Darlington
- Ceremonial county: County Durham
- Region: North East
- Country: England
- Sovereign state: United Kingdom
- Post town: DARLINGTON
- Postcode district: DL3
- Police: Durham
- Fire: County Durham and Darlington
- Ambulance: North East

Coatham Mundeville is a village in the borough of Darlington and the ceremonial county of County Durham, England. It is situated a short distance from Brafferton, on the A167 between Newton Aycliffe and Darlington.
