= Summerhouse, County Durham =

Village in County Durham, England

Coordinates: 54.567°N 1.688°W

Summerhouse
- Location within County Durham
- Population: 143 (2011)
- OS grid reference: NZ203191
- Unitary authority: Darlington
- Ceremonial county: County Durham
- Region: North East
- Country: England
- Sovereign state: United Kingdom
- Post town: DARLINGTON
- Postcode district: DL2
- Police: Durham
- Fire: County Durham and Darlington
- Ambulance: North East

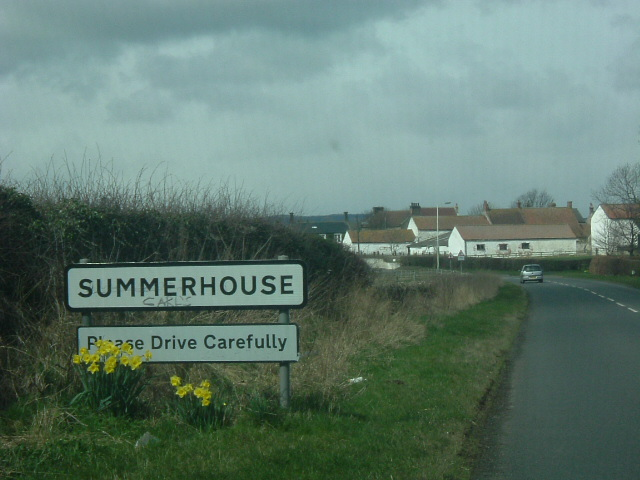

Summerhouse is a village in the borough of Darlington and the ceremonial county of County Durham, England. It is situated a few miles to the north-west of Darlington. Since 2009 it was home of the two Michelin star restaurant The Raby Hunt.

== Demographics ==
The population of the civil parish taken at the 2011 Census was 143.
