= Oak Tree, County Durham =

Village in County Durham, England

Oak Tree is a small village in the borough of Darlington and the ceremonial county of County Durham, England. It is situated between Darlington and Eaglescliffe, north of the River Tees. It has a public house and is close to Teesside International Airport.

== Administration ==
Oak Tree was historically and ceremonially located in County Durham, but for administrative purposes is located in the borough of Darlington (borough), which became a unitary authority on 1 April 1997. Until that date Oak Tree was administered as part of County Durham, along with the rest of the borough, and continues to share police and fire services with the county.

Oak Tree is located in the Middleton St George ward of Darlington, which as of 2005 is represented on the Borough Council by Doris Jones and Bill Maybrey (both Conservative). It is part of the Stockton West parliamentary constituency, which is represented by Matt Vickers (Conservative).

The local police force is Durham Constabulary. Oak Tree is in the Darlington division.

== Geography ==
=== Location ===
- Map sources for Oak Tree, County Durham
- Latitude and longitude: 54°31′N 1°27′W (54.52, −1.45)
- Elevation: 40 m (130 feet)
- Road access: A67 between Darlington and Egglescliffe passes directly to the north
- Rail access: Dinsdale, 2 km (1.2 mi)
- Nearest large village: Middleton St George, 2 km (1.2 mi)
- Nearest town: Darlington, 6 km (3.7 mi)
