= The Raby Hunt =

Restaurant in Summerhouse, County Durham, England

Coordinates: 54.5666°N 1.6895°W

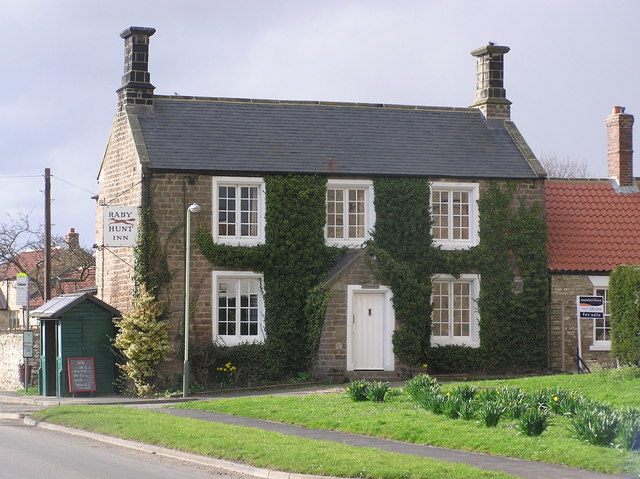
The Raby Hunt

The Raby Hunt was a two Michelin star restaurant located in Summerhouse, County Durham, United Kingdom. Whilst it was housed in a 200-year-old Grade II listed building, the restaurant itself was opened in 2009 as chef James Close's first. It gained its first star in 2012 and its second in 2016, making it (as of January 2019) the only establishment in North East England to reach that status. As it offered overnight accommodation it was classed as a Restaurant with Rooms, the modern equivalent of an inn.

In 2018 it was reported that local residents were objecting to diners and delivery vans blocking the bus stop and side roads and making parking in the area difficult, and complaints were made about owners and staff treating the village "with contempt". Durham Constabulary had been called out repeatedly to the site, but said that on nearly all occasions no parking offences had been committed. They called on the restaurant to defuse the situation.

The Raby Hunt was named in Estrella Damm National Awards the restaurant award in June 2023.

The Raby Hunt closed permanently at the end of January 2024, with chef-owner James Close moving to the nearby 5-star hotel, Rockliffe Hall, to take up a rôle as its culinary director. The restaurant building has now been put up for sale.
