= Easington District Council elections =

Local government elections in County Durham, England

Easington District Council elections were generally held every four years between the council's creation in 1974 and its abolition in 2009. Easington was a non-metropolitan district in County Durham, England. On 1 April 2009 the council's functions passed to Durham County Council, which became a unitary authority.

== Political control ==
The first election to the council was held in 1973, initially operating as a shadow authority before coming into its powers on 1 April 1974. Throughout the council's existence from 1974 to 2009, Labour held a majority of the seats on the council.

Party in control	Years
Labour	1974–2009

=== Leadership ===
The leaders of the council from 1999 until the council's abolition 2009 were:

Councillor	Party	From	To
Derek Thompson	Labour		May 1999
Alan Napier	Labour	1999	2009

== Council elections ==
Election	Labour	Liberal Democrat (Note: Liberal Party prior to 1983, SDP-Liberal Alliance in 1983 and 1987.)	Conservative	Independent	Total	Notes
1973	56	0	0	4 (Note: Including one Independent Labour)	60	
1976	45	4	1	10 (Note: Including five Independent Labour)	60	
1979	33	8	0	10	51	New ward boundaries
1983	34	9 (Note: 7 Liberal, 2 SDP)	0	8 (Note: Including two Independent Labour)	51	
1987	43	3 (Note: 3 Liberal, 0 SDP)	0	5	51	District boundary changes took place but the number of seats remained the same
1991	38	4	0	9 (Note: Including four Independent Labour)	51	
1995	44	3	0	4	51	District boundary changes took place but the number of seats remained the same
1999	45	1	0	5	51	
2003	44	2	0	5	51	New ward boundaries
2007	47	2	0	2	51	

== Results maps ==
2003 results map

2007 results map

== By-election results ==
The following is an incomplete list of by-elections to Easington District Council.

=== 2003-2007 ===
Passfield By-Election 19 October 2006
Party	Candidate	Votes	%	±%
Labour	Donald Milsom	480	69.3	+26.8
Independent	Edward Hall	213	30.7	−26.8
Majority		267	38.6	
Turnout		693	15.2	
Labour gain from Independent		Swing		
