= Sedgefield Borough Council elections =

Local government elections in County Durham, England

Sedgefield Borough Council elections were generally held every four years between the council's creation in 1974 and its abolition in 2009. Sedgefield was a non-metropolitan district in County Durham, England. On 1 April 2009 the council's functions passed to Durham County Council, which became a unitary authority.

== Political control ==
The first election to the council was held in 1973, initially operating as a shadow authority before coming into its powers on 1 April 1974. Throughout the council's existence from 1974 to 2009, Labour held a majority of the seats on the council.

| Party in control | Years |
|---|---|
| Labour | 1974–2009 |

=== Leadership ===
The leaders of the council were:

| Councillor | Party | From | To |
|---|---|---|---|
| Warren McCourt | Labour | 1974 | 1986 |
| Brian Stephens | Labour | 1986 | May 2003 |
| Bob Fleming | Labour | 16 May 2003 | 2007 |
| Agnes Armstrong | Labour | 18 May 2007 | 31 Mar 2009 |

== Council elections ==
| Election | Labour | Liberal Democrat (Note: Liberal Party prior to 1983, SDP-Liberal Alliance in 1983 and 1987.) | Conservative | Independent | Total | Notes |
|---|---|---|---|---|---|---|
| 1973 | 40 | 4 | 1 | 8 | 53 | |
| 1976 | 36 | 1 | 1 | 15 | 53 | District boundary changes took place but the number of seats remained the same |
| 1979 | 40 | 3 | 1 | 9 | 53 | |
| 1983 | 40 | 4 (Note: 0 Liberal, 4 SDP) | 2 | 3 | 49 | New ward boundaries & district boundary changes also took place |
| 1987 | 37 | 7 (Note: 1 Liberal, 6 SDP) | 2 | 3 (Note: Including three Independent Labour) | 49 | District boundary changes took place but the number of seats remained the same |
| 1991 | 33 | 8 | 1 | 7 | 49 | District boundary changes took place but the number of seats remained the same |
| 1995 | 44 | 0 | 0 | 2 | 49 (Note: 3 vacant after election) | |
| 1999 | 43 | 2 | 0 | 4 | 49 | |
| 2003 | 35 | 7 | 1 | 7 | 50 | New ward boundaries |
| 2007 | 28 | 6 | 1 | 15 | 50 | |

== Results maps ==
2003 results map

2007 results map

== By-election results ==
The following is an incomplete list of by-elections to Sedgefield Borough Council.

=== 1995-1999 ===
Tudhoe By-Election 21 November 1996
| Party | Candidate | Votes | % | ±% |
|---|---|---|---|---|
| Labour | | 425 | 55.8 | |
| Independent | | 216 | 28.4 | |
| Liberal Democrats | Benjamin May Ord | 88 | 11.6 | |
| Conservative | | 32 | 4.2 | |
| Majority | | 209 | 27.4 | |
| Turnout | | 761 | 28 | |
| Labour hold | | Swing | | |

=== 1999-2003 ===
Tudhoe By-Election 25 November 1999
| Party | Candidate | Votes | % | ±% |
|---|---|---|---|---|
| Labour | Agnes Armstrong | 373 | 60.2 | |
| Liberal Democrats | Martin Jones | 247 | 39.8 | |
| Majority | | 126 | 20.4 | |
| Turnout | | 620 | 23 | |
| Labour hold | | Swing | | |

Tudhoe By-Election 7 June 2001
| Party | Candidate | Votes | % | ±% |
|---|---|---|---|---|
| Labour | | 1,129 | 52.2 | +5.2 |
| Independent | | 1,033 | 47.8 | −5.2 |
| Majority | | 96 | 4.4 | |
| Turnout | | 2,162 | | |
| Labour gain from Independent | | Swing | | |

Middlestone By-Election 21 March 2002
| Party | Candidate | Votes | % | ±% |
|---|---|---|---|---|
| Liberal Democrats | Kevin Thompson | 528 | 51.7 | +21.4 |
| Labour | | 493 | 48.3 | −21.4 |
| Majority | | 35 | 3.4 | |
| Turnout | | 1,021 | | |
| Liberal Democrats gain from Labour | | Swing | | |
