= Middleton One Row =

Village in County Durham, England

Coordinates: 54.505°N 1.460°W

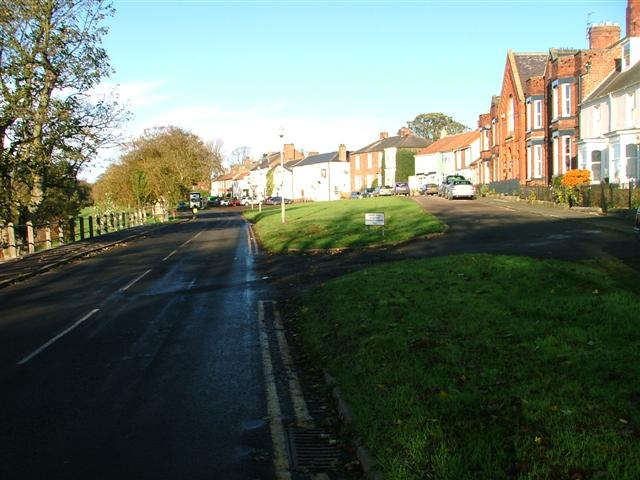
- Middleton One Row

- Location within County Durham
- Population: (2011)
- OS grid reference: NZ351123
- Unitary authority: Darlington
- Ceremonial county: County Durham
- Region: North East
- Country: England
- Sovereign state: United Kingdom
- Post town: Darlington
- Postcode district: DL2
- Police: Durham
- Fire: County Durham and Darlington
- Ambulance: North East
- UK Parliament: Sedgefield

Middleton One Row is a village in the borough of Darlington and the ceremonial county of County Durham, England. It is situated approximately 4 miles (6.4 km) south east of Darlington. The village was originally developed as a spa resort in the late 18th century with properties developed on one row, overlooking the banks of the River Tees.

== History ==
The village and neighbouring Middleton St George, unlike other places of the name, is not from Old English middel "middle" and tun "farm". Instead, the name is from Old English mycel "large (compare "much")" + tun "farm". The name was recorded as Micletone in 1148.

== Governance ==
Middleton One Row falls within the Sedgefield parliamentary constituency which is under the control of the Conservative Party. The current Member of Parliament, since the 2019 general election, is Paul Howell.

The village falls under the Sadberge and Middleton St. George ward of Darlington Borough Council, the parish council holds monthly meetings in the local community centre.

== Community and culture ==
The village contains a pub and restaurant called The Devonport and a former church, St Laurence's was owned by the Church of England and dated back to 1871, however it was officially closed in 2012 after structural difficulties and high repair costs, it has now been converted into a luxury home.
