= Brafferton, County Durham =

Village and civil parish in England

Coordinates: 54.583°N 1.548°W

Brafferton
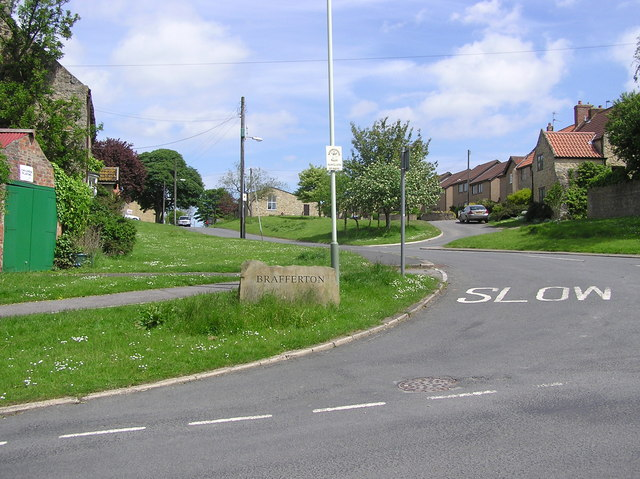
- Brafferton village from the west

- Location within County Durham
- Population: 154 (2011)
- OS grid reference: NZ293210
- Unitary authority: Darlington
- Ceremonial county: County Durham
- Region: North East
- Country: England
- Sovereign state: United Kingdom
- Post town: Darlington
- Postcode district: DL1
- Police: Durham
- Fire: County Durham and Darlington
- Ambulance: North East
- UK Parliament: Darlington

Brafferton is a village and civil parish in County Durham, England. It is administered as part of the borough of Darlington. The population of Brafferton Parish taken at the 2011 census was 154. It is situated between Darlington and Newton Aycliffe, a short distance from Coatham Mundeville.

Brafferton itself has few amenities, but nearby is the Darlington town centre, a local public house - The Foresters Arms - and the Hall Garth Hotel. Brafferton is near the A1 junction 59.

The Durham Ox was bred at Ketton Hall in Brafferton.
