= Wear Valley District Council elections =

English local elections

Wear Valley District Council elections were generally held every four years between the council's creation in 1974 and its abolition in 2009. Wear Valley was a non-metropolitan district in County Durham, England. On 1 April 2009 the council's functions passed to Durham County Council, which became a unitary authority.

== Political control ==
The first election to the council was held in 1973, initially operating as a shadow authority before coming into its powers on 1 April 1974. Political control of the council from 1974 until its abolition in 2009 was as follows:

| Party in control | Years |
|---|---|
| Labour | 1974–1976 |
| No overall control | 1976–1979 |
| Labour | 1979–1991 |
| Liberal Democrats | 1991–1995 |
| Labour | 1995–2007 |
| No overall control | 2007–2009 |

=== Leadership ===
The leaders of the council from 1995 until its abolition in 2009 were:

| Councillor | Party | From | To |
|---|---|---|---|
| Olive Brown | Labour | 1995 | 4 May 2005 |
| Neil Stonehouse | Labour | 4 May 2005 | 7 May 2008 |
| Tommy Taylor | Liberal Democrats | 7 May 2008 | 7 Jul 2008 |
| Neil Harrison | Liberal Democrats | 7 Jul 2008 | 31 Mar 2009 |

== Council elections ==
| Election | Labour | Liberal Democrat (Note: Liberal Party prior to 1983, SDP-Liberal Alliance in 1983 and 1987.) | Conservative | Independent | Total | Notes |
|---|---|---|---|---|---|---|
| 1973 | 21 | 9 | 0 | 11 (Note: Includes one People's Rep.) | 41 | |
| 1976 | 17 | 11 | 2 | 11 (Note: Includes five of other parties.) | 41 | |
| 1979 | 25 | 5 | 3 | 8 | 41 | |
| 1983 | 28 | 2 (Note: 2 Liberal, 0 SDP) | 3 | 7 (Note: Includes 1 People's Rep. and 1 People before pol.) | 40 | New ward boundaries |
| 1987 | 26 | 3 (Note: 3 Liberal, 0 SDP) | 3 | 8 | 40 | |
| 1991 | 8 | 28 | 0 | 4 | 40 | |
| 1995 | 35 | 2 | 0 | 3 | 40 | |
| 1999 | 30 | 5 | 0 | 5 | 40 | |
| 2003 | 25 | 9 | 0 | 6 | 40 | New ward boundaries |
| 2007 | 19 | 16 | 0 | 5 | 40 | |

== Results maps ==
2003 results map

2007 results map

== By-election results ==
The following is an incomplete list of by-elections to Wear Valley District Council.

=== 1999-2003 ===
Bishop Auckland Town By-Election 30 March 2000
| Party | Candidate | Votes | % | ±% |
|---|---|---|---|---|
| Labour | | 359 | 49.0 | +4.0 |
| Liberal Democrats | | 249 | 34.0 | −14.0 |
| Conservative | | 125 | 17.1 | +10.0 |
| Majority | | 110 | 15.0 | |
| Turnout | | 733 | 22.9 | |
| Labour hold | | Swing | | |

Howden Le Wear By-Election 30 March 2000
| Party | Candidate | Votes | % | ±% |
|---|---|---|---|---|
| Labour | | 208 | 52.1 | −1.8 |
| Liberal Democrats | | 191 | 47.9 | +1.8 |
| Majority | | 17 | 4.2 | |
| Turnout | | 399 | 23.1 | |
| Labour hold | | Swing | | |

=== 2003-2007 ===
Woodhouse Close By-Election 26 February 2004
| Party | Candidate | Votes | % | ±% |
|---|---|---|---|---|
| Labour | | 713 | 56.0 | −2.5 |
| Liberal Democrats | Kenneth Bowser | 287 | 22.5 | −11.7 |
| Independent | | 273 | 21.4 | +21.4 |
| Majority | | 426 | 33.5 | |
| Turnout | | 1,273 | 36.5 | |
| Labour hold | | Swing | | |

Wheatbottom & Helmington Row By-Election 20 January 2005
| Party | Candidate | Votes | % | ±% |
|---|---|---|---|---|
| Labour | Rose Seabury | 328 | 59.6 | −10.0 |
| Liberal Democrats | John Bailey | 180 | 32.7 | +2.3 |
| BNP | Stuart Neil | 42 | 0.7 | +0.7 |
| Majority | | 148 | 26.9 | |
| Turnout | | 550 | 21.8 | |
| Labour hold | | Swing | | |

Bishop Auckland Town By-Election 3 March 2005
| Party | Candidate | Votes | % | ±% |
|---|---|---|---|---|
| Liberal Democrats | Samuel Zair | 181 | 36.7 | +11.6 |
| Labour | Robert Yorke | 161 | 32.7 | −4.9 |
| Conservative | James Tague | 135 | 27.3 | +27.3 |
| UKIP | Margaret Hopson | 16 | 3.2 | +3.2 |
| Majority | | 20 | 4.0 | |
| Turnout | | 493 | 21.0 | |
| Liberal Democrats gain from Independent | | Swing | | |

Howden By-Election 27 October 2005
| Party | Candidate | Votes | % | ±% |
|---|---|---|---|---|
| Liberal Democrats | John Bailey | 157 | 50.5 | +6.0 |
| Labour | Jay Smith | 154 | 49.5 | −6.0 |
| Majority | | 3 | 1.0 | |
| Turnout | | 311 | 24.0 | |
| Liberal Democrats gain from Labour | | Swing | | |

Coundon By-Election 3 September 2006
| Party | Candidate | Votes | % | ±% |
|---|---|---|---|---|
| Labour | Norman Strongman | 360 | 52.1 | −2.1 |
| Liberal Democrats | Diane Hardaker | 331 | 47.9 | +2.1 |
| Majority | | 29 | 4.2 | |
| Turnout | | 691 | 21.6 | |
| Labour hold | | Swing | | |
