= Chester-le-Street District Council elections =

Local government elections in County Durham, England

Chestler-le-Street District Council elections were generally held every four years between the council's creation in 1974 and its abolition in 2009. Chester-le-Street was a non-metropolitan district in County Durham, England. On 1 April 2009 the council's functions passed to Durham County Council, which became a unitary authority.

== Political control ==
The first election to the council was held in 1973, initially operating as a shadow authority before coming into its powers on 1 April 1974. Throughout the council's existence from 1974 to 2009, Labour held a majority of the seats on the council.

Party in control	Years
Labour	1974–2009

=== Leadership ===
The leaders of the council from 1976 until its abolition in 2009 were:

Councillor	Party	From	To
George Staines	Labour	1976	10 May 1991
Malcolm Pratt	Labour	10 May 1991	May 2003
Linda Ebbatson	Labour	13 May 2003	31 Mar 2009

== Council elections ==
Election	Labour	Liberal Democrat (Note: Liberal Party prior to 1983, SDP-Liberal Alliance in 1983 and 1987.)	Conservative	Independent	Total	Notes
1973	23	6	0	4	33	
1976	22	6	0	5	33	
1979	21	7	0	5	33	New ward boundaries
1983	23	4 (Note: 4 Liberal, 0 SDP)	1	5	33	
1987	24	4 (Note: 4 Liberal, 0 SDP)	1	4	33	District boundary changes took place but the number of seats remained the same
1991	27	1	1	4	33	
1995	30	1	1	1	33	District boundary changes took place but the number of seats remained the same
1999	30	1	1	1	33	
2003	29	0	1	4	34	New ward boundaries
2007	26	1	2	5	34	

== Results maps ==
2003 results map

2007 results map

== By-election results ==
The following is an incomplete list of by-elections to Chester-le-Street District Council.

=== 1995-1999 ===
Chester Central By-Election 1 August 1996
Party	Candidate	Votes	%	±%
Labour		188	54.0	
Liberal Democrats		95	27.3	
Conservative		65	18.6	
Majority		93	26.7	
Turnout		348	27.3	
Labour hold		Swing		

Pelton By-Election 20 March 1997
Party	Candidate	Votes	%	±%
Labour		667	88.1	
Liberal Democrats		90	11.9	
Majority		577	76.2	
Turnout		757	19.0	
Labour hold		Swing		

=== 1999-2003 ===
Ouston By-Election 30 September 1999
Party	Candidate	Votes	%	±%
Labour		422	83.9	
Conservative		81	16.1	
Majority		341	67.8	
Turnout		503	20.5	
Labour hold		Swing		

Chester-le-Street West By-Election 5 April 2001
Party	Candidate	Votes	%	±%
Labour			60.3	−13.6
Conservative		454	33.9	+33.9
Independent		44	5.8	+5.8
Majority		199	26.4	
Turnout				
Labour hold		Swing		

=== 2003-2007 ===
Chester North By-Election 2 October 2003
Party	Candidate	Votes	%	±%
Labour		1,114	48.2	−10.0
Conservative		604	26.1	−15.7
Liberal Democrats		423	18.3	+18.3
BNP		170	7.4	+7.4
Majority		510	22.1	
Turnout		2,311	60.4	
Labour hold		Swing		

Edmondsley and Waldridge By-Election 16 September 2004
Party	Candidate	Votes	%	±%
Labour		628	42.2	
Liberal Democrats		537	36.1	
Conservative		324	21.8	
Majority		91	6.1	
Turnout		1,489	37.9	
Labour hold		Swing		

Pelton Fell By-Election 10 February 2005
Party	Candidate	Votes	%	±%
Labour		310	87.0	
Liberal Democrats		46	12.9	
Majority		264	74.1	
Turnout		356	33.6	
Labour hold		Swing		

Pelton By-Election 15 June 2006
Party	Candidate	Votes	%	±%
Labour	Dorothy Rand	530	64.0	+23.8
Conservative	Amanda Hall	139	16.8	−1.8
Liberal Democrats	Philip Nathan	113	13.6	+13.6
Independent	George Gardner	46	5.6	−35.6
Majority		391	47.2	
Turnout		828	19.8	
Labour hold		Swing		

=== 2007-2009 ===
Chester Central By-Election 27 September 2007
Party	Candidate	Votes	%	±%
Labour	Lawson Armstrong	324	59.4	−11.1
Conservative	Nick Varley	89	16.3	−13.2
Liberal Democrats	Sean Kilkenny	81	14.9	+14.9
BNP	Andrew Gowland	51	9.4	+9.4
Majority		235	43.1	
Turnout		545	25.7	
Labour hold		Swing		
