= Teesdale District Council elections =

Local government elections in County Durham, England

Teesdale District Council elections were generally held every four years between the council's creation in 1974 and its abolition in 2009. Teesdale was a non-metropolitan district in County Durham, England. On 1 April 2009 the council's functions passed to Durham County Council, which became a unitary authority.

== Political control ==
The first election to the council was held in 1973, initially operating as a shadow authority before coming into its powers on 1 April 1974. Throughout the council's existence from 1974 to 2009, a majority of the seats on the council were held by independent councillors.

Party in control	Years
Independent	1974–2009

=== Leadership ===
The council introduced the position of leader of the council in 2005. The leaders from 2005 until the council's abolition in 2009 were:

Councillor	Party	From	To
Ken Robinson	Labour	18 May 2005	2007
Richard Betton	Independent	2007	2009

== Council elections ==
Election	Labour	Liberal Democrat (Note: Liberal Party prior to 1983, SDP-Liberal Alliance in 1983 and 1987.)	Conservative	Independent	Teesdale Independents	Total	Notes
1973	0	0	0	29	0	29	
1976	4	0	0	25	0	29	
1979	3	0	0	26	0	29	
1983	3	0	0	28	0	31	New ward boundaries
1987	5	1 (Note: 1 Liberal, 0 SDP)	3	21 (Note: Including one Independent Labour)	0	31 (Note: Including one vacancy after election)	
1991	5	1	2	23	0	31	District boundary changes took place but the number of seats remained the same
1995	11	0	2	18	0	31	
1999	10	0	1	20	0	31	
2003	9	0	3	20	0	32	New ward boundaries
2007	6	0	4	6	16	32	

== Results maps ==
2003 results map

2007 results map

== By-election results ==
The following is an incomplete list of by-elections to Teesdale District Council.
