= Middleton St George =

Village in County Durham, England

Coordinates: 54.51243°N 1.46757°W

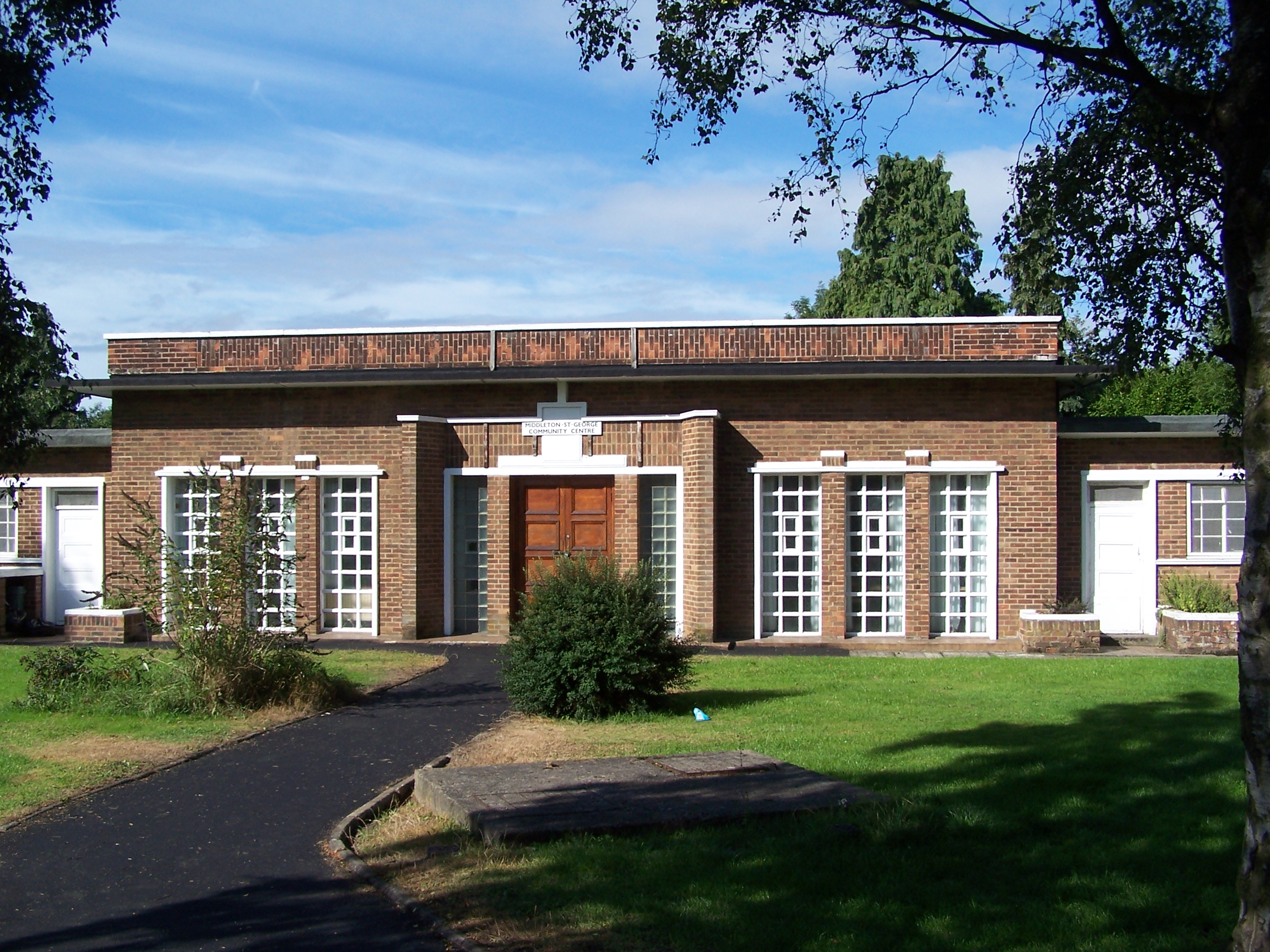
- Middleton St George Community Centre

- Location within County Durham
- Population: 3,779 (2011)
- OS grid reference: NZ345131
- Unitary authority: Darlington
- Ceremonial county: County Durham
- Region: North East
- Country: England
- Sovereign state: United Kingdom
- Post town: DARLINGTON
- Postcode district: DL2
- Dialling code: 01325
- Police: Durham
- Fire: County Durham and Darlington
- Ambulance: North East
- UK Parliament: Stockton West

Middleton St George is a large village and civil parish in the borough of Darlington and the ceremonial county of County Durham, in the north east of England. It is situated approximately 3.5 miles (5.6 km) east of Darlington.

== Demographics ==
According to the 2011 UK Census the population was 3,779, including Middleton One Row, Low Middleton and Oak Tree. It has grown rapidly since the mid-1990s, becoming a commuter area for Darlington. The population of the Darlington ward in question again taken at the 2011 Census was 4,650. The total population of Darlington was 112,489 in 2024.

== History ==
In 1870-72 John Marius Wilson's Imperial Gazetteer of England and Wales described Middleton St. George.

== Governance ==
Since the 2023 review of Westminster constituencies, Middleton St George has been within the Stockton West parliamentary constituency. The current Member of Parliament is Matt Vickers.

The village was previously within within the Sedgefield parliamentary constituency. One former member of parliament for the constituency was Prime Minister Tony Blair

The village falls under the Sadberge and Middleton St. George ward of Darlington Borough Council, the parish council holds monthly meetings in th Parish Council building in the Water Park.

== Transport ==
The original line of the Stockton and Darlington Railway passed through the village, which is now served by Dinsdale railway station, within a mile of the village is Teesside International Airport, formerly RAF Middleton St. George.

Middleton St George is also served by an hourly bus service provided by Arriva North East, which links the airport to Darlington and Hurworth Place.

== Education ==
The village primary school, St George's Church of England Academy has approximately 400 pupils aged 3 to 11, in 2019 it was among the top 3 percent of primary schools nationally for student progress.

In the neighbouring village of Hurworth is local secondary school Hurworth School where most of the village's 11-16 year olds attend.

== Religion ==
The nearest church to the village is the Church of England St. George's in Low Middleton, however due to a lack of facilities, the building does not hold regular Sunday services, those instead being held at the village school, the premises still functions for weddings, baptisms, funerals and Christmas & Easter services.

Another Church of England property, St Laurence's in adjoining Middleton One Row dated back to 1871, and was officially closed in 2012 after structural difficulties and high repair costs, it has now been converted into a luxury home.

== Community and culture ==
The local community centre was formerly a pumping station dating back to 1930, having been sold to the parish council in 1980.

The village amenities include convenience stores, independently owned takeaways, a pet supply shop, a veterinarian practice and a local public house. There is also a cricket club entitled Middleton St George Cricket and Social Club which is also a public house.

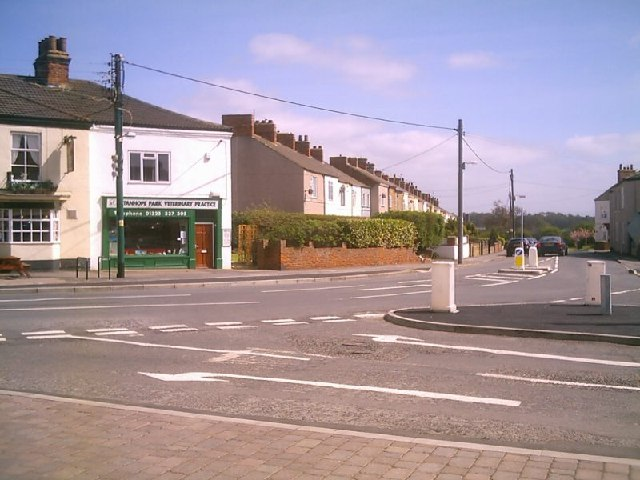
Middleton St George Village Centre in 2005

There are also healthcare services in the form of St. George's Medical Practice and a dental surgery.

=== Sport ===
The local football team, Middleton Rangers FC, play in the Stockton Sunday League Division 1, an affiliate league of the North Yorkshire County Football Association. The village cricket club, Middleton St George CC, play in the Darlington and District Cricket League Division A. The nearby Dinsdale Golf Club has a history dating back to 1910.
