= Killerby, County Durham =

Coordinates: 54.575°N 1.703°W

Killerby
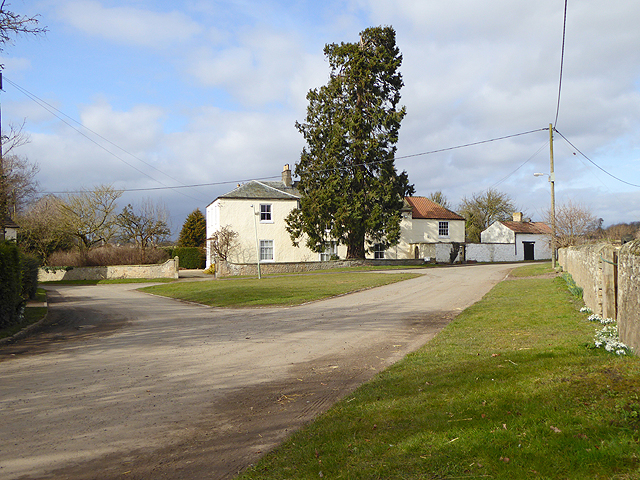
- Killerby Hall and green

- Location within County Durham
- Population: 62 (2021 census)
- Civil parish: Killerby
- Unitary authority: Darlington
- Ceremonial county: Durham
- Region: North East
- Country: England
- Sovereign state: United Kingdom
- Police: Durham
- Fire: County Durham and Darlington
- Ambulance: North East

Killerby is a hamlet in the borough of Darlington and the ceremonial county of County Durham, England. It is situated a few miles to the west of Darlington. In 2021 the parish had a population of 62.

In the Imperial Gazetteer of England and Wales (1870–72) John Marius Wilson described Killerby:

KILLERBY, a township in Heighington parish, Durham; 7 miles NW of Darlington. Acres, 605. Real property, £1, 063. Pop., 109. Houses, 20. This place is a meet for the Raby hounds.

== Etymology ==
The name Killerby is of Old Norse origin. The first element is the given-name Kilvert and the second is bȳ meaning "farm". Spellings of the place-name suggest the first element was mistaken for Old French culvert ("freeman").

== Demographics ==
At the 2011 Census the population was less than 100.
