= 2023 Darlington Borough Council election =

2023 English local election

- 4 May 2023

All 50 seats to Darlington Borough Council 26 seats needed for a majority

	First party	Second party	Third party
Leader	Stephen Harker	Jonathan Dulston	Matthew Snedker
Party	Labour	Conservative	Green
Last election	20 seats, 33.2%	22 seats, 41.5%	2 seats, 13.2%
Seats won	24	15	7
Seat change	▲4	▼7	▲5
Popular vote	24,798	26,324	13,271
Percentage	34.9%	37.1%	18.7%
Swing	▲1.7%	▼4.4%	▲5.5%
	Fourth party	Fifth party
Leader	Anne-Marie Curry
Party	Liberal Democrats	Independent
Last election	3 seats, 4.2%	3 seats, 6.6%
Seats won	3	1
Seat change	0	▼2
Popular vote	3,347	3,273
Percentage	4.7%	4.6%
Swing	▲0.5%	▼2.0%
- Winner of each seat at the 2023 Darlington Borough Council election
Leader before election
Jonathan Dulston
Conservative
No overall control
Leader after election
Stephen Harker
Labour
No overall control

The 2023 Darlington Borough Council election took place on 4 May 2023 to elect all 50 members of Darlington Borough Council in County Durham, England. This was at the same time as other local elections across England.

The council was under no overall control prior to the election, being led by a Conservative minority administration. The council remained under no overall control after the election, but Labour overtook the Conservatives to become the largest party. A Labour and Liberal Democrat coalition formed after the election, with Labour group leader Steven Harker being appointed leader of the council at the subsequent annual council meeting on 25 May 2023.

== Results ==
Following the results, the council remained with no overall control, but Labour became the largest party.

2023 Darlington Borough Council election
Party	Candidates	Seats	Gains	Losses	Net gain/loss	Seats %	Votes %	Votes	+/−
Labour	50	24	5	1	▲4	48.0	34.9	24,798	+1.7
Conservative	49	15	0	7	▼7	30.0	37.1	26,324	–4.4
Green	50	7	7	0	▲5	14.0	18.7	13,271	+5.5
Liberal Democrats	16	3	0	0	0	6.0	4.7	3,347	+0.5
Independent	11	1	0	2	▼2	2.0	4.6	3,273	–2.0

== Ward results ==
The candidates for each ward were named on 13 April 2023.

=== Bank Top and Lascelles ===
Bank Top and Lascelles (3 seats)
Party	Candidate	Votes	%	±%
Labour	Helen Crumbie*	593	52.9	+16.3
Labour	David Ray	579	51.6	+15.2
Labour	Andrew Anderson	577	51.4	+19.4
Conservative	Jo Barker	354	31.6	+8.4
Conservative	Emily Chamberlain	322	28.7	+5.8
Conservative	Pat Tobin	312	27.8	N/A
Independent	Darrien Wright*	157	14.0	–38.3
Green	Helen Whittington	95	8.5	–13.8
Green	Geoff Hill	84	7.5	N/A
Green	Ian MacMurray	74	6.6	N/A
Majority		223	19.9	
Registered electors		4,417		
Turnout		1,122	25.4	
Rejected ballots		2	0.18	
Labour hold				
Labour gain from Independent				
Labour hold				

=== Brinkburn and Faverdale ===
Brinkburn and Faverdale (3 seats)
Party	Candidate	Votes	%	±%
Labour	Rebecca Baker	987	47.0	+14.9
Labour	David Beckett	949	45.2	+14.8
Conservative	Scott Durham*	891	42.4	–4.0
Labour	Sarah Holt	880	41.9	+12.0
Conservative	Sally Clarke	877	41.7	–2.7
Conservative	Andrew Raw	843	40.1	+0.4
Green	Sarah Siddle	166	7.9	–14.4
Green	Ty Hankinson	139	6.6	N/A
Green	Nick Wilson	129	6.1	N/A
Liberal Democrats	Paul Bennett	86	4.1	N/A
Majority		11	0.5	
Registered electors		5,301		
Turnout		2,101	39.63	
Rejected ballots		6	0.29	
Labour gain from Conservative				
Labour gain from Conservative				
Conservative hold				

=== Cockerton ===
Cockerton (3 seats)
Party	Candidate	Votes	%	±%
Labour	Jan Cossins*	738	51.8	+7.2
Labour	Jim Garner	652	45.7	+2.9
Labour	Neil Johnson	634	44.5	+5.6
Conservative	Vicky Bartch	486	34.1	–2.6
Conservative	Sam Bell	485	34.0	+3.8
Conservative	Jonathan Hodgson	473	33.2	+3.0
Green	Vicky Atkinson	184	12.9	–8.2
Green	Susie Broughton	143	10.0	N/A
Green	Tamara Ullyart	128	9.0	N/A
Liberal Democrats	Malcolm Dunstone	71	5.0	–6.7
Majority		148	10.4	
Registered electors		4,587		
Turnout		1,426	31.09	
Rejected ballots		3	0.21	
Labour hold				
Labour hold				
Labour hold				

=== College ===
College (2 seats)
Party	Candidate	Votes	%	±%
Green	Matthew Snedker*	1,255	64.9	+10.9
Green	Bryony Holroyd*	1,245	64.3	+19.2
Conservative	Mark Hardy	479	24.8	–16.2
Conservative	Andy Maughan	442	22.8	–10.1
Labour	Elizabeth Watson	152	7.9	–2.9
Labour	Lian Hutchings	143	7.4	–2.2
Liberal Democrats	Charlie Curry	32	1.7	N/A
Majority		766	39.7	
Registered electors		3,347		
Turnout		1,935	57.81	
Rejected ballots		5	0.26	
Green hold				
Green hold				

=== Eastbourne ===
Eastbourne (3 seats)
Party	Candidate	Votes	%	±%
Independent	Kevin Nicholson*	629	42.4	–28.8
Conservative	Jonathan Dulston*	622	42.0	+5.2
Labour	Joe Dillon	529	35.7	+13.6
Labour	Chris Taylor	476	32.1	+11.3
Labour	Jan Taylor	466	31.4	+12.1
Independent	Maureen Martin	368	24.8	N/A
Conservative	Alison Reynolds	276	18.6	N/A
Independent	Steven Tait*	268	18.1	–44.3
Green	Sue Morley	100	6.7	–16.2
Green	Stuart Bramley	90	6.1	N/A
Green	Richard Wise	69	4.7	N/A
Majority		53	3.6	
Registered electors		4,712		
Turnout		1,482	31.45	
Rejected ballots		2	0.13	
Independent hold				
Conservative hold				
Labour gain from Independent				

=== Harrowgate Hill ===
Harrowgate Hill (3 seats)
Party	Candidate	Votes	%	±%
Green	Roz Henderson	846	44.4	+21.9
Green	Anna-Maria Toms	765	40.1	N/A
Green	Richard Lawley	720	37.8	N/A
Labour	Martin Landers	586	30.7	–6.9
Labour	Joe Passman	563	29.5	–7.2
Labour	Sophie Landers	561	29.4	–4.2
Conservative	Jon Clarke*	489	25.6	–14.8
Conservative	Samantha Bedingfield-Weller	475	24.9	–14.8
Conservative	Mikey Vasey	421	22.1	–14.6
Independent	Ian Ferguson	70	3.7	–16.8
Majority		134	7.0	
Registered electors		4,734		
Turnout		1,907	40.28	
Rejected ballots		2	0.1	
Green gain from Conservative				
Green gain from Conservative				
Green gain from Labour				

=== Haughton and Springfield ===
Haughton and Springfield (3 seats)
Party	Candidate	Votes	%	±%
Labour	Chris McEwan*	904	54.8	+8.7
Labour	Nick Wallis*	846	51.3	+10.7
Labour	Dawn Storr	811	49.2	+4.3
Conservative	Paul Culley	627	38.0	–1.0
Conservative	Robert Mills	587	35.6	+2.5
Conservative	Joe Dunn	548	33.2	+0.3
Green	Andrew Bramfitt	151	9.2	–13.2
Green	Bill Stuart	130	7.9	N/A
Green	Alex Swainston	124	7.5	N/A
Majority		184	11.2	
Registered electors		4,753		
Turnout		1,649	34.69	
Rejected ballots		4	0.24	
Labour hold				
Labour hold				
Labour hold				

=== Heighington and Coniscliffe ===
Heighington and Coniscliffe (2 seats)
Party	Candidate	Votes	%	±%
Conservative	Gerald Lee*	869	55.9	–14.2
Conservative	Paul Crudass*	665	42.8	–15.7
Independent	Holly White	425	27.3	N/A
Labour	Paul Harman	275	17.7	+4.0
Labour	Tony Roberts	273	17.6	+4.0
Green	Michael Cooke	178	11.4	–10.1
Green	Michael Fearneyhough	122	7.8	N/A
Liberal Democrats	Bill Oliver	67	4.3	N/A
Majority		240	15.5	
Registered electors		3,815		
Turnout		1,555	40.76	
Rejected ballots		6	0.39	
Conservative hold				
Conservative hold				

=== Hummersknott ===
Hummersknott (2 seats)
Party	Candidate	Votes	%	±%
Green	Thomas Robinson	1,009	53.2	+32.2
Green	Kate Mammolotti	985	51.9	N/A
Conservative	Bill Galbraith	798	42.1	–13.0
Conservative	Jack Sowerby*	732	38.6	–13.3
Labour	Clare McAdam	93	4.9	–9.6
Labour	Rebecca Taylor	85	4.5	–6.7
Majority		187	9.9	
Registered electors		3,097		
Turnout		1,897	61.25	
Rejected ballots		2	0.11	
Green gain from Conservative				
Green gain from Conservative				

=== Hurworth ===
Hurworth (2 seats)
Party	Candidate	Votes	%	±%
Conservative	Lorraine Tostevin*	716	54.4	+3.3
Conservative	Paul Walters	644	49.0	+4.1
Liberal Democrats	Joe Kelley	325	24.7	–9.6
Liberal Democrats	Nigel Boddy	278	21.1	N/A
Labour	Hannah Guy	190	14.4	+3.2
Green	Peter Commane	169	12.9	–18.1
Labour	Elizabeth Muggleton	157	11.9	+1.7
Green	Chris Fishwick	75	5.7	N/A
Majority		319	24.4	
Registered electors		3,207		
Turnout		1,315	41.0	
Rejected ballots		7	0.53	
Conservative hold				
Conservative hold				

=== Mowden ===
Mowden (2 seats)
Party	Candidate	Votes	%	±%
Conservative	Pauline Culley*	871	56.9	–5.8
Conservative	Alan Marshall*	842	55.0	–5.0
Labour	Bob Carson	441	28.8	+8.5
Labour	Tom Paver	426	27.8	+8.0
Green	Vanessa Hilton	187	12.2	–8.9
Green	Paul Hilton	159	10.4	N/A
Liberal Democrats	Laura Wilson	60	3.9	N/A
Majority		401	26.3	
Registered electors		3,069		
Turnout		1,532	49.92	
Rejected ballots		5	0.33	
Conservative hold				
Conservative hold				

=== North Road ===
North Road (3 seats)
Party	Candidate	Votes	%	±%
Liberal Democrats	Anne-Marie Curry*	465	41.1	–5.7
Liberal Democrats	Hilary Allen*	438	38.7	–3.0
Liberal Democrats	James Coe	394	34.8	+0.5
Labour	Jan Bowles	353	31.2	+1.9
Labour	Jonnie Vasey	323	28.5	+2.8
Labour	Syed Haque	293	25.9	+2.2
Conservative	Nigel Kendrew	226	20.0	+8.6
Conservative	Rachael Booth	197	17.4	+6.7
Conservative	Pratish Thakkar	179	15.8	+5.7
Green	Jon Barley	111	9.8	–4.3
Green	Kathy Barley	104	9.2	N/A
Green	Faith Lawley	100	8.8	N/A
Majority		41	3.6	
Registered electors		4,134		
Turnout		1,132	27.38	
Rejected ballots		5	0.44	
Liberal Democrats hold				
Liberal Democrats hold				
Liberal Democrats hold				

=== Northgate ===
Northgate (2 seats)
Party	Candidate	Votes	%	±%
Labour	Sonia Kane	380	50.6	–1.8
Labour	Syeda Ali	373	49.7	+0.4
Conservative	Yvonne Richardson	207	27.6	+5.4
Conservative	Eldhose Saju	188	25.0	+7.5
Liberal Democrats	David Collinge	80	10.7	N/A
Green	Louise Maddison	72	9.6	–8.4
Green	Neil Kang-Scarth	50	6.7	N/A
Majority		166	22.3	
Registered electors		2,574		
Turnout		751	29.18	
Rejected ballots		5	0.67	
Labour hold				
Labour hold				

=== Park East ===
Park East (3 seats)
Party	Candidate	Votes	%	±%
Labour	Libby McCollom*	704	52.7	+8.8
Labour	Michael Nicholson*	680	50.9	+13.3
Labour	Matthew Roche	663	49.6	+4.7
Conservative	Martin Bell	413	30.9	+10.7
Conservative	Chris Lowery	385	28.8	+9.0
Conservative	Sarah Rose	342	25.6	+7.6
Green	Ann Hunter	172	12.9	–9.0
Green	Jane Mitchell	137	10.2	N/A
Green	Kulvanth Kaur	133	9.9	N/A
Liberal Democrats	Scott Wood	92	6.9	–8.9
Independent	Janne Gandy	70	5.2	N/A
Majority		250	18.8	
Registered electors		4,608		
Turnout		1,337	29.01	
Rejected ballots		6	0.45	
Labour hold				
Labour hold				
Labour hold				

=== Park West ===
Park West (2 seats)
Party	Candidate	Votes	%	±%
Conservative	Heather Scott*	789	42.5	–4.2
Conservative	Bob Donoghue*	757	40.8	–2.9
Labour	Mel McEvoy	399	21.5	+2.9
Liberal Democrats	Sarah Sams	399	21.5	N/A
Liberal Democrats	Simon Thorley	364	19.6	N/A
Green	Martin Wood	324	17.5	–17.8
Labour	John Sloss	319	17.2	–1.3
Green	William Rowell	226	12.2	–18.8
Majority		358	19.4	
Registered electors		3,481		
Turnout		1,856	53.32	
Rejected ballots		6	0.32	
Conservative hold				
Conservative hold				

=== Pierremont ===
Pierremont (3 seats)
Party	Candidate	Votes	%	±%
Labour	Steve Harker*	872	56.4	+6.4
Labour	Mary Layton*	809	52.3	+7.7
Labour	James McGill	756	48.9	+2.1
Conservative	Roger Clark	488	31.5	–0.7
Conservative	Mags Donoghue	461	29.8	–1.5
Conservative	Catherine Hart	374	24.2	–2.4
Green	Cat McConnachie	194	12.5	–11.0
Green	Megan Hemsley	162	10.5	N/A
Green	Amy Mycock	150	9.7	N/A
Liberal Democrats	Gary Potter	97	6.3	N/A
Majority		268	17.4	
Registered electors		4,105		
Turnout		1,547	37.69	
Rejected ballots		6	0.39	
Labour hold				
Labour hold				
Labour hold				

=== Red Hall and Lingfield ===
Red Hall and Lingfield (2 seats)
Party	Candidate	Votes	%	±%
Labour	Mandy Porter	551	52.6	+4.3
Labour	Amanda Riley	534	51.0	+5.7
Conservative	KJ Hawkins	408	38.9	+5.6
Conservative	David Willis	400	38.2	+6.9
Green	Joanne Ashwood	64	6.1	–17.0
Green	Mary Gravenor	61	5.8	N/A
Majority		126	12.1	
Registered electors		3,241		
Turnout		1,048	32.34	
Rejected ballots		3	0.29	
Labour hold				
Labour hold				

One of the two Red Hall and Lingfield seats had been vacant prior to the election, following the death in March 2023 of Labour councillor Hilary Lucas.

=== Sadberge and Middleton St George ===
Sadberge and Middleton St George (3 seats)
Party	Candidate	Votes	%	±%
Conservative	Deborah Laing*	909	48.5	–13.3
Conservative	Yvonne Renton	750	40.0	–31.9
Conservative	Colin Pease	744	39.7	–31.7
Independent	Maria Darling	645	34.4	N/A
Independent	David Darling	596	31.8	N/A
Labour	Sandy Thorne-Wallis	363	19.4	–3.4
Labour	Lee Vasey	283	15.1	–0.6
Labour	Paul Webster	259	13.8	–1.2
Green	Suzy Lucas	227	12.1	–10.5
Green	Paul Foster	224	12.0	N/A
Green	Fred Greenhow	182	9.7	N/A
Liberal Democrats	Christopher Marlowe	99	5.3	N/A
Majority		99	5.3	
Registered electors		5,216		
Turnout		1,874	35.93	
Rejected ballots		2	0.11	
Conservative hold				
Conservative hold				
Conservative hold				

=== Stephenson ===
Stephenson (2 seats)
Party	Candidate	Votes	%	±%
Labour	Ian Haszeldine*	483	50.6	+14.6
Labour	Mohammad Mahmud	432	45.2	+10.0
Conservative	Mike Renton*	403	42.2	–11.1
Conservative	Michael Walker	331	34.7	N/A
Green	Lucy Chapman	79	8.3	–19.3
Green	Pete Greenwood	48	5.0	N/A
Independent	Monty Brack	23	2.4	N/A
Independent	Frazer Spence	22	2.3	N/A
Majority		29	3.0	
Registered electors		3,193		
Turnout		955	29.91	
Rejected ballots		2	0.21	
Labour hold				
Labour gain from Conservative				

=== Whinfield ===
Whinfield (2 seats)
Party	Candidate	Votes	%	±%
Conservative	Jamie Bartch*	615	44.6	–10.4
Conservative	Andy Keir*	612	44.4	–10.5
Green	Mike McTimoney	474	34.4	+19.5
Green	Terri Hankinson	456	33.1	N/A
Labour	Amanda McEwan	266	19.3	–11.6
Labour	Josh Spears	234	17.0	–11.4
Majority		138	10.0	
Registered electors		3,002		
Turnout		1,379	45.94	
Rejected ballots		4	0.29	
Conservative hold				
Conservative hold				

== Changes 2023–2027 ==
- Yvonne Renton (Conservative, Sadberge and Middleton St George) left the party in October 2023 to sit as an independent.
- Colin Pease (Conservative, Sadberge and Middleton St George) left the party in May 2024 to sit as an independent.
- James Coe (Liberal Democrats, North Road) left the party in September 2024 to sit as an independent, saying he had become an independent councillor "after challenges with the Liberal Democrat Party".
- Thomas Robinson (Green Party, Hummersknott) left the party in October 2024 to sit as an independent; the reason for his departure was not disclosed.
- Amanda Riley (Labour, Red Hall and Lingfield) resigned in October 2025 due to health concerns, triggering a by-election that will be held on 11 December 2025.

=== By-elections ===
==== Red Hall and Lingfield ====
Red Hall and Lingfield by-election: 11 December 2025
Party	Candidate	Votes	%	±%
Reform	Michael Walker	341	37.7	N/A
Conservative	Kyle Bartch	157	17.3	–22.6
Liberal Democrats	Simon Thorley	157	17.3	N/A
Labour	Jonnie Vasey	152	16.8	–37.1
Green	Louise Maddison	89	9.8	+3.5
Independent	Monty Brack	9	1.0	N/A
Majority		184	20.3	N/A
Registered electors		3,302		
Turnout		907	27.47	
Rejected ballots		2	0.22	
Reform gain from Labour				
