= Durham City Council elections =

Local government elections in County Durham, England

Durham City Council elections were generally held every four years between the reforms of 1974 and the council's abolition in 2009. Durham was a non-metropolitan district in County Durham, England. On 1 April 2009 the council's functions passed to Durham County Council, which became a unitary authority.

== Political control ==
From 1836 to 1974 the city of Durham was a municipal borough, sometimes called "Durham and Framwelgate". Under the Local Government Act 1972 it had its territory enlarged and became a non-metropolitan district.

The first election to the reconstituted city council was held in 1973, initially operating as a shadow authority before coming into its revised powers on 1 April 1974. Political control of the council from 1974 until its abolition in 2009 was as follows:

Party in control	Years
Labour	1974–1979
No overall control	1979–1983
Labour	1983–2003
Liberal Democrats	2003–2009

=== Leadership ===
The leaders of the council from 2003 until its abolition in 2009 were:

Councillor	Party	From	To
Maurice Crathorne	Labour		May 2003
Sue Pitts	Liberal Democrats	20 May 2003	2004
Fraser Reynolds	Liberal Democrats	2004	2009

== Council elections ==
Election	Labour	Liberal Democrat (Note: Liberal Party prior to 1983, SDP-Liberal Alliance in 1983 and 1987.)	Conservative	Independent	Total	Notes
1973	40	7	0	14	61	
1976	34	10	0	17 (Note: Including one Independent Labour)	61	
1979	24	7	4	14	49	New ward boundaries
1983	27	9 (Note: 5 Liberal, 4 SDP)	2	11 (Note: Including one Independent Labour)	49	
1987	26	14 (Note: 5 Liberal, 9 SDP)	0	9 (Note: Including three Independent Labour)	49	City boundary changes took place but the number of seats remained the same
1991	28	15	0	6	49	
1995	38	7	0	4	49	City boundary changes took place but the number of seats remained the same
1999	33	13	0	3	49	
2003	17	30	0	3	50	New ward boundaries
2007	17	30	0	3	50	

== Results maps ==
2003 results map

2007 results map

== By-election results ==
The following is an incomplete list of by-elections to Durham City Council.

=== 1995-1999 ===
Deerness By-Election 22 May 1997
Party	Candidate	Votes	%	±%
Labour		561	64.2	
Independent		259	29.6	
Liberal Democrats		54	6.2	
Majority		302	34.6	
Turnout		874	31.0	
Labour hold		Swing		

=== 1999-2003 ===
Pelaw By-Election 12 December 2002
Party	Candidate	Votes	%	±%
Labour		239	51.7	−20.9
Liberal Democrats		223	48.3	+20.9
Majority		16	3.4	
Turnout		462	29.0	
Labour hold		Swing		

=== 2003-2007 ===
Brandon By-Election 11 December 2003
Party	Candidate	Votes	%	±%
Labour		645	59.5	−8.6
Liberal Democrats		396	36.5	+4.6
Conservative		43	4.0	+4.0
Majority		249	23.0	
Turnout		1,084	23.4	
Labour hold		Swing		

Belmont By-Election 16 December 2004
Party	Candidate	Votes	%	±%
Liberal Democrats		364	46.1	−4.5
Independent		244	30.9	+1.6
Labour		119	15.1	+0.1
Conservative		63	8.0	+2.9
Majority		120	15.2	
Turnout		790	26.4	
Liberal Democrats hold		Swing		

Newton Hall North By-Election 3 February 2005
Party	Candidate	Votes	%	±%
Liberal Democrats	Amanda Hopgood	740	70.7	−9.4
Labour		180	17.2	−2.7
Conservative		65	6.2	+6.2
Independent		62	5.9	+5.9
Majority		560	53.5	
Turnout		1,047	39.0	
Liberal Democrats hold		Swing		

Carrville and Gilesgate Moor By-Election 5 May 2005
Party	Candidate	Votes	%	±%
Liberal Democrats	Les Thomson	1,618	54.1	
Labour		1,141	38.2	
Conservative		229	7.7	
Majority		477	53.5	
Turnout		2,988	69.5	
Liberal Democrats hold		Swing		

Coxhoe By-Election 5 May 2005
Party	Candidate	Votes	%	±%
Labour	John Hepplewhite	1,947	69.3	
Liberal Democrats		640	22.8	
Conservative		221	7.9	
Majority		1,307	46.5	
Turnout		2,808	64.6	
Labour hold		Swing		

Shadforth & Sherburn By-Election 6 April 2006
Party	Candidate	Votes	%	±%
Liberal Democrats	Brian Colledge	658	48.7	−5.1
Labour	Angela Leary	625	46.3	+15.2
Conservative	Carolyn Smith	67	5.0	+5.0
Majority		33	2.4	
Turnout		1,350	35.1	
Liberal Democrats hold		Swing		
