= Borough of Darlington =

Unitary authority area in County Durham, England

- Unitary authority area and borough
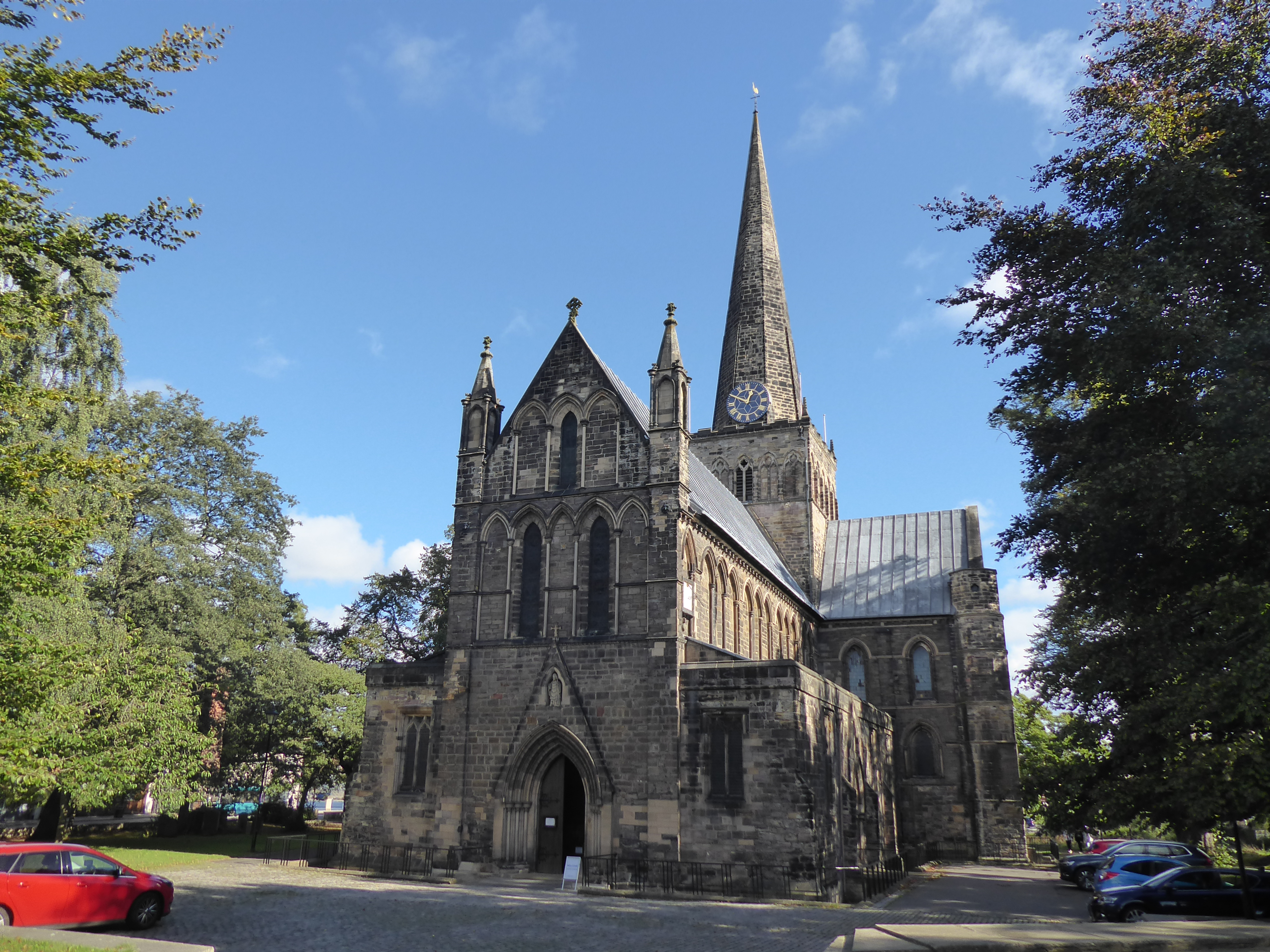
- Darlington parish church

- Coat of arms
- Motto: Latin: Optima Petamus, lit. 'let us seek the best'
- Darlington shown within County Durham
- Coordinates: 54.5167°N 1.5500°W
- Sovereign state: United Kingdom
- Country: England
- Region: North East
- Ceremonial county: County Durham
- City region: Tees Valley
- Incorporated: 1 April 1974
- Unitary authority: 1 April 1997
- Named for: Darlington
- Administrative HQ: Darlington Town Hall

Government
  - Type: Unitary authority
  - Body: Darlington Borough Council
  - Executive: Leader and cabinet
  - Control: No overall control
  - MPs: 2 MPs: Lola McEvoy (L); Matt Vickers (C)

Area
  - Total: 76 sq mi (197 km^{2})
  - Rank: 145th

Population (2025)
  - Total: 113,402
  - Rank: 220th
  - Density: 1,490/sq mi (574/km^{2})

Ethnicity (2021)
  - Ethnic groups: List: 94.4% White; 2.8% Asian; 1.4% Mixed; 0.9% other; 0.7% Black

Religion (2021)
  - Religion: List: 52.1% Christianity; 39.7% no religion; 1.7% Islam; 0.4% Hinduism; 0.4% Sikhism; 0.3% Buddhism; 0.0% Judaism; 0.4% other; 4.9% not stated
- Time zone: UTC+0 (GMT)
  - Summer (DST): UTC+1 (BST)
- Postcode areas: DL
- Dialling codes: 01325
- ISO 3166 code: GB-DAL
- GSS code: E06000005
- Website: www.darlington.gov.uk

The Borough of Darlington is a unitary authority area with borough status in County Durham, England. Since 1997 Darlington Borough Council has been a unitary authority; it is independent from Durham County Council. It is named after its largest settlement, the town of Darlington, where the council is based. The borough also includes a rural area surrounding the town which contains several villages. The population of the borough at the 2021 census was 107,800, of which over 86% (93,015) lived in the built-up area of Darlington itself.

Since 2016 the council has been a member of the Tees Valley Combined Authority, which has been led by the directly elected Tees Valley Mayor since 2017.

The neighbouring districts are the County Durham district to the north and west, Stockton-on-Tees to the east and North Yorkshire to the south, the River Tees forming the border for the latter.

== History ==
The town of Darlington was made a municipal borough in 1867. In 1915 it was elevated to become a county borough, taking over county-level functions from Durham County Council.

The borough was reformed and enlarged on 1 April 1974 under the Local Government Act 1972. It absorbed nearly all of the surrounding Darlington Rural District, with the exception of the parish of Great Aycliffe (which covers the town of Newton Aycliffe) which went to Sedgefield district. The enlarged borough was also reconstituted as a non-metropolitan district as part of the 1974 reforms, with Durham County Council once more providing county-level services to the town.

The council was made a unitary authority on 1 April 1997, regaining its independence from the county council. The way this change was implemented was to create a new non-metropolitan county of Darlington covering the same area as the existing borough, but with no separate county council; instead the existing borough council took on county functions, making it a unitary authority. The borough remains part of County Durham for ceremonial purposes, with whom it continues to share certain local services, such as the County Durham and Darlington Fire and Rescue Service and Durham Constabulary.

Since 2016 the council has been a member of the Tees Valley Combined Authority along with Hartlepool, Middlesbrough, Redcar and Cleveland and Stockton-on-Tees. Unlike Darlington, the other four districts in the combined authority had all been part of the county of Cleveland between 1974 and 1996.

== Governance ==
Darlington Borough Council

Type
- Type: Leader & Cabinet

Leadership
- Mayor: Helen Crumbie, Labour since 21 May 2026
- Leader: Steve Harker, Labour since 25 May 2023
- Chief executive: Rose Rouse since March 2025

Structure
- Seats: 50 councillors
- Graph of the party split among 50 seats.
- Political groups: Administration (25) Labour (23) Liberal Democrats (2) Other parties (25) Conservative (13) Green (6) Reform (1) Independent (5)
- Joint committees: Tees Valley Combined Authority

Elections
- Voting system: First-past-the-post
- Last election: 4 May 2023
- Next election: 6 May 2027

Meeting place
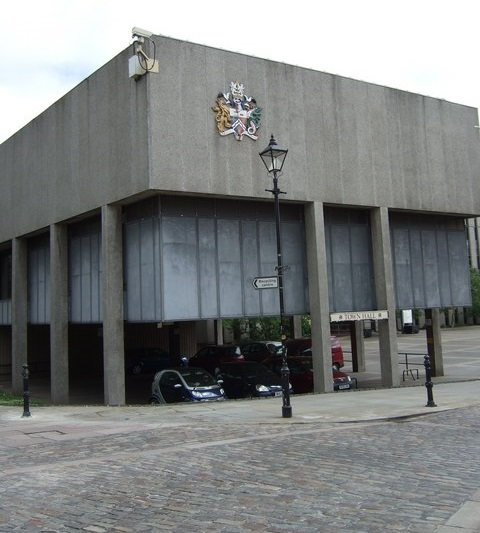
- Town Hall, Feethams, Darlington, DL1 5QT

Website
- www.darlington.gov.uk

Darlington Borough Council provides both county-level and district-level services. Parts of the borough are covered by civil parishes, which form a second tier of local government for their areas.

Since 2016 the council has been a member of the Tees Valley Combined Authority.

=== Political control ===
The council has been under no overall control since 2019. Following the 2023 election a coalition of Labour and the Liberal Democrats formed to run the council, led by Labour councillor Steve Harker.

Political control of the council since the 1974 reforms has been as follows:

Lower-tier non-metropolitan district

Party in control	Years
Labour	1974–1976
Conservative	1976–1979
Labour	1979–1987
No overall control	1987–1991
Labour	1991–1997

Unitary authority

Party in control	Years
Labour	1997–2019
No overall control	2019–present

=== Leadership ===
The role of mayor is largely ceremonial. Political leadership is instead provided by the leader of the council. An attempt to secure a referendum on having a directly elected mayor in 2006 was unsuccessful.

The leaders since 1991 have been:

Councillor	Party	From	To
John Williams	Labour	1991	8 May 2011
Bill Dixon	Labour	19 May 2011	19 Jul 2018
Steve Harker	Labour	19 Jul 2018	23 May 2019
Heather Scott	Conservative	23 May 2019	19 May 2022
Jonathan Dulston	Conservative	19 May 2022	25 May 2023
Steve Harker	Labour	25 May 2023	

=== Composition ===
Following the 2023 election, and subsequent changes of allegiance up to October 2026, the composition of the council was:

Party	Seats
Labour	23
Conservative	13
Green	6
Liberal Democrats	2
Reform	1
Independent	5
Total	50

The next election is due in 2027.

=== Elections ===
Since the last boundary changes in 2015 the council has comprised 50 councillors, representing 20 wards, each of which elects two or three councillors. Elections are held every four years.

=== Premises ===
The council is based at Darlington Town Hall on Feethams in the centre of Darlington. The building was purpose-built for the old county borough council and was completed in 1970.

== Settlements ==
As well as Darlington itself the borough includes the surrounding villages of:

- Archdeacon Newton
- Barmpton
- Beaumont Hill
- Bishopton
- Blackwell
- Brafferton
- Coatham Mundeville
- Denton
- Great Burdon
- Great Stainton
- Heighington
- High Coniscliffe
- Houghton
  - Houghton Bank
  - Houghton-le-Side
- Hurworth
  - Hurworth-on-Tees
  - Hurworth Place
  - Neasham
- Killerby
- Little Stainton
- Low Dinsdale
- Near airport
  - Middleton One Row
  - Middleton St George
  - Oak Tree
- Piercebridge
- Redworth
- Sadberge
- Summerhouse
- Walworth
  - Walworth
  - Walworth Gate

It is home to Teesside International Airport (previously known as Durham Tees Valley Airport).

== Freedom of the Borough ==
The following people and military units have received the Freedom of the Borough of Darlington.

=== Individuals ===
- John Williams: 24 November 2011.
- Alasdair MacConachie: 24 November 2011.

=== Military Units ===
- The Light Infantry: 1996.
- The Rifles: 17 September 2010.
