= 2013 Surrey County Council election =

2013 UK local government election

- 2 May 2013

All 81 seats to Surrey County Council 41 seats needed for a majority
	First party	Second party
Party	Conservative	Liberal Democrats
Seats won	58	9
Seat change	▲2	▼4
	Third party	Fourth party
Party	RA	UKIP
Seats won	8	3
Seat change	▼1	▲3
- Map showing the results of the 2013 Surrey County Council elections.
Council control before election
Conservative
Council control after election
Conservative

The Surrey County Council election, 2013 took place on 2 May 2013 as part of the 2013 United Kingdom local elections. 81 electoral divisions returned one county councillor each by first-past-the-post voting for a four-year term of office. Following a review, new electoral division boundaries were introduced for this election, increasing the number of councillors from 80 to 81.

All locally registered electors (British, Irish, Commonwealth and European Union citizens) who were aged 18 or over on Thursday 2 May 2013 were entitled to vote in the local elections. Those who were temporarily away from their ordinary address (for example, away working, on holiday, in student accommodation or in hospital) were also entitled to vote in the local elections, although those who had moved abroad and registered as overseas electors cannot vote in the local elections. It is possible to register to vote at more than one address (such as a university student who had a term-time address and lives at home during holidays) at the discretion of the local Electoral Register Office, but it remains an offence to vote more than once in the same local government election. The next election is scheduled for 4 May 2017.

== Summary ==
Despite suffering the loss of 335 of 1451 councillors in simultaneous elections across England, the Conservative Party increased their majority on the council by securing a net gain of two seats. Independent candidates and local residents' association groups won nine seats between them. The Liberal Democrats also secured nine seats, whilst losing four seats to the Conservatives. UKIP and the Green Party gained three seats and one seat respectively from the Conservatives to win their first representation on the council at this election. The Labour Party retained their only seat on the council.

== Electoral Review ==
For these elections the number of seats on the Council increased from 80 to 81 implementing, with a minor change, recommendations of the 2010 review by the Local Government Boundary Commission for England. During the consultation the Council in November 2010 recommended no change to the number of councillors (I.e. 80). Other submissions recommended a reduction in the number of councillors, including a representation from Surrey Heath District Council to reduce the number of councillors to 60. However, when the Council drafted its boundary proposals it realised that the allocation of 8 members to Waverley District would mean:

Waverley’s average division size would become 12,015 [electors], over 8% larger than the target size for the County. Given this and Waverley’s geographical nature, it would be extremely difficult to meet the Commission’s criteria regarding electoral equality whilst also meeting the other two criteria of community identity and convenient and effective local government.

Surrey County Council concluded that Waverley would, in its view, be unacceptably under-represented in a Council of 80 and so advocated a total of 81 seats in its final, modified size submission of March 2011. The LGBCE accepted this argument.

The boundary review resulted generally in minor revisions to a minority of divisions, with consequential name changes in a few instances.

== Candidates ==
The only party which nominated candidates in all 81 divisions was UKIP, followed by the Conservative Party, which contested 80 divisions (having failed, by mistake, to nominate a candidate for the Shalford division in the Guildford area). The Labour Party stood in 78 divisions and the Liberal Democrats contested 76 divisions. None of the other parties fielded candidates in a majority of divisions, with the Green Party and Residents Associations both standing in 12 divisions. Eleven candidates stood as independents.

== Results ==
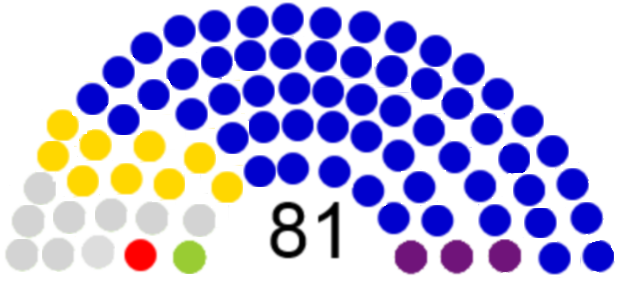
The distribution of seats after the 2013 Surrey County Council Election

Surrey County Council election, 2013
Party	Seats	Gains	Losses	Net gain/loss	Seats %	Votes %	Votes	+/−
Conservative	58	6	4	+2	72.0	39.6	102,121	-54,107
Liberal Democrats	9	0	4	-4	11.0	15.7	40,609	-51,059
Residents	8	0	1	-1	10.0	6.4	18,660	-1,390
UKIP	3	3	0	+3	4.0	22.3	57,598	+23,671
Labour	1	0	0	±0	1.0	10.8	27,782	+8,389
Independent	1	0	0	±0	1.0	3.35	6,051	-2,454
Green	1	1	0	+1	1.0	1.6	4,090	-2,321
Peace	0	0	0	±0	0.0	0.1	297	150
Monster Raving Loony	0	0	0	±0	0.0	0.05	127	
BNP	0	0	0	±0	0.0	0.04	98	-1,520
UK Community Issues Party	0	0	0	±0	0.0	0.02	43	
English Democrat	0	0	0	±0	0.0	0.02	39	

== Results by district ==
Surrey County Council is split into 81 single-member electoral divisions. These are grouped into 11 districts, each of which has between 6 and 10 divisions.

=== Elmbridge ===
Cobham
Party	Candidate	Votes	%	±%
Conservative	Mary Lewis	1,524	57	−12.8
UKIP	Richard Atkins	651	24	
Liberal Democrats	David Bellchamber	295	11	−12.7
Labour	Carolyn Gray	197	7	1.6
Majority				
Turnout		2,667	25.85	−10.65
Conservative hold		Swing		

East Molesey & Esher
Party	Candidate	Votes	%	±%
Residents	Stuart Selleck	1,134	41	−4
Conservative	Steve Bax	1,110	41	−2.1
UKIP	Trevor Marshall	291	11	
Labour	Irene Threlkeld	107	4	1.1
Liberal Democrats	Paul Nagle	63	2	−6.7
Monster Raving Loony	Chinners	34	1	
Majority				
Turnout		2,739	28.61	−14.29
Residents hold		Swing		

Hersham
Party	Candidate	Votes	%	±%
Conservative	Margaret Hicks	1,323	40	−1.7
Hersham Village Society	Roy Green	1,153	35	
UKIP	Richard Newbold	459	14	
Labour	Irene Hamilton	245	7	0.1
Liberal Democrats	Simon Lumb	120	4	−7.1
Majority		170		
Turnout		3,300	32.80	−8.8
Conservative hold		Swing		

Hinchley Wood, Claygate & Oxshott
Party	Candidate	Votes	%	±%
Conservative	Mike Bennison	1,943	50	
Liberal Democrats	Keya Ashraf	1,153	30	
UKIP	Bernard Collignon	569	15	
Labour	Sheila Francis	220	6	
Majority				
Turnout		3,885	32.48	−13.12
Conservative hold		Swing		

The Dittons
Party	Candidate	Votes	%	±%
Residents	Peter Hickman	1,861	55	
Conservative	Robert Stead	624	18	
UKIP	Susannah Cunningham	483	14	
Labour	Francis Eldergill	219	6	
Liberal Democrats	Mike Smith	203	6	
Majority				
Turnout		3,390	29.01	
Residents hold		Swing		

Walton
Party	Candidate	Votes	%	±%
Conservative	Rachael Lake	1,045	37	
The Walton Society	Mike Collins	904	32	
UKIP	Anita Wooldridge	445	16	
Labour	Peter Hawkes	316	11	
Liberal Democrats	Sereena Davey	97	3	
Majority				
Turnout		2,807	25.25	
Conservative gain from Residents		Swing	3.4	

Walton South & Oatlands
Party	Candidate	Votes	%	±%
Conservative	Tony Samuels	1,682	57	
UKIP	Gillian Grant	584	20	
Labour	Margaret Hawkes	350	12	
Liberal Democrats	John Smith	322	11	
Majority				
Turnout		2,938	26.99	
Conservative hold		Swing		

West Molesey
Party	Candidate	Votes	%	±%
Residents	Ernest Mallett	1,947	71	
UKIP	Steve Clements	353<	13	
Conservative	Christine Elmer	265	10	
Liberal Democrats	Alastair Sturgis	73	3	
Labour	Matt Willey	57	2	
Monster Raving Loony	Crazy Dave	41	1	
Majority				
Turnout		2,736	27.16	
Residents hold		Swing		

Weybridge
Party	Candidate	Votes	%	±%
Conservative	Christian Mahne	991	32	
Independent	Peter Harman	792	25	
Liberal Democrats	Andrew Davis	650	21	
UKIP	Ian Lake	524	17	
Labour	Martin Lister	158	5	
Majority				
Turnout		3,115	27.95	
Conservative hold		Swing		

=== Epsom and Ewell ===
Epsom Town & Downs
Party	Candidate	Votes	%	±%
Conservative	Tina Mountain	1,448	39	
Residents	Neil Dallen	1,060	28	
UKIP	Iain Bonner-Fomes	502	13	
Liberal Democrats	Alison Kelly	423	11	
Labour	Kate Chinn	289	8	
Majority				
Turnout			33	
Conservative gain from Residents		Swing		

Epsom West
Party	Candidate	Votes	%	±%
Liberal Democrats	Stella Lallement	854	28	
Residents	Paul Ardern-Jones	693	23	
Labour	Steve Dyke	616	20	
UKIP	Davi Crawford	494	16	
Conservative	Mhairi Fraser	389	13	
Majority				
Turnout			29	
Liberal Democrats hold		Swing		

Ewell
Party	Candidate	Votes	%	±%
Residents	John Beckett	2,065	63	
UKIP	David Hunt	539	16	
Conservative	Alison Chatterton	359	11	
Labour	Rosemary Taylor	148	5	
Liberal Democrats	Jim Dapre	84	3	
Green	Donna O'Brien	76	2	
Majority				
Turnout			27	
Residents hold		Swing		

Ewell Court, Auriol & Cuddington
Party	Candidate	Votes	%	±%
Residents	Eber Kington	2,233	64	
UKIP	Roger Kemp	624	18	
Conservative	Carole Edwards	310	9	
Labour	Colin Luxton	206	6	
Liberal Democrats	Rusmat Ahmed	90	3	
Majority				
Turnout			28	
Residents hold		Swing		

West Ewell
Party	Candidate	Votes	%	±%
Residents	Jan Mason	1,373	49	
UKIP	Bob Cane	495	18	
Conservative	Stephen Pontin	419	15	
Labour	Rob Geleit	370	13	
Liberal Democrats	Julia Kirkland	145	5	
Majority				
Turnout			24	
Residents hold		Swing		

=== Guildford ===
Ash
Party	Candidate	Votes	%	±%
Conservative	Marsha Molesey	1,312	47	
UKIP	Mazhar Manzoor	573	21	
Liberal Democrats	Alan Hilliar	568	20	
Labour	Joan O'Bryne	329	12	
Majority				
Turnout			28	
Conservative hold		Swing		

Guildford East
Party	Candidate	Votes	%	±%
Conservative	Graham Ellwood	1,874	50	
Liberal Democrats	Ted Mayne	931	25	
UKIP	Colin Reardon	568	15	
Labour	Malcolm Hill	384	10	
Majority				
Turnout			36	
Conservative hold		Swing		

Guildford North
Party	Candidate	Votes	%	±%
Liberal Democrats	Pauline Searle	1,115	35	
Conservative	Sharon Stokes	775	24	
UKIP	David Sheppard	659	21	
Labour	Michael Hassell	648	20	
Majority				
Turnout			27	
Liberal Democrats hold		Swing		

Guildford South-East
Party	Candidate	Votes	%	±%
Conservative	Mark Brett-Warburton	1,865	53	
Liberal Democrats	Kelly-Maire Blundell	905	26	
UKIP	Nyree Wadman	426	12	
Labour	Rajanathan Rajasingham	307	9	
Majority				
Turnout			33	
Conservative hold		Swing		

Guildford South-West
Party	Candidate	Votes	%	±%
Liberal Democrats	David Goodwin	1,189	38	
Conservative	Nils Christiansen	1,039	33	
Labour	Mary Davies	411	13	
UKIP	Laura McEvoy	409	13	
Peace	Tom May	117	4	
Majority				
Turnout			29	
Liberal Democrats hold		Swing		

Guildford West
Party	Candidate	Votes	%	±%
Liberal Democrats	Fiona White	732	35	
Labour	Brian Walter	494	24	
UKIP	Laurence Hodge	435	21	
Conservative	Chris Varveris	325	16	
Peace	John Morris	105	5	
Majority				
Turnout			20	
Liberal Democrats hold		Swing		

Horsleys
Party	Candidate	Votes	%	±%
Conservative	Bill Barker	2,177	60	
UKIP	Garreth Evans	750	21	
Liberal Democrats	Arnold Pindar	429	12	
Labour	Carolyn Fiddes	258	7	
Majority				
Turnout			36	
Conservative hold		Swing		

Shalford
Party	Candidate	Votes	%	±%
UKIP	George Johnson	1,411	51	
Liberal Democrats	George Potter	1,023	37	
Labour	Rose Seber	347	12	
Majority				
Turnout			27	
UKIP gain from Conservative		Swing		

Shere
Party	Candidate	Votes	%	±%
Conservative	Keith Taylor	1,907	57	
UKIP	Donna Walker	778	23	
Liberal Democrats	Marilyn Merryweather	361	11	
Labour	Robin Woof	309	9	
Majority				
Turnout			34	
Conservative hold		Swing		

Worplesdon
Party	Candidate	Votes	%	±%
Conservative	Keith Witham	1,816	51	
UKIP	Terry Wadman	777	22	
Liberal Democrats	Paul Cragg	609	17	
Labour	Michael Jeram	332	9	
Majority				
Turnout			32	
Conservative hold		Swing		

=== Mole Valley ===
Ashtead
Party	Candidate	Votes	%	±%
Independent	Christopher Townsend	2,283	53	
Conservative	Tim Ashton	1,332	31	
UKIP	Adrian Daniels	465	11	
Labour	Susan Gilchrist	166	4	
Liberal Democrats	Penelope Becker	95	2	
Majority				
Turnout		4,341	38.51	
Independent hold		Swing		

Bookham and Fetcham West
Party	Candidate	Votes	%	±%
Conservative	Clare Curran	2,115	46	
Liberal Democrats	Andrew Freeman	1,218	26	
UKIP	Mike Heelas	1,104	23	
Labour	Keith Davis	259	5	
Majority				
Turnout			39	
Conservative hold		Swing		

Dorking Hills
Party	Candidate	Votes	%	±%
Liberal Democrats	Hazel Watson	2,043	46	
Conservative	Lynne Hack	1,189	27	
UKIP	Apolinario Afonso	847	19	
Green	Jacquetta Fewster	200	5	
Labour	Jonathan Orde	151	3	
Majority				
Turnout			41	
Liberal Democrats hold		Swing		

Dorking Rural
Party	Candidate	Votes	%	±%
Conservative	Helyn Clack	1,810	40	
Liberal Democrats	Michael Ward	1,527	34	
UKIP	Leigh Jones	935	21	
Labour	Malcolm Ward	261	6	
Majority				
Turnout			41	
Conservative hold		Swing		

Dorking South and the Holmwoods
Party	Candidate	Votes	%	±%
Liberal Democrats	Stephen Cooksey	1,532	42	
Conservative	James Morton	974	27	
UKIP	Michael Foulston	774	21	
Labour	Frank Pemberton	328	9	
Turnout			38	
Liberal Democrats hold		Swing		

Leatherhead and Fetcham East
Party	Candidate	Votes	%	±%
Conservative	Tim Hall	1,564	42	
UKIP	Roger Bird	1,048	28	
Liberal Democrats	Bridget Lewis-Carr	782	21	
Labour	Robert Mallon	297	8	
Majority				
Turnout			31.5	
Conservative hold		Swing		

=== Reigate and Banstead ===
Banstead, Woodmansterne & Chipstead
Party	Candidate	Votes	%	±%
Conservative	Ken Gulati	1497	50.0	
UKIP	Chris Byrne	994	33.2	
Green	Phil Wilson	272	9.1	
Liberal Democrats	Helen Kulka	233	7.8	
Majority		503	16.8	
Turnout		2,996	26	
Conservative hold		Swing		

Earlswood and Reigate South
Party	Candidate	Votes	%	±%
Conservative	Barbara Thomas	955	33	
UKIP	Joseph Fox	899	31	
Labour	Graham Wildridge	615	21	
Green	Katie Smith	235	8	
Liberal Democrats	Anthony Lambell	219	7	
Majority				
Turnout		2,923	28.41	
Conservative hold		Swing		

Horley East
Party	Candidate	Votes	%	±%
Conservative	Dorothy Ross-Tomlin	1,069	47	
UKIP	Christian Stevens	716	31	
Labour	Linda Mabbett	253	11	
Liberal Democrats	Tim Deevoy	215	9	
Majority				
Turnout		2,281	24.72	
Conservative hold		Swing		

Horley West, Salfords and Sidlow
Party	Candidate	Votes	%	±%
Conservative	Kay Hammond	1,038	42	
UKIP	Timothy Brooke-Harte	889	36	
Labour	Rosie Norgrove	335	14	
Liberal Democrats	Barry Hamilton	215	9	
Majority				
Turnout		2,477	25.72	
Conservative hold		Swing		

Merstham and Banstead South
Party	Candidate	Votes	%	±%
Conservative	Bob Gardner	1,095	44	
UKIP	Bob Cambridge	698	28	
Labour	Julie Halford	450	18	
Liberal Democrats	Christopher Howell	271	11	
Turnout		2,514	25.33	
Conservative hold		Swing		

Nork and Tattenhams
Party	Candidate	Votes	%	±%
Residents Association	Nick Harrison	1,954	54	
UKIP	Andre Grant	583	18	
Conservative	Patsy Shillinglaw	517	16	
Labour	Clive Scott	111	3	
Liberal Democrats	Stephen Gee	91	3	
Green	Derek Smith	53	2	
Turnout		3,309	28.08	
Residents' Association hold		Swing		

Redhill East
Party	Candidate	Votes	%	±%
Green	Jonathan Essex	1,457	50	
Conservative	Richard Coad	645	22	
UKIP	Colin Stiff	379	13	
Labour	Stewart Dack	345	12	
Liberal Democrats	Andrew Cressy	103	4	
Turnout		2,929	28.91	
Green gain from Conservative		Swing		

Redhill West and Meadvale
Party	Candidate	Votes	%	±%
Conservative	Natalie Bramhall	995	30	
Green	Sarah Finch	700	21	
UKIP	Tim Pearson	633	19	
Liberal Democrats	Peter Lambell	587	18	
Labour	John Berge	364	11	
Turnout		3,279	32.23	
Conservative hold		Swing		

Reigate
Party	Candidate	Votes	%	±%
Conservative	Zully Grant-Duff	1,588	49	
Liberal Democrats	William Dyer	579	18	
UKIP	Stephen Russell	515	16	
Labour	Andrew Saunders	281	9	
Green	Bryn Truscott	268	8	
Turnout		3,231	31.01	
Conservative hold		Swing		

Tadworth, Walton and Kingswood
Party	Candidate	Votes	%	±%
Conservative	Michael Gosling	1,500	53	
UKIP	Robert Leach	901	32	
Green	Alistair Morten	230	8	
Liberal Democrats	Judith Briony	201	7	
Turnout		2,832	26.73	
Conservative hold		Swing		

=== Runnymede ===
Addlestone
Party	Candidate	Votes	%	±%
Conservative	John Furey	1,146	39.6	
UKIP	Toby Micklethwait	922	31.9	
Labour	Arran Neathey	589	20.4	
Liberal Democrats	Andrew Falconer	182	6	
Monster Raving Loony	Crazy Crab	52	2	
Majority				
Turnout			26	
Conservative hold		Swing		

Chertsey
Party	Candidate	Votes	%	±%
Conservative	Chris Norman	1284	41.9	
UKIP	Adam Shire	962	31.4	
Labour	Lee Godfrey	819	26.7	
Majority				
Turnout			28	
Conservative hold		Swing		

Egham
Party	Candidate	Votes	%	±%
Conservative	Yvonna Lay	730	42.4	
UKIP	Gwendoline Cornell	481	27.9	
Labour	David Bell	341	19.8	
Liberal Democrats	Dorian Mead	169	10	
Majority				
Turnout			21	
Conservative hold		Swing		

Englefield Green
Party	Candidate	Votes	%	±%
Conservative	Marisa Heath	950	42.7	
UKIP	John Gynn	541	24.3	
Labour	Jack Killian	349	15.7	
Green	Rustam Majainah	224	10	
Liberal Democrats	Andy Watson	159	7	
Majority				
Turnout			19.5	
Conservative hold		Swing		

Foxhills, Thorpe and Virginia Water
Party	Candidate	Votes	%	±%
Conservative	Mel Few	1,540	53.0	
UKIP	Graham Wood	832	28.6	
Labour	John Gurney	362	12.4	
Liberal Democrats	Ian Heath	174	6	
Majority				
Turnout			27	
Conservative hold		Swing		

Woodham and New Haw
Party	Candidate	Votes	%	±%
Conservative	Mary Angell	1,301	47.3	
UKIP	David Roe	850	30.9	
Labour	Anne Emerson	357	13.0	
Liberal Democrats	Jennifer Coulon	242	9	
Majority				
Turnout			28	
Conservative hold		Swing		

=== Spelthorne ===
Ashford
Party	Candidate	Votes	%	±%
Conservative	Carol Ann Coleman	1,299	44	
UKIP	Robert Bromley	964	33	
Labour	Joe Miller	511	17	
Liberal Democrats	Kelvin Gardiner	155	5	
Turnout		2,929	27.43	
Conservative hold		Swing		

Laleham and Shepperton
Party	Candidate	Votes	%	±%
Conservative	Richard Walsh	1,701	53	
UKIP	Linda Thatcher	902	28	
Labour	John Went	374	12	
Liberal Democrats	Richard Dunn	246	8	
Majority				
Turnout			31	
Conservative hold		Swing		

Lower Sunbury & Halliford
Party	Candidate	Votes	%	±%
Conservative	Tim Evans	1,117	37	
Liberal Democrats	Sandra Dunn	1,023	34	
UKIP	Nick Wood	877	29	
Majority				
Turnout			29	
Conservative gain from Liberal Democrats		Swing		

Staines
Party	Candidate	Votes	%	±%
Conservative	Denise Saliagopoulos	1,307	47	
UKIP	Marlon Kincses	622	22	
Labour	Imtiaz Khan	371	13	
Liberal Democrats	Susan Vincent	239	9	
Independent	Jacqueline Stanton	231	8	
Majority				
Turnout			26	
Conservative hold		Swing		

Staines South & Ashford West
Party	Candidate	Votes	%	±%
UKIP	Daniel Jenkins	1,175	38	
Conservative	Denise Turner-Stewart	1,171	38	
Labour	John Johnston	630	20	
Liberal Democrats	Jon Edwards	119	4	
Majority				
Turnout			28	
UKIP gain from Conservative		Swing		

Stanwell & Stanwell Moor
Party	Candidate	Votes	%	±%
Labour	Robert Evans	847	35	
Conservative	Colin Davis	599	25	
UKIP	Geoff Cox	588	24	
Independent	Kevin Flurry	253	11	
Liberal Democrats	Fares Georges	117	5	
Majority				
Turnout			24	
Labour hold		Swing	{{{swing}}}	

Sunbury Common & Ashford Common
Party	Candidate	Votes	%	±%
Liberal Democrats	Ian Beardsmore	1025	40	
UKIP	Mark Fowler	658	25	
Conservative	Chris Frazer	549	21	
Labour	Sarah Wrightson	358	14	
Majority				
Turnout			22	
Liberal Democrats hold		Swing		

=== Surrey Heath ===
Bagshot, Windlesham and Chobham
Party	Candidate	Votes	%	±%
Conservative	Mike Goodman	1,674	54	
UKIP	Robert Shatwell	690	22	
Labour	Richard Wilson	426	14	
Liberal Democrats	Ruth Hutchinson	333	11	
Majority		984	32	
Turnout		3,123	28	
Conservative hold		Swing		

Camberley East
Party	Candidate	Votes	%	±%
Conservative	Bill Chapman	1,323	52	−4.3
UKIP	John Bevan	753	30	14.6
Labour	Linda Philippson	454	18	8.4
Majority		570	22	−18.6
Turnout		2,530	23	−10.7
Conservative hold		Swing		

Camberley West
Party	Candidate	Votes	%	±%
Conservative	Denis Fuller	1,468	45	−5.5
Labour	Rodney Bates	991	31	21.3
UKIP	Alexander Remfry	788	24	8.4
Majority		477	14	−18.2
Turnout		3,247	28	−7.5
Conservative hold		Swing		

Frimley Green and Mytchett
Party	Candidate	Votes	%	±%
Conservative	Chris Pitt	962	36	−7.1
UKIP	Paul Chapman	867	33	21.4
Liberal Democrats	Cindy Ferguson	481	18	−24.2
Labour	Jacques Olmo	326	12	9
Majority		95	3	2.1
Turnout		2,636	25	−18
Conservative hold		Swing		

Heatherside and Parkside
Party	Candidate	Votes	%	±%
Conservative	David Ivison	1,438	52	−0.6
UKIP	Andrew Thomas	701	25	12
Liberal Democrats	Graham Tapper	431	15	−16
Labour	Paul Tonks	214	8	4
Majority		737	27	5.1
Turnout		2,784	26	−15
Conservative hold		Swing		

Lightwater, West End and Bisley
Party	Candidate	Votes	%	±%
Conservative	Adrian Page	1,562	52	
UKIP	Richard Squire	845	28	
Labour	Mick Sheehan	328	11	
Liberal Democrats	Fran Bennie	286	9	
Majority		717	14	
Turnout		3,021	26	
Conservative hold		Swing		

=== Tandridge ===
Caterham Hill
Party	Candidate	Votes	%	±%
Liberal Democrats	John Orrick	1,625	46.2	
Conservative	Eithne Webster	1,008	28.7	
UKIP	Tony Baker	688	19.6	
Labour	Etna Houldsworth	196	6	
Majority				
Turnout			33	
Liberal Democrats hold		Swing		

Caterham Valley
Party	Candidate	Votes	%	±%
Conservative	Sally Marks	1,090	40.5	
Liberal Democrats	David Lee	694	25.8	
UKIP	Jeffrey Bolter	567	21.1	
Labour	John Burgess	209	8	
Green	Les Adams	129	5	
Majority				
Turnout			30	
Conservative hold		Swing		

Godstone
Party	Candidate	Votes	%	±%
UKIP	Helena Windsor	1,213	39.9	
Conservative	Graham Knight	1,171	38.5	
Liberal Democrats	Richard Fowler	359	11.8	
Labour	Linda Baharier	257	8.5	
English Democrat	Daniel Beddoes	39	1.3	
Majority				
Turnout			33	
UKIP gain from Conservative		Swing		

Lingfield
Party	Candidate	Votes	%	±%
Conservative	Michael Sydney	1,488	55.2	
Independent	Christopher D'Avray	1,171	30	
UKIP	Graham Bailey	952	25	
Labour	Stephen Case-Green	257	7	
Majority				
Turnout			33	
Conservative hold		Swing		

Oxted
Party	Candidate	Votes	%	±%
Conservative	Nick Skellett	1,894	44.6	
UKIP	Christopher Dean	1,245	29.3	
Labour	Terry Philpot	478	11.3	
Liberal Democrats	Peter Roberts	381	9	
Green	James Thompson-Stewart	246	6	
Majority				
Turnout			36	
Conservative hold		Swing		

Warlingham
Party	Candidate	Votes	%	±%
Conservative	David Hodge	1,444	42.4	
UKIP	Martin Arthur	1,075	31.5	
Liberal Democrats	Simon Morrow	743	21.8	
Labour	Sarah MacDonnell	146	4	
Majority				
Turnout			34	
Conservative hold		Swing		

=== Waverley ===
Cranleigh & Ewhurst
Party	Candidate	Votes	%	±%
Conservative	Alan Young	1,842	51	
UKIP	Simon Brind	935	26	
Liberal Democrats	Ken Reed	523	14	
Labour	Lynda MacDermott	334	9	
Majority				
Turnout			33	
Conservative hold		Swing		

Farnham Central
Party	Candidate	Votes	%	±%
Conservative	Pat Frost	1,035	33,2	
UKIP	Bob Nockels	697	22.4	
Independent	Mike Bryan	583	18.7	
Liberal Democrats	Stewart Edge	562	18.1	
Labour	Hadleigh Roberts	236	7.6	
Majority				
Turnout			30	
Conservative hold		Swing		

Farnham North
Party	Candidate	Votes	%	±%
Conservative	Denise LeGal	1,005	32	
UKIP	Alexandra Swann	962	31	
Independent	Jerry Hyman	575	18	
Liberal Democrats	Mark Norris	349	11	
Labour	Janet Fearnley	231	7	
Majority				
Turnout			31	
Conservative hold		Swing		

Farnham South
Party	Candidate	Votes	%	±%
Conservative	David Munro	1,677	50	
UKIP	Ivo Weck	542	16	
Independent	Mark Westcott	542	16	
Independent	David Beaman	344	10	
Labour	Joan Anniballi	233	7	
Majority				
Turnout			34	
Conservative hold		Swing		

Godalming North
Party	Candidate	Votes	%	±%
Conservative	Steve Cosser	1,541	44	
Liberal Democrats	Patrick Haveron	731	21	
UKIP	Jon Swainson	659	19	
Labour	Robert Park	563	16	
Majority				
Turnout			31	
Conservative hold		Swing		

Godalming South, Milford & Witley
Party	Candidate	Votes	%	±%
Conservative	Peter Martin	2,062	57	
UKIP	Tim Clark	793	22	
Liberal Democrats	Paul Farthing	429	12	
Labour	Michael Williams	327	9	
Majority				
Turnout			33	
Conservative hold		Swing		

Haslemere
Party	Candidate	Votes	%	±%
Independent	Nikki Barton	1,208	35	
Conservative	Stephen Mulliner	1,188	35	
UKIP	Patricia Culligan	573	17	
Labour	Nick Scales	154	5	
Liberal Democrats	Peter Nicholson	285	8	
Majority				
Turnout			35	
Independent gain from Conservative		Swing		

Waverley Eastern Villages
Party	Candidate	Votes	%	±%
Conservative	Victoria Young	2,039	59	
UKIP	Hugo Alexander	744	22	
Liberal Democrats	Richard Cole	366	11	
Labour	Tony Johnson	311	9	
Majority				
Turnout			32	
Conservative win (new seat)				

Waverley Western Villages
Party	Candidate	Votes	%	±%
Conservative	David Harmer	1,880	61	
UKIP	Gail Weingartner	693	22	
Liberal Democrats	Geoffrey Whitby	299	10	
Labour	Andrew Desmond	231	7	
Majority				
Turnout			32	
Conservative hold		Swing		

=== Woking ===
Goldsworth East and Horsell Village
Party	Candidate	Votes	%	±%
Conservative	Colin Kemp	1,343	36	
Liberal Democrats	Ann-Marie Barker	1,249	34	
UKIP	Howard Earl	681	18	
Labour	Akhil Viren	441	12	
Majority				
Turnout		3,728	33.01	
Conservative gain from Liberal Democrats		Swing		

Knaphill and Goldsworth West
Party	Candidate	Votes	%	±%
Conservative	Saj Hussain	1,771	49	
Liberal Democrats	Tina Liddington	716	20	
UKIP	Matthew Davies	537	15	
Independent	Martin Dunham	352	10	
Labour	Paul Brown	255	7	
Majority				
Turnout		3,642	33.05	
Conservative gain from Liberal Democrats		Swing		

The Byfleets
Party	Candidate	Votes	%	±%
Conservative	Richard Wilson	1,476	50.3	
UKIP	Terry Knight	597	20.3	
Liberal Democrats	Andy Grimshaw	533	18.2	
Labour	Anthony William Mullins	231	7.9	
BNP	Chris Jones	98	3.3	
Majority				
Turnout		2,945	29.40	
Conservative hold		Swing		

Woking North
Party	Candidate	Votes	%	±%
Conservative	Ben Carasco	1,456	36	
Labour	Mohammad Raja	1,305	32	
Liberal Democrats	Muhammed Imran	672	17	
UKIP	Timothy Shaw	565	14	
UK Community Issues Party	Michael Osman	43	1	
Majority				
Turnout		4,062	36.87	
Conservative hold		Swing		

Woking South
Party	Candidate	Votes	%	±%
Liberal Democrats	Will Forster	1,449	43.5	
Conservative	Simon Bellord	963	28.9	
UKIP	Rob Burberry	575	17.3	
Labour	Stephen William Tudhope	270	8.1	
Peace	Julie Roxburgh	75	2.3	
Majority				
Turnout		3,336	30.79	
Liberal Democrats hold		Swing		

Woking South East
Party	Candidate	Votes	%	±%
Conservative	Liz Bowes	1,843	58	
UKIP	Robin Milner	618	19	
Liberal Democrats	Liam Lyons	407	13	
Labour	Alex Denning	318	10	
Majority				
Turnout		3,198	31.42	
Conservative hold		Swing		

Woking South West
Party	Candidate	Votes	%	±%
Conservative	Linda Kemeny	1,339	48	
UKIP	Marcia Taylor	589	21	
Liberal Democrats	Ken Howard	564	20	
Labour	Tom Willis	293	11	
Majority				
Turnout		2,796	29.24	
Conservative hold		Swing		
