= 2017 Surrey County Council election =

2017 UK local government election

- 4 May 2017

All 81 seats to Surrey County Council 41 seats needed for a majority
- Turnout: 36%
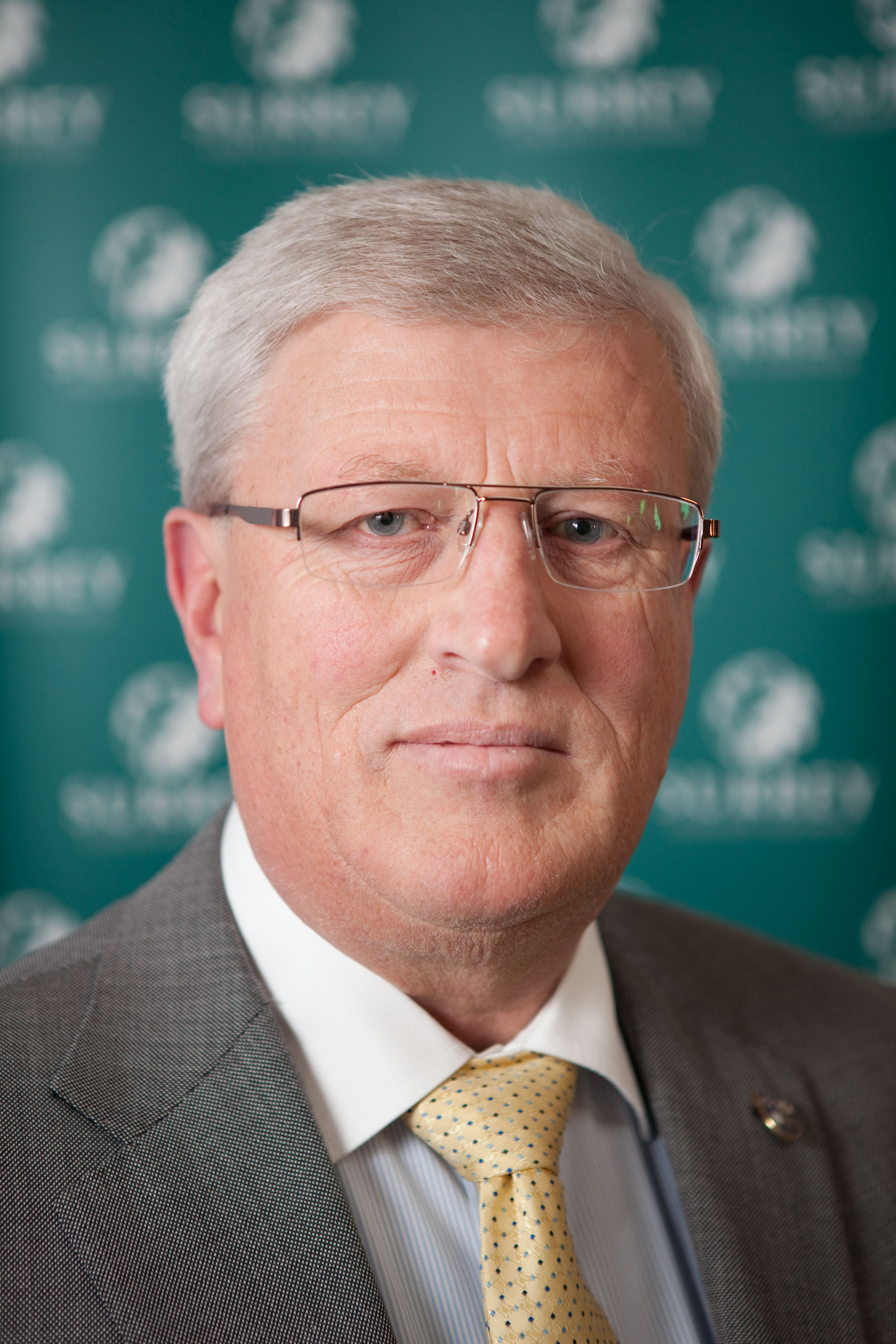
	First party	Second party	Third party
Leader	David Hodge	Hazel Watson	Nick Darby
Party	Conservative	Liberal Democrats	RA
Leader's seat	Warlingham
Last election	58	9	8
Seats won	61	9	8
Seat change	▲3	-	-
	Fourth party	Fifth party	Sixth party
Party	Independents	Green	Labour
Last election	1	1	1
Seats won	1	1	1
Seat change	-	-	-
- Map showing the results of the election in each division

The 2017 Surrey County Council election took place as part of the 2017 local elections in the UK to elect all 81 councillors to Surrey County Council for single-member electoral divisions for a four-year term. The electoral system used was first-past-the-post voting.

The result was that Conservative councillors formed an increased majority on the council, having won back all three of the divisions gained from them by UKIP at the previous election in 2013.

Two second-largest party groupings of councillors remained tied on nine seats each, as in the results of the previous election. These were the Liberal Democrats and an informal alliance of Independent and Residents Association councillors, with both groups securing nine councillors each.

The Conservatives and the Liberal Democrats both won two seats off each other.

The Conservatives won two further seats - one from an independent in Haslemere (who didn’t re-stand) and one from the Esher and Molesey Residents’ Associations in the East Molesey and Esher division. However, the Conservatives also lost two out of the three divisions that they were defending in Farnham to the Independent Farnham Residents group.

The balance of two councillors on the Council continued to be the same as before: one Labour Party member and one Green Party of England and Wales member each secured re-election in their divisions.

== Results summary ==
2017 Surrey County Council election
Party	Seats	Gains	Losses	Net gain/loss	Seats %	Votes %	Votes	+/−
Conservative	61	7	4	+3		48.7	148,534	
Liberal Democrats	9	2	2	0		23.0	70,139	
Independents and Residents' Associations	9			0		9.7	29,446	
Labour	1	0	0	0		9.5	29,047	
Green	1	0	0	0		4.2	12,795	
UKIP	0	0	3	-3		4.9	14,935	

The informal alliance of Independents and Residents’ Associations gained two divisions but also lost two divisions; all four in contests with the Conservatives.

Eleven divisions in all changed hands between the 2013 SCC election and the 2017 SCC election, all involving wins or losses for the Conservative Party.

== Division results ==
An asterisk * indicates an incumbent seeking re-election.

=== Addlestone ===
Addlestone
Party	Candidate	Votes	%	±%
Conservative	John Furey*	1,804	54	+14.4
Labour	June Tilbury	648	19	−1.4
UKIP	Nicolas Wood	356	11	−20.9
Liberal Democrats	Chelsea Whyte	324	10	+4
Green	Richard Miller	232	7	n/a
Majority		1156	35	+27.3
Turnout		3364	31	+6
Conservative hold		Swing		

=== Ash ===
Ash
Party	Candidate	Votes	%	±%
Conservative	Marsha Moseley*	1,675	60	+13
Liberal Democrats	Caroline Johnson	528	19	−1
Labour	Jacob Armani	249	9	−3
UKIP	Kyle Greaves	192	7	−14
Green	Neil Jameson	152	5	n/a
Majority		1147	41	+15
Turnout		2796	28	0
Conservative hold		Swing		

=== Ashford ===
Ashford
Party	Candidate	Votes	%	±%
Conservative	Naz Islam	1,725	47	+3
UKIP	Paul West	591	16	−17
Labour	Rebecca Geach	564	15	−2
Independent	Frank Ayres	357	10	n/a
Liberal Democrats	Thomas Fidler	271	7	+2
Green	Rupert Jackson	177	5	n/a
Majority		1134	31	+20
Turnout		3685	34	+6.57
Conservative hold		Swing		

=== Ashtead ===
Ashtead
Party	Candidate	Votes	%	±%
Independent	Christopher Townsend*	2,763	54	+1
Conservative	Chris Hunt	1777	35	+4
Liberal Democrats	Sebastian Bate	225	4	+2
Labour	Susan Gilchrist	194	4	0
Green	Tony Cooper	123	2	n/a
Majority		986	19	−3
Turnout		5082	45	+6.49
Independent hold		Swing		

At the previous election the UKIP candidate polled 11%

=== Bagshot, Windlesham and Chobham ===
Bagshot, Windlesham and Chobham
Party	Candidate	Votes	%	±%
Conservative	Mike Goodman*	2,437	62	+8
Liberal Democrats	Sam Kay	679	17	+6
Green	Andrew Willgoss	579	15	n/a
Labour	Paul Edwards	219	6	−8
Majority		1758	45	+13
Turnout		3914	36	+8
Conservative hold		Swing		

In the previous election the UKIP candidate polled 22%.

=== Banstead, Woodmansterne & Chipstead ===
Banstead, Woodmansterne & Chipstead
Party	Candidate	Votes	%	±%
Conservative	Ken Gulati*	2,414	67	+17
Liberal Democrats	James Fowler	529	15	+7
Labour	Evan Gregory	276	8	n/a
UKIP	Gillian Grant	238	7	−26
Green	Phil Wilson	165	5	−4
Majority		1885	52	+35.2
Turnout		3622	33	+7
Conservative hold		Swing		

=== Bookham and Fetcham West ===
Bookham and Fetcham West
Party	Candidate	Votes	%	±%
Conservative	Clare Curran*	3,256	51	+6
Liberal Democrats	Raj Haque	2604	41	+15
Green	Damian McDevitt	288	4	n/a
UKIP	Marjorie Dixon	253	4	−19
Majority		652	10	−10
Turnout		6401	54	+15
Conservative hold		Swing		

=== Camberley East ===
Camberley East
Party	Candidate	Votes	%	±%
Conservative	Bill Chapman*	2,233	71	+19
Liberal Democrats	David Whitcroft	511	16	n/a
Labour	Bernard Collins	402	13	−5
Majority		1722	56	+34
Turnout		3146	29	+6
Conservative hold		Swing		

At the previous election the UKIP candidate polled 30%.

=== Camberley West ===
Camberley West
Party	Candidate	Votes	%	±%
Conservative	Charlotte Morley	1,839	51	+6
Labour	Richard Claridge	621	17	−14
Independent	David Allen	394	11	n/a
Liberal Democrats	Morgan Rise	328	9	n/a
Independent	Frances Halstead	300	8	n/a
UKIP	Damian Heads	151	4	−20
Majority		1218	34	+20
Turnout		3633	31	+3
Conservative hold		Swing		

=== Caterham Hill ===
Caterham Hill
Party	Candidate	Votes	%	±%
Liberal Democrats	Chris Botten	1,738	44	−2
Conservative	Rod Stead	1,726	44	+15
Labour	Eddington Pindura	262	7	+1
UKIP	Joe Branco	197	5	−15
Majority		12	0	−17.5
Turnout		3923	36	+3
Liberal Democrats hold		Swing		

=== Caterham Valley ===
Caterham Valley
Party	Candidate	Votes	%	±%
Liberal Democrats	David Lee	1,589	47	+21
Conservative	Michael Cooper	1343	40	−0.5
Labour	Mark Wood	242	7	−1
UKIP	Jeffrey Bolter	172	5	−16
Majority		246	7	
Turnout		3346	36	+6
Liberal Democrats gain from Conservative		Swing		

In the previous election a Green Party candidate polled 5%.

=== Chertsey ===
Chertsey
Party	Candidate	Votes	%	±%
Conservative	Mark Nuti	1,978	59	+17
Labour	Arran Neathey	650	19	−7.7
Liberal Democrats	Sylvia Whyte	381	11	n/a
UKIP	Bill Bruno	326	10	−21.4
Majority		1328	40	+29.5
Turnout		3335	31	+3
Conservative hold		Swing		

=== Cobham ===
Cobham
Party	Candidate	Votes	%	±%
Conservative	Mary Lewis*	2,290	67	+10
Liberal Democrats	David Bellchamber	679	20	+9
Labour	Lana Hylands	254	7	0
UKIP	Elaine Kingston	175	5	−19
Majority		1611	47	+14
Turnout		3398	33	+7.15
Conservative hold		Swing		

=== Cranleigh & Ewhurst ===
Cranleigh & Ewhurst
Party	Candidate	Votes	%	±%
Conservative	Andrew Povey	2,094	54	+3
Liberal Democrats	Richard Cole	1098	28	+14
UKIP	Roseleen Egan	362	9	−17
Labour	Luke Wenman	334	9	0
Majority		996	26	+1
Turnout		3888	37	+4
Conservative hold		Swing		

=== Dorking Hills ===
Dorking Hills
Party	Candidate	Votes	%	±%
Liberal Democrats	Hazel Watson*	2,906	57	+11
Conservative	David Mir	1675	33	+6
Green	Jacquetta Fewster	231	4	−1
UKIP	David Payne	167	3	−16
Labour	Emma Davies	155	3	0
Majority		1231	24	+5
Turnout		5134	48	+7
Liberal Democrats hold		Swing		

=== Dorking Rural ===
Dorking Rural
Party	Candidate	Votes	%	±%
Conservative	Helyn Clack*	2,580	54	+14
Liberal Democrats	Roger Abbott	1695	35	+1
UKIP	Geoff Cox	248	5	−16
Green	Jeff Zie	164	3	n/a
Labour	Angus Rendall	125	3	−3
Majority		885	19	+13
Turnout		4812	44	+3
Conservative hold		Swing		

=== Dorking South and the Holmwoods ===
Dorking South and the Holmwoods
Party	Candidate	Votes	%	±%
Liberal Democrats	Stephen Cooksey*	2,261	51	+9
Conservative	Roger Jones	1466	33	+6
Green	Chris Crook	256	6	n/a
UKIP	Michael Foulston	205	5	−16
Labour	Peter Horitz	204	5	−4
Majority		795	18	+3
Turnout		4392	42	+4
Liberal Democrats hold		Swing		

=== Earlswood and Reigate South ===
Earlswood and Reigate South
Party	Candidate	Votes	%	±%
Conservative	Barbara Thomas*	1,621	48	+15
Labour	Graham Wildridge	633	19	−2
Liberal Democrats	Moray Carey	488	14	+7
UKIP	Brian Stiff	353	10	−21
Green	Sue Fenton	235	9	+1
Majority		988	29	+27
Turnout		3330	33	+4.59
Conservative hold		Swing		

=== East Molesey and Esher ===
East Molesey & Esher
Party	Candidate	Votes	%	±%
Conservative	Peter Szanto	2,095	54	+13
Residents	Elizabeth Cooper	1149	30	−11
Liberal Democrats	Paul Nagle	318	8	+6
Labour	Raymond Kelly	159	4	
Green	Laura Harmour	102	3	n/a
UKIP	Trevor Marshall	66	2	−9
Majority		946	24	+24
Turnout		3889	40	+11.39
Conservative gain from Residents		Swing	12	

=== Egham ===
Egham
Party	Candidate	Votes	%	±%
Conservative	Yvonna Lay*	1,104	49	+6.5
Labour	Fiona Dent	464	21	+1
Liberal Democrats	Jake Short	299	13	+3
UKIP	David Roe	224	10	−18
Green	Fergus Munro	147	7	n/a
Majority		640	28	+13.5
Turnout		2238	28	+7
Conservative hold		Swing		

=== Englefield Green ===
Englefield Green
Party	Candidate	Votes	%	±%
Conservative	Marisa Heath*	1,169	41	−2
Runnymeade Independent Residents Group	Chris Fisher	809	29	n/a
Labour	Ben Tozer	307	11	−5
Liberal Democrats	Will Coles	255	9	+2
UKIP	David Hunt	148	5	−19
Green	Lee-Anne Lawrence	138	5	−5
Majority		360	12	−7.4
Turnout		2826	29	+9.5
Conservative hold		Swing		

=== Epsom Town & Downs ===
Epsom Town & Downs
Party	Candidate	Votes	%	±%
Conservative	Tina Mountain*	1,751	42	+3
Residents	Clive Woodbridge	1321	32	+4
Liberal Democrats	Julie Anne Morris	612	15	+4
Labour	Veronica Monks	347	8	
Green	Theresa MacIntyre	138	3	n/a
Majority		430	10	−1
Turnout		4169	37	+4
Conservative hold		Swing		

At the previous election the UKIP candidate polled 13%.

=== Epsom West ===
Epsom West
Party	Candidate	Votes	%	±%
Conservative	Bernie Muir	1,218	30	+17
Liberal Democrats	Clare Clark	1144	28	0
Labour	Kate Chinn	839	21	+1
Residents	Barry Nash	717	18	−5
Green	Janice Baker	165	4	n/a
Majority		74	2	
Turnout		4083	37	+8
Conservative gain from Liberal Democrats		Swing		

At the previous election the UKIP candidate polled 16%

=== Ewell ===
Ewell
Party	Candidate	Votes	%	±%
Residents	John Beckett*	2,579	66	+3
Conservative	James Tarbit	732	19	+8
Labour	Rosalind Godson	255	7	+2
Liberal Democrats	Alison Kelly	234	6	+3
Green	Susan McGrath	79	2	n/a
Majority		1847	47	0
Turnout		3879	33	+6
Residents hold		Swing		

At the previous election the UKIP candidate polled 16%

=== Ewell Court, Auriol & Cuddington ===
Ewell Court, Auriol & Cuddington
Party	Candidate	Votes	%	±%
Residents	Eber Kington*	2,708	68	+4
Conservative	Karan Persand	776	19	+10
Labour	Erica Gregory	254	6	0
Liberal Democrats	Paul Coulter	180	4	+1
Green	Lucy Barford	92	2	n/a
Majority		1932	49	+3
Turnout		4010	34	+6
Residents hold		Swing		

At the previous election the UKIP candidate polled 18%.

=== Farnham Central ===
Farnham Central
Party	Candidate	Votes	%	±%
Farnham Residents	Andy MacLeod	1,754	43	n/a
Liberal Democrats	Jo Aylwin	1,085	27	+9
Conservative	Pat Frost*	1,057	26	−7
Green	Fiona Scimone	164	4	n/a
Majority		669	16	n/a
Turnout		4060	41	+11
Farnham Residents gain from Conservative		Swing		

At the previous election the UKIP candidate polled 22%, the Independent candidate polled 19% and the Labour candidate polled 8%.

=== Farnham North ===
Farnham North
Party	Candidate	Votes	%	±%
Farnham Residents	Stephen Spence	1606	45	n/a
Conservative	Mike Hodge	1274	36	+4
Liberal Democrats	Rob Walton	437	12	+1
Green	Dave Beynon	230	6	n/a
Majority		332	9	n/a
Turnout		3547	36	+5
Farnham Residents gain from Conservative		Swing		

At the previous election the UKIP candidate polled 31%, an independent candidate polled 18% and Labour polled 7%.

=== Farnham South ===
Farnham South
Party	Candidate	Votes	%	±%
Conservative	Robert Ramsdale	1,526	39	−11
Farnham Residents	John Ward	1463	37	n/a
Liberal Democrats	Mark Turner	550	14	+4
Labour	Andrew Jones	148	4	−3
Independent	Mark Westcott	140	4	n/a
UKIP	Jim Burroughs	86	2	−14
Majority		63	2	n/a
Turnout		3913	40	+6
Conservative hold		Swing		

=== Foxhills, Thorpe and Virginia Water ===
Foxhills, Thorpe and Virginia Water
Party	Candidate	Votes	%	±%
Conservative	Mel Few*	2,314	65	+12
Liberal Democrats	Don Whyte	462	13	+7
Labour	Jacqueline Fletcher	333	9	−3.4
UKIP	Steve Gynn	321	9	−19.6
Green	Tobias Horkan	116	3	n/a
Majority		1852	52	+27.6
Turnout		2314	34	+7
Conservative hold		Swing		

=== Frimley Green and Mytchett ===
Frimley Green and Mytchett
Party	Candidate	Votes	%	±%
Conservative	Paul Deach	2,103	61	+25
Liberal Democrats	Cindy Ferguson	672	19	+1
Labour	Jenniann Davies	267	8	−4
UKIP	Paul Chapman	252	7	−26
Green	Peter Barnett	129	4	n/a
Christian	Juliana Brimicombe	52	1	n/a
Majority		1431	42	+39
Turnout		3475	33	+8
Conservative hold		Swing		

=== Godalming North ===
Godalming North
Party	Candidate	Votes	%	±%
Liberal Democrats	Penny Rivers	1,895	46	+25
Conservative	Steve Cosser*	1656	40	−4
Green	James Coope	349	8	n/a
UKIP	Brian Egan	254	6	−13
Majority		239	6	
Turnout		4154	37	+6
Liberal Democrats gain from Conservative		Swing		

At the previous election the Labour candidate polled 16%.

=== Godalming South, Milford & Witley ===
Godalming South, Milford & Witley
Party	Candidate	Votes	%	±%
Conservative	Peter Martin	2,484	62	+5
Liberal Democrats	Paul Follows	952	24	+12
Labour	Kate Townsend	542	14	+5
Majority		1532	38	+3
Turnout		3978	37	+4
Conservative hold		Swing		

At the previous election the UKIP candidate polled 22%.

=== Godstone ===
Godstone
Party	Candidate	Votes	%	±%
Conservative	Rose Thorn	1,646	47	+8.5
UKIP	Helena Windsor*	949	27	−12.9
Liberal Democrats	Tamzie Hollands	613	18	+6.2
Labour	Linda Baharier	290	8	0
Majority		697	20	+18.6
Turnout		3498	37	+4
Conservative gain from UKIP		Swing		

=== Goldsworth East and Horsell Village ===
Goldsworth East and Horsell Village
Party	Candidate	Votes	%	±%
Conservative	Colin Kemp*	1,934	43	+7
Liberal Democrats	John Doran	1876	42	+8
Labour	John Scott-Morgan	463	10	−2
UKIP	Tim Read	241	5	−13
Majority		58	1	−1
Turnout		4514	41	+8
Conservative hold		Swing		

=== Guildford East ===
Guildford East
Party	Candidate	Votes	%	±%
Conservative	Graham Ellwood*	1,910	45	−5
Liberal Democrats	George Potter	1495	35	+10
Labour	Richard Mithen	505	12	+2
Green	Sam Peters	304	7	n/a
Majority		415	10	−15
Turnout		4214	41	+5
Conservative hold		Swing		

At the previous election the UKIP candidate polled 15%.

=== Guildford North ===
Guildford North
Party	Candidate	Votes	%	±%
Liberal Democrats	Angela Goodwin	1,564	42	+7
Conservative	David Snipp	1250	33	+9
Labour	Anne Rouse	724	19	−1
Green	Paul Stevenson	206	6	n/a
Majority		314	9	−2
Turnout		3744	34	+7
Liberal Democrats hold		Swing		

At the previous election the UKIP candidate polled 21%.

=== Guildford South-East ===
Guildford South-East
Party	Candidate	Votes	%	±%
Conservative	Mark Brett-Warburton*	2,073	51	−2
Liberal Democrats	Leonie Anderson	1641	40	+14
Labour	Howard Smith	355	9	0
Majority		432	11	−16
Turnout		4069	40	+7
Conservative hold		Swing		

At the previous election the UKIP candidate polled 12%.

=== Guildford South-West ===
Guildford South-West
Party	Candidate	Votes	%	±%
Liberal Democrats	David Goodwin*	1,975	51	+13
Conservative	Bob Hughes	1128	31	−2
Labour	Matthew Smith	330	9	−4
Green	Mark Bray-Parry	208	6	n/a
Peace	Chapel Kabir	34	1	−3
Majority		847	20	+15
Turnout		3675	37	+8
Liberal Democrats hold		Swing		

At the previous election the UKIP candidate polled 13%.

=== Guildford West ===
Guildford West
Party	Candidate	Votes	%	±%
Liberal Democrats	Fiona White*	955	43	+8
Labour Co-op	George Dokimakis	573	26	+2
Conservative	Adrian Chandler	567	26	+10
Green	Jo Purvis	71	3	n/a
Peace	John Morris	38	2	−3
Socialist (GB)	Adam Buick	12	1	n/a
Majority		382	17	+6
Turnout		2216	29	+9
Liberal Democrats hold		Swing		

At the previous election the UKIP candidate polled 21%.

=== Haslemere ===
Haslemere
Party	Candidate	Votes	%	±%
Conservative	Richard Hampson	1,849	53	+18
Liberal Democrats	John Robini	990	28	+20
Green	Jon Taylor	304	9	n/a
Labour	Kim Hemmingway	200	6	+1
UKIP	Gail Weingartner	164	5	−12
Majority		859	25	+25
Turnout		3507	37	+2
Conservative gain from Independent		Swing		

At the previous election the Independent candidate polled 35%.

=== Heatherside and Parkside ===
Heatherside and Parkside
Party	Candidate	Votes	%	±%
Conservative	Edward Hawkins	2,041	54	+2
Liberal Democrats	John Skipper	638	17	+2
Independent	David Ivison*	466	12	n/a
Labour	Jill Coles	216	6	−2
UKIP	Hazel Prowse	179	5	−20
Green	Yvonne Greenwood	153	4	n/a
Independent	Barrie Cullen	75	2	n/a
Majority		1403	37	+10
Turnout		3768	36	+10
Conservative gain from Independent		Swing		

At the previous election David Ivison won the seat for the Conservatives, so this division is a HOLD in relation to the previous election in 2013.

=== Hersham ===
Hersham
Party	Candidate	Votes	%	±%
Conservative	John O'Reilly	2,146	54	+14
Hersham Village Society	Roy Green	981	25	−10
Labour	Peter Ramsbottom	296	8	+1
Liberal Democrats	Michael Smith	287	7	+3
Green	Olivia Palmer	230	6	n/a
Majority		1165	29	+24
Turnout		3940	38	+5.2
Conservative hold		Swing		

At the previous election a UKIP candidate polled 14%

=== Hinchley Wood, Claygate & Oxshott ===
Hinchley Wood, Claygate & Oxshott
Party	Candidate	Votes	%	±%
Conservative	Mike Bennison*	2,395	50	
Liberal Democrats	Alastair Coomes	2,269	47	+17
UKIP	Bernard Collignon	157	3	−12
Majority		126	3	−17
Turnout		4,821	40	+7.52
Conservative hold		Swing		

=== Horley East ===
Horley East
Party	Candidate	Votes	%	±%
Conservative	Graham Knight	1,990	60	+13
Labour	Linda Mabbett	494	15	+4
UKIP	Malcolm Brighting	386	12	−19
Liberal Democrats	Judith Sykes	298	9	0
Green	David Scoffield	172	5	n/a
Majority		1496	45	+29
Turnout		3340	32	+7.52
Conservative hold		Swing		

=== Horley West, Salfords and Sidlow ===
Horley West, Salfords and Sidlow
Party	Candidate	Votes	%	±%
Conservative	Kay Hammond*	1,697	55	+13
Labour	Tom Turner	434	14	0
UKIP	Joseph Fox	429	14	−22
Liberal Democrats	Geoffrey Southall	215	12	+3
Green	Muriel Passmore	155	5	n/a
Majority		1263	41	+35
Turnout		2930	32	+6.28
Conservative hold		Swing		

=== Horsleys ===
Horsleys
Party	Candidate	Votes	%	±%
Conservative	Julie Iles	2,450	54	−6
Liberal Democrats	Paul Kennedy	1731	38	+26
Green	Ann James	134	3	n/a
UKIP	Robert Cane	108	2	−19
Labour	Carolyn Fiddes	108	2	−5
Majority		719	16	−23
Turnout		4531	46	+10
Conservative hold		Swing		

=== Knaphill and Goldsworth West ===
Knaphill and Goldsworth West
Party	Candidate	Votes	%	±%
Conservative	Saj Hussain*	2,342	63	+14
Liberal Democrats	Ann-Marie Barker	804	22	+2
Labour	Peter Ford	356	10	+3
UKIP	Troy De Leon	203	5	−10
Majority		1538	41	+12
Turnout		3705	34	+1
Conservative hold		Swing		

At the preceding election, an independent candidate polled 10%.

=== Laleham and Shepperton ===
Laleham and Shepperton
Party	Candidate	Votes	%	±%
Conservative	Richard Walsh*	2,171	54	+1
Independent	Stuart Boyle	665	17	n/a
Labour	Jon Button	396	10	−2
Liberal Democrats	Richard Dunn	349	9	+1
UKIP	Brian Catt	271	7	−21
Green	Peter Hughes	155	4	n/a
Majority		1506	37	+12
Turnout		4007	39	+8
Conservative hold		Swing		

=== Leatherhead and Fetcham East ===
Leatherhead and Fetcham East
Party	Candidate	Votes	%	±%
Conservative	Tim Hall*	2,295	53	+11
Liberal Democrats	Clare Malcolmson	1259	29	+8
Labour	Marc Green	354	8	0
UKIP	Michael Heelas	251	6	−22
Green	Julian Everett	148	3	n/a
Majority		1036	24	+10
Turnout		4307	37	+5.5
Conservative hold		Swing		

=== Lightwater, West End and Bisley ===
Lightwater, West End and Bisley
Party	Candidate	Votes	%	±%
Conservative	David Mansfield	2,109	55	+3
Independent	Graham Alleway	627	16	n/a
Liberal Democrats	Rob Beere	613	16	+7
Labour	Mick Sheehan	223	6	−5
Green	Sharon Galliford	139	4	n/a
UKIP	Piotr Farbiszewski	128	3	−25
Majority		1482	39	+25
Turnout		3839	33	+7
Conservative hold		Swing		

=== Lingfield ===
Lingfield
Party	Candidate	Votes	%	±%
Conservative	Lesley Steeds	2,853	69	+13.8
Liberal Democrats	Dave Wilkes	635	15	n/a
UKIP	Richard Grant	378	9	−16
Labour	Elizabeth Warwick-Ching	286	7	0
Majority		2218	54	+28.8
Turnout		4152	34	+1
Conservative hold		Swing		

At the previous election the Independent candidate polled 30%.

=== Lower Sunbury & Halliford ===
Lower Sunbury & Halliford
Party	Candidate	Votes	%	±%
Conservative	Tim Evans*	1,945	51	+14
Liberal Democrats	Sandra Dunn	1211	32	−2
Labour	Sean Beatty	319	8	n/a
UKIP	Redvers Cunningham	223	6	−23
Green	Steve Trafford	102	3	n/a
Majority		734	19	+16
Turnout		3800	36	+7
Conservative hold		Swing		

=== Merstham and Banstead South ===
Merstham and Banstead South
Party	Candidate	Votes	%	±%
Conservative	Bob Gardner*	1,647	55	+11
Labour	Stewart Dack	489	16	−2
Liberal Democrats	Christopher Howell	416	16	+5
UKIP	Leigh Jones	275	9	−19
Green	Kumari Lane	185	6	n/a
Majority		1158	39	+23
Turnout		3012	30	+4.67
Conservative hold		Swing		

=== Nork and Tattenhams ===
Nork and Tattenhams
Party	Candidate	Votes	%	±%
Residents	Nick Harrison*	2,470	64	+10
Conservative	Alex Clarke	971	25	+9
Liberal Democrats	Stephen Gee	184	5	+2
Labour	Kimberley Griffin	166	4	+1
Green	Alistair Morten	78	2	
Majority		1499	39	+3
Turnout		3869	32	+4
Residents' Association hold		Swing		

At the previous election the UKIP candidate polled 18%.

=== Oxted ===
Oxted
Party	Candidate	Votes	%	±%
Conservative	Cameron McIntosh	2,457	50	+5.4
Liberal Democrats	Craig Shepherd	878	18	+9
Labour	Katherine Saunders	698	14	+2.7
UKIP	Christopher Dean	478	10	−19.3
Green	Benedict Southworth	362	7	+1
Majority		1579	32	+16.7
Turnout		4873	41	+5
Conservative hold		Swing		

=== Redhill East ===
Redhill East
Party	Candidate	Votes	%	±%
Green	Jonathan Essex*	1,849	53	+3
Conservative	Frank Kelly	879	25	+3
Labour	Toby Brampton	350	10	−2
Liberal Democrats	Stuart Holmes	250	7	+3
UKIP	Laurence Clack	134	4	−9
Majority		970	28	0
Turnout		3462	34	+5
Green hold		Swing		

=== Redhill West and Meadvale ===
Redhill West and Meadvale
Party	Candidate	Votes	%	±%
Conservative	Natalie Bramhall*	1,661	43	+13
Green	Rob Jarrett	862	22	+1
Liberal Democrats	Peter Lambell	769	20	+2
Labour	David Heydon	425	11	0
UKIP	Tim Pearson	158	4	−15
Majority		799	21	+12
Turnout		3875	38	+5.77
Conservative hold		Swing		

=== Reigate ===
Reigate
Party	Candidate	Votes	%	±%
Conservative	Zully Grant-Duff*	2,157	52	+3
Liberal Democrats	John Vincent	1263	31	+13
Green	Liz Wakefield	283	7	−1
Labour	Robin Spencer	257	6	−3
UKIP	Phyll Cambridge	149	4	=12
Majority		894	21	−10
Turnout		4109	39	+8
Conservative hold		Swing		

=== Shalford ===
Shalford
Party	Candidate	Votes	%	±%
Conservative	Matt Furniss	2,036	55	n/a
Liberal Democrats	James Steel	480	13	−24
GGG	Nick Norton	401	11	n/a
UKIP	George Johnson*	312	8	−43
Labour	Mark Redhead	241	7	−2
Green	Fran Aslin	208	6	n/a
Majority		1556	42	+28
Turnout		3678	35	+8
Conservative gain from UKIP		Swing		

=== Shere ===
Shere
Party	Candidate	Votes	%	±%
Conservative	Keith Taylor*	2,207	62	+5
Liberal Democrats	Tom Hunt	713	20	+9
Green	Vicki Elcoate	391	11	n/a
Labour	Robin Woof	256	7	−2
Majority		1494	42	+8
Turnout		3567	37	+3
Conservative hold		Swing		

At the previous election the UKIP candidate polled 23%.

=== Staines ===
Staines
Party	Candidate	Votes	%	±%
Conservative	Sinead Mooney	1,455	41	−6
UKIP	Denise Saliagopoulos*	718	20	−2
Labour	John Johnston	589	16	+3
Liberal Democrats	Nichola Cornes	571	16	+7
Green	Elizabeth Mansfield	208	6	−2
TUSC	Matt Clarke	46	1	n/a
Majority		737	21	−4
Turnout		3587	34	+8
Conservative hold		Swing		

=== Staines South & Ashford West ===
Staines South & Ashford West
Party	Candidate	Votes	%	±%
Conservative	Denise Turner-Stewart*	1,914	53	+15
Labour	Suzanne Gulbrandson	589	16	−4
UKIP	Chris Beresford	530	15	−23
Liberal Democrats	Christopher Bateson	448	12	+8
Green	Anoma Jacobs	118	3	n/a
Majority		1325	37	37
Turnout		3599	33	+5
Conservative gain from UKIP		Swing		

=== Stanwell & Stanwell Moor ===
Stanwell & Stanwell Moor
Party	Candidate	Votes	%	±%
Labour	Robert Evans *	1,294	46	+11
Conservative	John Boughtflower	1080	38	+13
UKIP	Gerald Gravett	318	11	−13
Liberal Democrats	Terrence Lewis	114	4	−1
Majority		214	8	−2
Turnout		2806	26	+2
Labour hold		Swing		

At the preceding election an independent candidate polled 11%.

=== Sunbury Common & Ashford Common ===
Sunbury Common & Ashford Common
Party	Candidate	Votes	%	±%
Conservative	Alison Griffiths	1,406	44	+23
Liberal Democrats	Ian Beardsmore*	1041	33	−7
Labour	Susan Bryer	402	13	−1
UKIP	Peter Appleford	266	8	−17
Green	Paul Jacobs	80	3	n/a
Majority		356	11	−4
Turnout		3195	28	+6
Conservative gain from Liberal Democrats		Swing		

=== Tadworth, Walton and Kingswood ===
Tadworth, Walton and Kingswood
Party	Candidate	Votes	%	±%
Conservative	Jeffrey Harris	2,596	71	+18
Liberal Democrats	Stephen Kulka	313	9	+2
UKIP	Valerie Moore	285	8	−24
Labour	David Burnley	260	7	n/a
Green	Roger Ponsford	202	6	−2
Majority		2283	62	+41
Turnout		3656	33	+6.27
Conservative hold		Swing		

=== The Byfleets ===
The Byfleets
Party	Candidate	Votes	%	±%
Conservative	Richard Wilson*	1,536	41	−9
Independent	John Edwin Bond	1203	32	n/a
Liberal Democrats	Anne Roberts	650	18	0
Labour	Alex Wilks	198	5	−3
UKIP	Lyn Sage	122	3	−17
Majority		333	9	−21
Turnout		3709	37	+7
Conservative hold		Swing		

=== The Dittons ===
The Dittons
Party	Candidate	Votes	%	±%
Residents	Nick Darby	2,515	57	+2
Conservative	Bruce Finch	1001	23	+5
Liberal Democrats	Gerard Doherty	724	16	+10
Labour	Rosemary Rendall	201	5	−1
Majority		1514	34	−3
Turnout		4441	38	+8.99
Residents hold		Swing		

At the previous election a UKIP candidate polled 14%

=== Walton ===
Walton
Party	Candidate	Votes	%	±%
Conservative	Rachael Lake*	1,813	53	+16
Liberal Democrats	Chris Elmer	753	22	+19
Labour	Richard Leonard	620	18	+7
UKIP	David Ions	257	7	−9
Majority		1060	31	+26
Turnout		3443	30	+4.75
Conservative hold		Swing		

At the previous election a Walton Society candidate polled 32%

=== Walton South & Oatlands ===
Walton South & Oatlands
Party	Candidate	Votes	%	±%
Conservative	Tony Samuels*	2,351	62	+5
Liberal Democrats	Adriana Dredge	862	23	+12
Labour	Warren Weertman	378	10	−2
UKIP	Simon Kadwill-Kelly	194	5	−15
Majority		1489	39	+2
Turnout		3785	34	+7.01
Conservative hold		Swing		

=== Warlingham ===
Warlingham
Party	Candidate	Votes	%	±%
Conservative	David Hodge*	2,265	56	+13.6
Liberal Democrats	Charles Lister	1165	29	+7.2
UKIP	Roger Bird	403	10	−21.5
Labour	Jenifer Dugdale	146	5	+1
Majority		1100	27	+16
Turnout		3979	40	+6
Conservative hold		Swing		

=== Waverley Eastern Villages ===
Waverley Eastern Villages
Party	Candidate	Votes	%	±%
Conservative	Victoria Young*	2,519	68	+9
Liberal Democrats	Fabian Cole	755	20	+9
Labour	Lewis Curtis	246	7	−2
UKIP	Woodruff Walker	177	5	−17
Majority		1764	48	+11
Turnout		3697	37	+5
Conservative hold		Swing		

=== Waverley Western Villages ===
Waverley Western Villages
Party	Candidate	Votes	%	±%
Conservative	David Harmer*	2,345	71	+10
Liberal Democrats	Geoffrey Whitby	585	18	+8
Green	Susan Ryland	361	11	n/a
Majority		1760	53	+14
Turnout		3291	35	+3
Conservative hold		Swing		

At the previous election the UKIP candidate polled 22% and the Labour candidate polled 7%.

=== West Ewell ===
West Ewell
Party	Candidate	Votes	%	±%
Residents	Jan Mason*	1,592	51	+2
Conservative	Stephen Pontin	729	23	+8
Labour	Rob Geleit	462	15	+2
Liberal Democrats	Julia Kirkland	270	9	+4
Green	David Kidd	97	3	n/a
Majority		863	28	−3
Turnout		3150	27	+3
Residents hold		Swing		

At the previous election the UKIP candidate polled 18%.

=== West Molesey ===
West Molesey
Party	Candidate	Votes	%	±%
Residents	Ernest Mallett*	1,763	49	−22
Conservative	Steve Bax	1201	34	+24
Labour	Jamal Ajjane	264	7	+5
Liberal Democrats	Alastair Sturgis	194	5	+2
Green	Sarah Spencer-Bowdage	142	4	n/a
Majority		562	15	−43
Turnout		3564	35	+7.84
Residents hold		Swing		

At the previous election the UKIP candidate polled 13%

=== Weybridge ===
Weybridge
Party	Candidate	Votes	%	±%
Conservative	Tim Oliver	2,069	50	+18
Liberal Democrats	Vicki Macleod	1492	36	+15
Labour	Stephanie Franklin	222	5	
UKIP	Timothy Pope	180	4	+13
Green	Lesley Tilling	156	4	n/a
Majority		577	14	+7
Turnout		4119	36	+8.05
Conservative hold		Swing		

=== Woking North ===
Woking North
Party	Candidate	Votes	%	±%
Conservative	Ben Carasco*	1,913	44	+8
Labour	Mohammad Khan	1666	39	+7
Liberal Democrats	Henry Kay	535	12	−5
UKIP	Judith Squire	193	4	−10
Majority		247	5	+1
Turnout		4307	41	+4
Conservative hold		Swing		

=== Woking South ===
Woking South
Party	Candidate	Votes	%	±%
Liberal Democrats	Will Forster*	2,271	54	+11
Conservative	Paul Saper	1423	34	+5
Labour	Christopher Martin	343	8	0
UKIP	Richard Squire	193	5	−12
Majority		848	20	+6
Turnout		4230	38	+7
Liberal Democrats hold		Swing		

=== Woking South East ===
Woking South East
Party	Candidate	Votes	%	±%
Conservative	Liz Bowes*	2,341	62	+4
Liberal Democrats	Liam Lyons	954	25	+12
Labour	Geoff O'Shea	299	8	−2
UKIP	Robin Milner	174	5	−14
Majority		1387	37	−2
Turnout		3768	38	+6.5
Conservative hold		Swing		

=== Woking South West ===
Woking South West
Party	Candidate	Votes	%	±%
Conservative	Ayesha Azad	1,873	55	+7
Liberal Democrats	Chris Took	940	28	+8
Labour	William James Sellers	391	11	0
UKIP	Terry Knight	200	6	−15
Majority		933	27	0
Turnout		3404	36	+7
Conservative hold		Swing		

=== Woodham and New Haw ===
Woodham and New Haw
Party	Candidate	Votes	%	±%
Conservative	Mary Angell*	2,015	63	+15.7
Liberal Democrats	Jennifer Coulon	372	12	+3
Labour	Philip Martin	330	10	−3
UKIP	Valerie Woodhouse	288	9	−21.9
Green	Martin Robson	193	6	n/a
Majority		1643	51	+35
Turnout		3198	32	+4
Conservative hold		Swing		

=== Worplesdon ===
Worplesdon
Party	Candidate	Votes	%	±%
Conservative	Keith Witham*	2,691	69	+18
Liberal Democrats	Paul Hienkens	658	17	0
Labour	Dominic Stone	359	9	0
Green	Eugene Suggett	182	5	n/a
Majority		2033	52	+23
Turnout		3890	36	+4
Conservative hold		Swing		

At the previous election the UKIP candidate polled 22%.
