= Sarah Finch =

Sarah Finch may refer to:

- Sarah Finch (Doctors)
- Sarah Finch (climate activist)
