= 2013 United Kingdom local elections =

- 2 May 2013

All 27 county councils, 7 out of 55 unitary authorities, 1 out of 22 Welsh principal councils, 1 sui generis authority, and 2 directly elected mayors

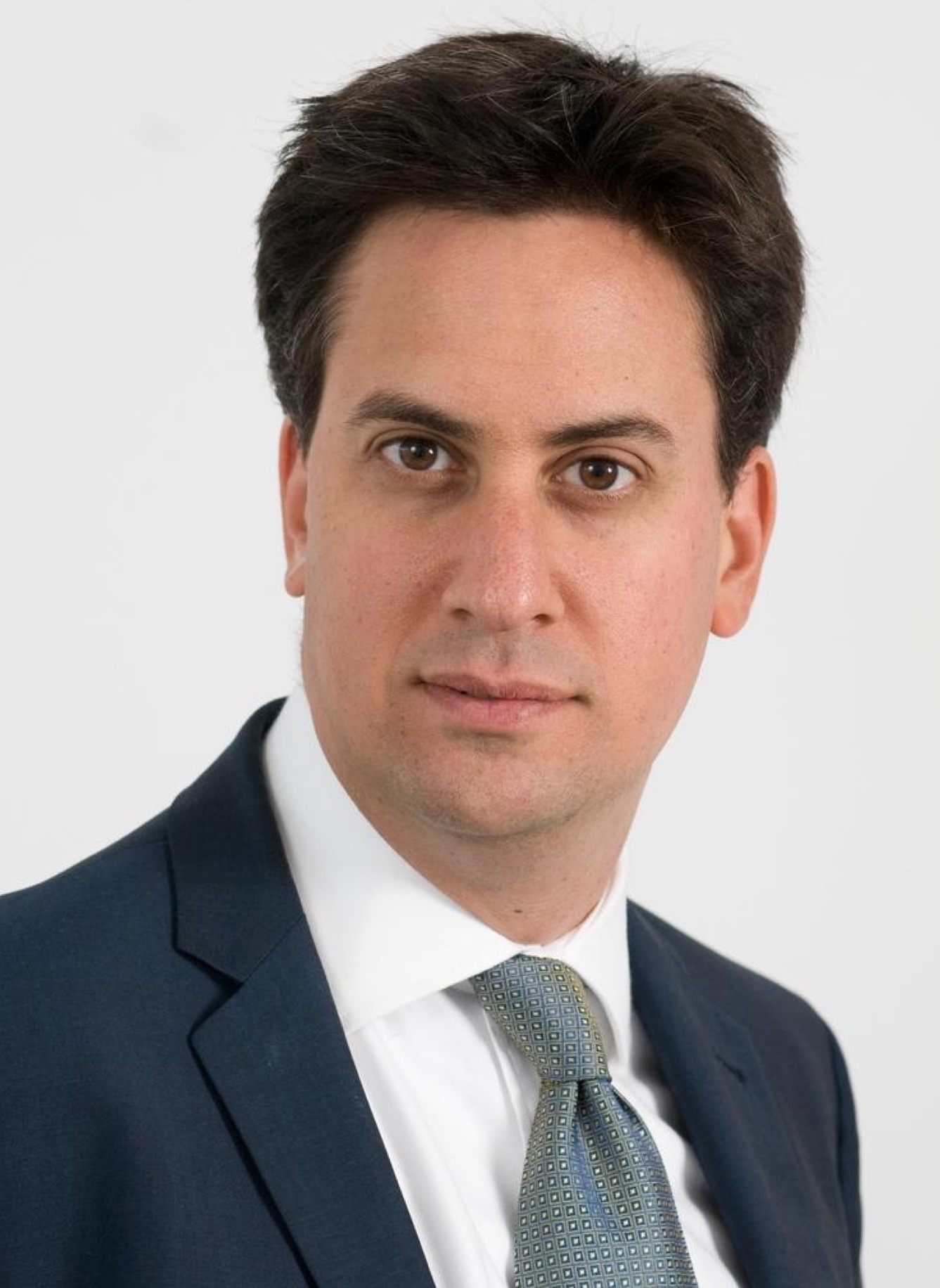

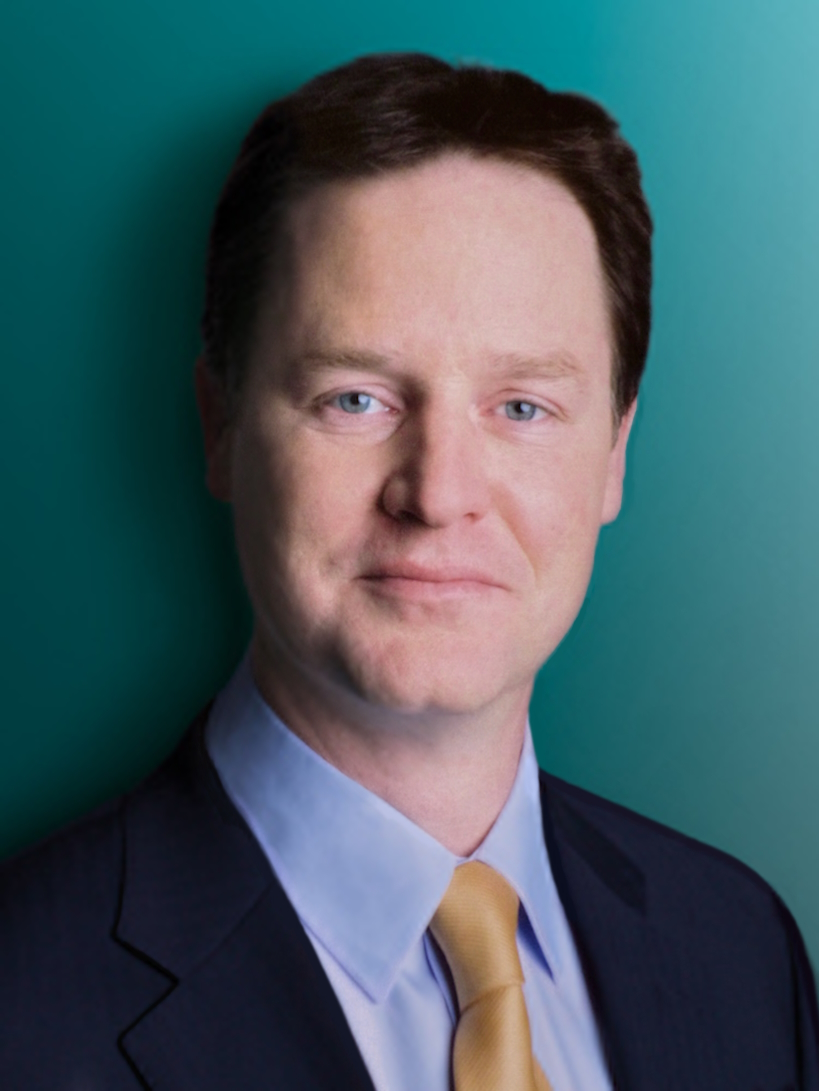

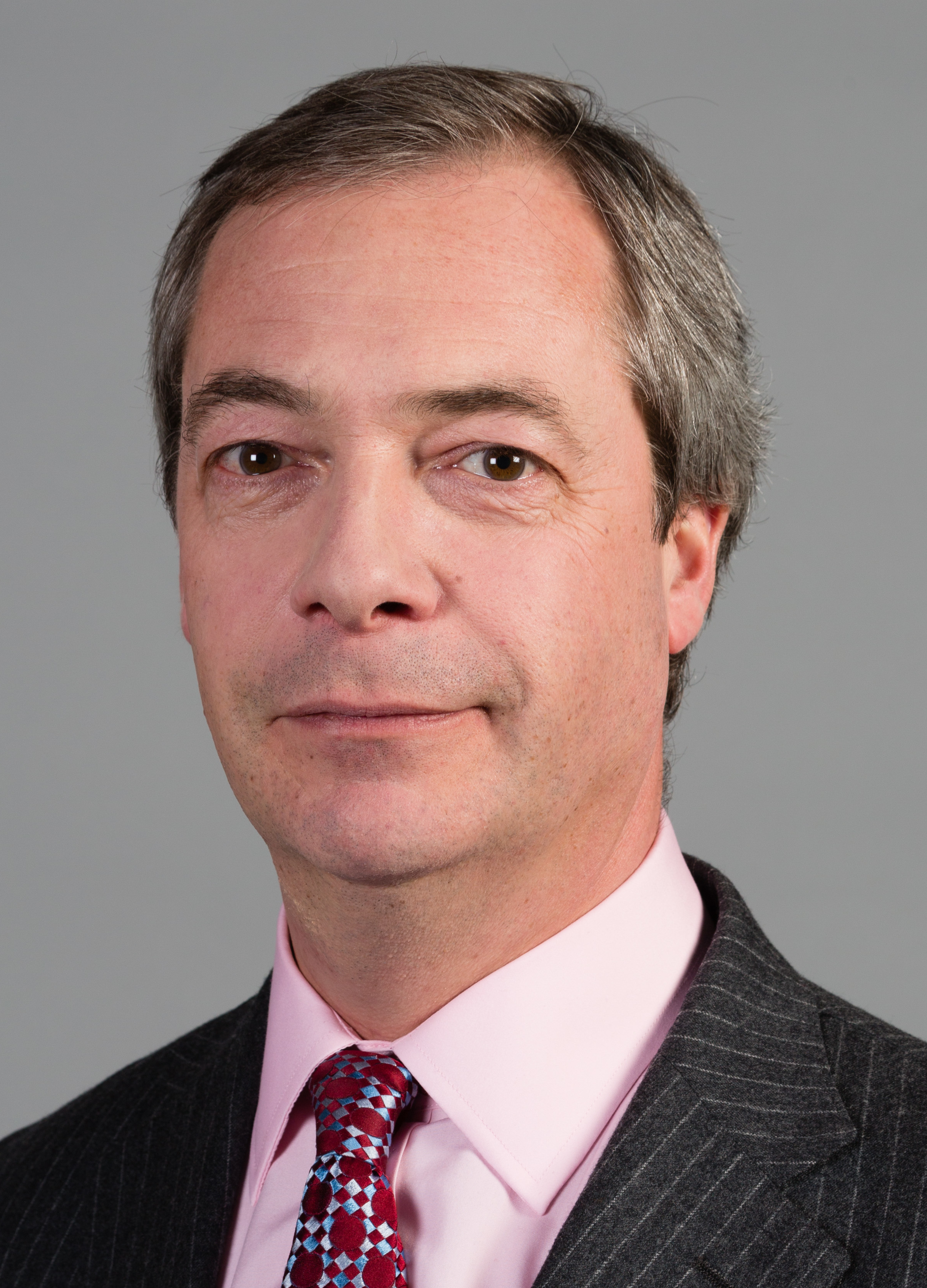
	First party	Second party
Leader	David Cameron	Ed Miliband
Party	Conservative	Labour
Leader since	6 December 2005	25 September 2010
Swing	▼6%	▼9%
Projected vote-share	25% (Note: All vote shares in the infobox are projected national vote shares calculated by the BBC.)	29%
Councils	18	3
Councils +/–	▼10	▲2
Councillors	1,136	538
Councillors +/–	▼335	▲291
	Third party	Fourth party
Leader	Nick Clegg	Nigel Farage
Party	Liberal Democrats	UKIP
Leader since	18 December 2007	5 November 2010
Swing	▼2%	Not given
Projected vote-share	14%	22%
Councils	0	0
Councils +/–	Steady	Steady
Councillors	352	147
Councillors +/–	▼124	▲139
- Map showing council control (left) and largest party by ward or division (right) following the election. Conservative Labour Liberal Democrats UKIP Green Party Plaid Cymru Independent No overall control No election

The 2013 United Kingdom local elections took place on Thursday 2 May 2013. Elections were held in 35 English councils: all 27 non-metropolitan county councils and eight unitary authorities, and in one Welsh unitary authority. Direct mayoral elections took place in Doncaster and North Tyneside. These elections last took place on the 4 June 2009 at the same time as the 2009 European Parliament Elections, except for County Durham, Northumberland and the Anglesey where elections last took place in 2008.

The BBC's projected national vote share (PNV) put Labour on 29%, the Conservatives on 25%, UKIP on 23% and the Liberal Democrats on 14%. Elections analysts Rallings and Thrasher estimated 29% for Labour, 26% for the Conservatives, 22% for UKIP and 13% for the Liberal Democrats.

On the same day a parliamentary by-election took place in the North East constituency of South Shields following the departure of David Miliband, with the Labour Party retaining the seat.

== Criteria to vote ==
All registered electors (British, Irish, Commonwealth and European Union citizens) aged 18 or over were entitled to vote in the local elections. Those temporarily away from their ordinary address (for example, away working, on holiday, in student accommodation or in hospital) were also entitled to vote in the local elections, as were those who had moved abroad and registered as overseas electors.

== Record choice ==
The UK Independence Party and the Green Party stood record numbers of candidates.

== Results ==
Party	Councils		Councillors	
Party	Number	Change	Number	Change
Conservative	18	▼10	1,116	▼335
Labour	3	▲3	538	▲291
Liberal Democrats	0	Steady	352	▼124
UKIP	0	Steady	147	▲139
Green	0	Steady	22	▲5
Plaid Cymru	0	Steady	12	▲6
Residents	0	Steady	12	▲2
Mebyon Kernow	0	Steady	4	▲1
Liberal	0	Steady	3	▲1
Health Concern	0	Steady	2	Steady
BNP	0	Steady	0	▼3
Independent/Other	0	Steady	166	▲24
No overall control	14	▲9	—	—

Labour and UKIP made substantial gains, but the Conservatives won the most councillors and retained control of most councils. The BBC published projected national vote shares, adjusting for which regions are holding local elections and extrapolating to the national situation. These were Labour 29%, Conservatives 25%, UKIP 23% and the Liberal Democrats 14%. This is the lowest figure for the Conservatives since 1982 and the lowest ever figure for the Liberal Democrats. It is also the first time that none of the three main parties in the Commons has scored 30% or more. Rallings & Thrasher separately calculated a projected national vote share of Labour 29%, Conservatives 26%, UKIP 22% and the Liberal Democrats 13%.

The actual votes received were Conservative 34.3%, Labour 21.1%, UKIP 19.9%, Lib Dem 13.8% and Green 3.5%.

Overall, in England, the Conservatives saw 1116 councillors elected (down 335), Labour 538 (up 291), the Liberal Democrats 352 (down 124), independents 165 (up 24), UKIP 147 (up 139), the Greens 22 (up 5), Residents Associations 12 (up 2), Mebyon Kernow 4 (up 1), the Liberal Party 3 (up 1) and Independent Community and Health Concern 2 (no change). The BNP won no seats (down 3).

This was UKIP's highest ever result in a local election.

== England ==
=== Non-metropolitan county councils ===
Map of the results by council (left) and ward (right).

All 27 county councils for areas with a two-tier structure of local governance had all of their seats up for election. These were first-past-the-post elections in a mixture of single-member and multi-member electoral divisions.

Council	Previous control	Result	Details
Buckinghamshire	Conservative	Conservative	Details
Cambridgeshire	Conservative	No overall control (Conservative Minority)	Details
Cumbria	No overall control	No overall control (Labour/Lib Dem Coalition)	Details
Derbyshire	Conservative†	Labour	Details
Devon	Conservative	Conservative	Details
Dorset	Conservative	Conservative	Details
East Sussex	Conservative	No overall control (Conservative Minority)	Details
Essex	Conservative	Conservative	Details
Gloucestershire	Conservative	No overall control (Conservative Minority)	Details
Hampshire	Conservative	Conservative	Details
Hertfordshire	Conservative	Conservative	Details
Kent	Conservative	Conservative	Details
Lancashire	Conservative	No overall control (Labour Minority w/ Lib Dem Support)	Details
Leicestershire	Conservative	Conservative	Details
Lincolnshire	Conservative	No overall control (Conservative/Lib Dem Coalition)	Details
Norfolk	Conservative	No overall control (Labour/UKIP/LibDem Minority w/Green & Ind Support)	Details
North Yorkshire	Conservative	Conservative	Details
Northamptonshire	Conservative	Conservative	Details
Nottinghamshire	Conservative	Labour	Details
Oxfordshire	Conservative	No overall control (Conservative Minority)	Details
Somerset	Conservative	Conservative	Details
Staffordshire	Conservative	Conservative	Details
Suffolk	Conservative	Conservative	Details
Surrey	Conservative	Conservative	Details
Warwickshire	Conservative	No overall control (Conservative Minority)	Details
West Sussex	Conservative	Conservative	Details
Worcestershire	Conservative	Conservative	Details

†The Conservatives won control of the council in the 2009 elections but lost their majority during its term.

=== Unitary authorities ===
Seven single-tier unitary authorities held elections. Seven of these had all of their seats up for election, whilst one, Bristol, elected a third of its seats. These are first-past-the-post elections in a mixture of single-member and multi-member wards.

Council	Proportion up for election	Previous control	Result	Details
Bristol	1/3	No overall control	No overall control	Details
Cornwall	All	No overall control	No overall control (Lib Dem/Independent Coalition)	Details
Durham	All	Labour	Labour	Details
Isle of Wight	All	Conservative	No overall control (Island Independents Minority)	Details
Northumberland	All	No overall control	No overall control (Labour Minority)	Details
Shropshire	All	Conservative	Conservative	Details
Wiltshire	All	Conservative	Conservative	Details

=== Isles of Scilly ===
The Council of the Isles of Scilly was created by the Local Government Act 1888, meaning they lie outside the classifications of authorities used in the rest of England.

Council	Proportion up for election	Previous control	Result	Details
Isles of Scilly	All	Independent	Independent hold	Details

=== Mayoral elections ===
Two elections for directly elected mayors were held, who act as council leader. These are elected using the Supplementary Vote system. Hartlepool's referendum in November 2012 resulted in the post being abolished from May 2013.

Local Authority	Incumbent Mayor	Result	Details
Doncaster	Peter Davies (Independent)	Ros Jones (Labour)	Details
North Tyneside	Linda Arkley (Conservative)	Norma Redfearn (Labour)	Details

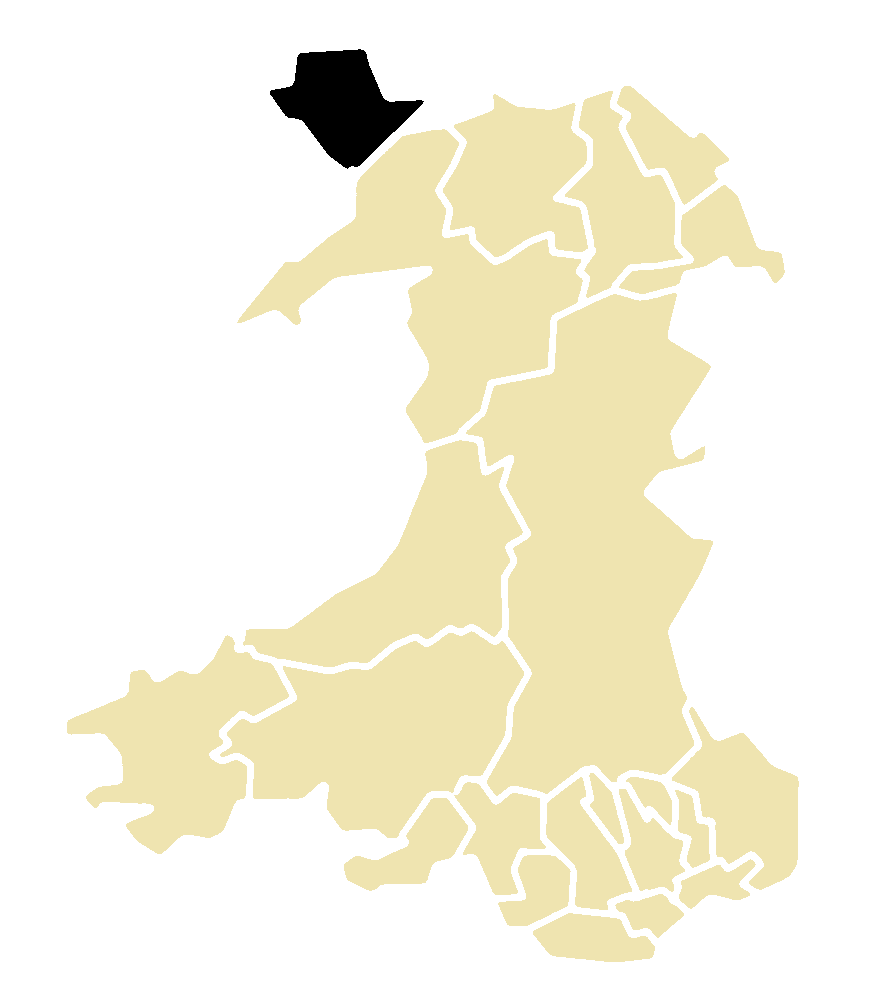
Map showing the results of the elections in Wales Key: No Overall Control No election held

== Wales ==
In Wales, a single council, the Isle of Anglesey, was up for election. This election was postponed in 2012, when all other Welsh councils were elected, in order to allow an electoral review to take place for the council.

Council	Previous control	Result	Details
Isle of Anglesey	No overall control	No overall control	Details

== Elections not scheduled to be held in 2013 (other than by-elections) ==
- The 32 London borough councils (next election 2014)
- The 36 metropolitan district councils (next election 2014)
- The 201 district councils in two-tier authorities (next election 2014 in the 67 councils where members are elected by thirds, and 2015 in the 127 councils where all members are elected together)
- 48 unitary authorities of England (next election 2014 in the 19 councils where members are elected by thirds, excluding Bristol, and 2015 in the 30 councils where all members are elected together)
- The Scottish local councils
- Local councils in Northern Ireland
- The Welsh local councils (except Anglesey)

== See also ==
- 2013 City of London Corporation election
- Political make-up of local councils in the United Kingdom
- 2013 South Shields by-election
- 2012 United Kingdom local elections
- 2009 United Kingdom local elections (the last time most of these elections were held)
