= 2013 Durham County Council election =

UK local government election

← 2008	2 May 2013	2017 →

All 126 council division seats 64 seats needed for a majority

	First party	Second party	Third party
Party	Labour	Independent	Liberal Democrats
Last election	67 seats, 36.4%	12 seats, 15.0%	27 seats, 21.8%
Seats won	94	9	9
Seat change	▲27	▼3	▼18
Popular vote	56,787	16,808	11,772
Percentage	46.0%	13.6%	9.5%
Swing	▲9.6%	▼1.4%	▼12.3%
	Fourth party	Fifth party
Party	Derwentside Independents	Conservative
Last election	10 seats, 6.5%	10 seats, 14.9%
Seats won	8	4
Seat change	▼2	▼6
Popular vote	7,911	10,752
Percentage	6.4%	8.7%
Swing	▼0.1%	▼6.2%
- Map showing the results of the 2013 Durham County Council election. Results by electoral division. Key: Conservative Labour Liberal Democrat Independent Local independent groups Striped divisions have mixed representation.
Council control before election
Labour
Council control after election
Labour

An election to Durham County Council took place on 2 May 2013 as part of the 2013 United Kingdom local elections. Following a boundary review, 126 councillors were elected from 63 electoral divisions which returned either one, two or three councillors each by first-past-the-post voting for a four-year term of office. The previous election took place in 2008 in advance of the council becoming a unitary authority after the 2009 changes to local government. The election saw the Labour Party increase their majority on the council.

All locally registered electors (British, Commonwealth and European Union citizens) who were aged 18 or over on Thursday 2 May 2013 were entitled to vote in the local elections. Those who were temporarily away from their ordinary address (for example, away working, on holiday, in student accommodation or in hospital) were also entitled to vote in the local elections, although those who had moved abroad and registered as overseas electors cannot vote in the local elections. It is possible to register to vote at more than one address (such as a university student who had a term-time address and lives at home during holidays) at the discretion of the local Electoral Register Office, but it remains an offence to vote more than once in the same local government election.

== Summary ==
The Statement of Persons Nominated was published on 8 April 2013. In total 362 candidates stood in the election. The Labour Party had the most candidates, with 125 standing out of a possible 126 and only one candidate standing in the two member Weardale electoral division. The Conservative Party stood 59 candidates, the Liberal Democrats 40, the UK Independence Party 31 and the Green Party 15 candidates. A number of local independent groups stood, including 16 Derwentside Independents and 11 Wear Valley Independents. Nine candidates stood for the Free Association for Independent Representation (FAIR) around Peterlee and Ferryhill, and four for the Spennymoor Independents in Spennymoor and Tudhoe. There were 50 other independent candidates, including two candidates with no description. The British National Party stood two candidates, having fielded 30 in the previous election.

The Labour Party gained 27 seats, increasing their majority on the council to 62. The Liberal Democrats lost 18 seats compared to the 2008 results, with their representation on the new council limited to the city of Durham and the division of Consett North. The Conservative Party lost six seats, winning only in the two Barnard Castle divisions.

Turnout across the county was 27.8%, having fallen from 36.4% in the 2008 elections.

== Results summary ==
Durham County Council election, 2013
Party	Seats	Gains	Losses	Net gain/loss	Seats %	Votes %	Votes	+/−
Labour	94	−	−	+27	74.6	46.0	56,787	+9.6
Independent	9	−	−	−3	7.1	11.8	16,808	−1.4
Liberal Democrats	9	−	−	−18	7.1	9.5	11,772	−12.3
Conservative	4	−	−	−6	3.2	8.7	10,752	−6.2
UKIP	0	−	−	0	0.0	6.9	8,467	+6.8
Derwentside Independents	8	−	−	−2	6.3	6.4	7,911	−0.1
Wear Valley Independent Group	1	−	−	+1	0.8	3.1	3,876	+3.1
Green	0	−	−	0	0.0	1.8	2,217	+1.7
FAIR and Independent	0	−	−	0	0.0	1.5	1,815	+1.5
Spennymoor Independents	1	−	−	+1	0.8	1.2	1,483	+1.2
Ferryhill Association	0	−	−	0	0.0	0.7	866	+0.7
BNP	0	−	−	0	0.0	0.6	681	−3.1

== Results by electoral division ==
=== A − B ===
Annfield Plain (2 seats)
Party	Candidate	Votes	%
Labour	Michele Hodgson	959	53.0
Labour	Thomas J Nearney	799	44.2
Derwentside Independents	Joan Nicholson	757	41.9
Derwentside Independents	David Walker	433	23.9
UKIP	Ken Rollings	402	22.2
Turnout			29.8
Labour win			
Labour win			

Aycliffe East (2 seats)
Party	Candidate	Votes	%
Labour	Sarah Jane Iveson	885	52.6
Labour	Jed Hillary	732	43.5
Independent	Bill Blenkinsopp	598	35.5
Independent	Paul Steven Gittins	456	27.1
Independent	Lileen Cuthbertson	233	13.8
Conservative	Raymond Goodson	119	7.1
Turnout			25.8
Labour win			
Labour win			

Aycliffe North and Middridge (3 seats)
Party	Candidate	Votes	%
Labour	Joan Gray	988	55.5
Labour	John D Clare	985	55.4
Labour	Mike Dixon	884	49.7
Independent	Sandra Haigh	660	37.1
Conservative	Marney Jane Swan	461	25.9
Turnout			21.3
Labour win			
Labour win			
Labour win			

Aycliffe West (2 seats)
Party	Candidate	Votes	%
Labour	Kate Hopper	761	54.6
Labour	Eddy Adam	697	50.0
Independent	George Gray	445	31.9
Independent	Dorothy Bowman	274	19.7
Independent	Brian Haigh	185	13.3
Independent	June Croft	104	7.5
Independent	Sally Annmarie Symons	103	7.4
Conservative	Fane Robert Conant Murray	94	6.7
Turnout			23.1
Labour win			
Labour win			

Barnard Castle East (2 seats)
Party	Candidate	Votes	%
Conservative	James Michael Rowlandson	991	52.7
Conservative	George Richardson	771	41.0
Labour	Thomas Robert Caygill	566	30.1
Labour	Graham David Young	562	29.9
UKIP	David Albert Cyril Royle	481	25.6
Turnout			27.6
Conservative win			
Conservative win			

Barnard Castle West (2 seats)
Party	Candidate	Votes	%
Conservative	Richard Andrew Bell	1,395	66.6
Conservative	Barbara Harrison	1,191	56.8
Green	Thom Robinson	481	22.9
Labour	Phil Hunt	472	22.5
Labour	Matthew Burdess	321	15.3
Turnout			31.4
Conservative win			
Conservative win			

Belmont (3 seats)
Party	Candidate	Votes	%
Labour Co-op	Katie Corrigan	1,490	40.7
Labour Co-op	Patrick Conway	1,488	40.6
Labour Co-op	Bill Moir	1,300	35.5
Liberal Democrats	Eric Stuart Mavin	1,146	31.3
Liberal Democrats	Dennis Southwell	1,004	27.4
Liberal Democrats	Christopher Pattinson	966	26.4
Independent	Arthur Walker	707	19.3
Independent	Chris Gill	645	17.6
Green	Thomas Victor Kaye	272	7.4
Conservative	Marc Alexander Krajewski	267	7.3
Conservative	Paul Jackson	237	6.5
Green	William Jennings Pinkney-Baird	222	6.1
Turnout			34.3
Labour Co-op win			
Labour Co-op win			
Labour Co-op win			

Benfieldside (2 seats)
Party	Candidate	Votes	%
Derwentside Independents	Stephen Robinson	1,090	53.6
Derwentside Independents	Peter Oliver	915	45.0
Labour	John Davies	761	37.4
Labour	Brynnen Elizabeth Ririe	625	30.7
Liberal Democrats	Keith English	274	13.5
Liberal Democrats	James Settrey	167	8.2
Turnout			32.0
Derwentside Independents win			
Derwentside Independents win			

Bishop Auckland Town (2 seats)
Party	Candidate	Votes	%
Wear Valley Independent Group	Sam Zair	861	52.1
Labour	Joy Allen	615	37.2
Labour	Dave Hunter	552	33.4
Conservative	John Gasston	442	26.7
Liberal Democrats	Alan Anderson	406	24.6
Turnout			26.5
Wear Valley Independent Group win			
Labour win			

Bishop Middleham and Cornforth (1 seat)
Party	Candidate	Votes	%
Labour	Mick Simpson	592	82.3
Conservative	Judith May Webb	127	17.7
Turnout			23.4
Labour win			

Blackhalls (2 seats)
Party	Candidate	Votes	%
Labour	Rob Crute	1,151	60.9
Labour	Lynn Pounder	1,046	55.4
Independent	Alan Cox	869	46.0
Turnout			28.3
Labour win			
Labour win			

Brandon (2 seats)
Party	Candidate	Votes	%
Labour	John Turnbull	1,396	74.7
Labour	Paul Taylor	1,384	74.1
Liberal Democrats	Maureen Smith	403	21.6
Conservative	Jak Hocking	229	12.3
Turnout			25.2
Labour win			
Labour win			

Burnopfield and Dipton (2 seats)
Party	Candidate	Votes	%
Derwentside Independents	Bob Alderson	760	39.5
Labour	Ivan Jewell	701	36.5
Labour	Joanne Carr	688	35.6
Derwentside Independents	David Marrs	510	26.5
Independent	Reg Ord	381	19.8
Independent	Roland Hemsley	328	17.1
Independent	Trevor Ord	257	13.4
Turnout			30.4
Derwentside Independents win			
Labour win			

=== C − D ===
Chester-le-Street East (1 seat)
Party	Candidate	Votes	%
Labour	Lawson Armstrong	310	32.2
Conservative	Beaty Bainbridge	285	29.6
UKIP	Graham Roy Thorp	229	23.8
Independent	Maureen Diana May	140	14.5
Turnout			30.8
Labour win			

Chester-le-Street North (1 seat)
Party	Candidate	Votes	%
Labour	Tracie Jane Smith	853	75.9
Conservative	Philip Hall	148	13.0
UKIP	Lesley Cook	137	12.0
Turnout			35.4
Labour win			

Chester-le-Street South (2 seats)
Party	Candidate	Votes	%
Labour Co-op	Keith Davidson	1,047	51.1
Labour Co-op	Katherine Helen Henig	926	45.2
Conservative	Allan Bainbridge	528	25.8
UKIP	Fiona Ford	410	20.0
Conservative	Daniel Mayne	379	18.5
UKIP	Miles Ford	377	18.4
Liberal Democrats	Philip Bernard Nathan	181	8.8
Liberal Democrats	Michael Keith Peacock	114	5.6
Turnout			33.1
Labour Co-op win			
Labour Co-op win			

Chester-le-Street West Central (2 seats)
Party	Candidate	Votes	%
Labour	Simon Antony Henig	1,171	70.5
Labour	Linda Marshall	1,126	67.8
UKIP	Kenneth W Taylor	335	20.2
UKIP	Samantha Robinson	265	16.0
Conservative	Mark Thomas Nicholson	137	8.2
Conservative	Julie Ann Watson	116	7.0
Turnout			27.2
Labour win			
Labour win			

Chilton (1 seat)
Party	Candidate	Votes	%
Labour	Christine Potts	646	65.5
Independent	Peter Davies	280	28.4
Conservative	Richard Child	61	6.2
Turnout			31.7
Labour win			

Consett North (2 seats)
Party	Candidate	Votes	%
Liberal Democrats	Owen Temple	924	43.8
Independent	Alex Watson	765	36.2
Labour	Clive Robson	574	27.2
Labour	Sara-Jane Heslop	499	23.6
Liberal Democrats	Margaret Nealis	491	23.2
Derwentside Independents	Mary Westgarth	408	19.3
UKIP	Shaun Bailey	253	12.0
Turnout			33.7
Liberal Democrats win			
Independent win			

Consett South (1 seat)
Party	Candidate	Votes	%
Derwentside Independents	Derek Hicks	306	53.6
Labour	Malcolm Andrew Clarke	265	46.4
Turnout			19.8
Derwentside Independents win			

Coundon (1 seat)
Party	Candidate	Votes	%
Labour	Charlie Kay	396	60.6
Wear Valley Independent Group	Lesley Zair	217	33.2
Conservative	Michael John Gossage	41	6.3
Turnout			20.2
Labour win			

Coxhoe (3 seats)
Party	Candidate	Votes	%
Labour	Mac Williams	1,826	72.5
Labour	Maria Leina Plews	1,737	68.9
Labour	Jan Blakey	1,536	61.0
Conservative	Miranda Jupp	264	10.5
Liberal Democrats	John Lightley	264	10.5
Conservative	Edward Parson	244	9.7
Conservative	Benjamin Tomos Lewis	241	9.6
Liberal Democrats	Stuart Walton	209	8.3
Liberal Democrats	Adam Walker	169	6.7
Turnout			26.6
Labour win			
Labour win			
Labour win			

Craghead and South Moor (2 seats)
Party	Candidate	Votes	%
Labour	Mark Davinson	995	63.2
Labour	Carole Hampson	939	59.7
Derwentside Independents	Jim Lockie	488	31.0
UKIP	Andrew McDonald	319	20.3
Turnout			26.3
Labour win			
Labour win			

Crook (3 seats)
Party	Candidate	Votes	%
Independent	Eddie Murphy	771	34.1
Labour	Eddie Tomlinson	719	31.8
Labour	Geoff Mowbray	691	30.6
Labour	Lindsay Wright	642	28.4
Independent	Ian Hirst	630	27.9
Independent	John Winter	594	26.3
Wear Valley Independent Group	John Bailey	559	24.7
Wear Valley Independent Group	Patricia Jopling	476	21.1
Wear Valley Independent Group	Aaron Cowen	450	19.9
Liberal Democrats	David English	161	7.1
Liberal Democrats	David Gordon Halliday	144	6.4
Liberal Democrats	Ken Godard	124	5.5
Green	Jo Yelland	123	5.4
Green	Katherine Ruth Margrave Machen	89	3.9
Green	Gerald Alken	88	3.9
Turnout			23.8
Independent win			
Labour win			
Labour win			

Dawdon (2 seats)
Party	Candidate	Votes	%
Labour	Kevin Joseph Shaw	1,115	61.0
Labour	Sonia Forster	993	54.4
Independent	Robert Arthur	829	45.4
Turnout			26.6
Labour win			
Labour win			

Deerness (3 seats)
Party	Candidate	Votes	%
Labour	Jean Kathleen Chaplow	1,753	59.8
Labour	David Bell	1,616	55.2
Labour	Anne Bonner	1,475	50.3
Liberal Democrats	John Wilkinson	632	21.6
Independent	Rev Crooks	539	18.4
Independent	Annette Crooks	424	14.5
Independent	Shaun Easter	404	13.8
Liberal Democrats	John Joseph Kelley	359	12.3
Liberal Democrats	Andrea Watts	357	12.2
Conservative	Andrew Lloyd	155	5.3
Conservative	Benjamin Frost	151	5.2
Conservative	Theo Lloyd	125	4.3
Turnout			
Labour win			
Labour win			
Labour win			

Delves Lane (2 seats)
Party	Candidate	Votes	%
Labour	Jane Brown	1,066	70.3
Labour	Bob Glass	776	51.3
Derwentside Independents	Lesley Anne Richardson	581	38.4
Turnout			23.9
Labour win			
Labour win			

Deneside (2 seats)
Party	Candidate	Votes	%
Labour	Edward Bell	972	81.1
Labour	Jennifer Ann Bell	920	76.8
Independent	Steven Paul Colborn	263	22.0
Turnout			20.6
Labour win			
Labour win			

Durham South (1 seat)
Party	Candidate	Votes	%
Liberal Democrats	David Stoker	349	43.3
Labour	Andrzej Olechnowicz	250	31.0
Conservative	Jonathan Alan Duell	117	14.5
Green	Robert Edward Shaw	90	11.2
Turnout			27.9
Liberal Democrats win			

=== E − N ===
Easington (2 seats)
Party	Candidate	Votes	%
Labour	David John Boyes	1,026	67.8
Labour	Angela Surtees	936	61.8
Independent	Terry Murray	521	34.4
Green	Martie Warin	244	16.1
Turnout			25.4
Labour win			
Labour win			

Elvet and Gilesgate (2 seats)
Party	Candidate	Votes	%
Liberal Democrats	David Robert Freeman	572	39.1
Liberal Democrats	Richard Daniel Ormerod	532	36.4
Labour	Alan Hayton	450	30.8
Labour	Peter James Thompson	413	28.2
Conservative	Rebecca Mary Louise Coulson	193	13.2
Green	Sean Patrick Healy	191	13.1
Green	Jake Adam Pentland	171	11.7
Conservative	Patricia Wynne	160	10.9
UKIP	Christopher John Arthur	151	10.3
Turnout			21.3
Liberal Democrats win			
Liberal Democrats win			

Esh and Witton Gilbert (2 seats)
Party	Candidate	Votes	%
Labour	Joe Armstrong	897	43.6
Labour	Barbara Armstrong	865	42.0
Liberal Democrats	Arnie Simpson	693	33.7
Liberal Democrats	Paul Guy	636	30.9
UKIP	Rita Moralee	410	19.9
UKIP	Susan Bell	390	18.9
Conservative	Megan Alis Roberts	105	5.1
Conservative	Pok Lai Leung	86	4.2
Turnout			32.1
Labour win			
Labour win			

Evenwood (2 seats)
Party	Candidate	Votes	%
Labour	Pauline Mary Charlton	870	52.2
Labour	Andy Turner	655	39.3
Conservative	Stephen Hugill	529	31.7
UKIP	Graham Casey	491	29.5
Conservative	Linda Raper	362	21.7
Turnout			24.9
Labour win			
Labour win			

Ferryhill (3 seats)
Party	Candidate	Votes	%
Labour	Patrick McCourt	968	40.4
Independent	Brian Francis Avery	933	38.9
Labour	Pauline Crathorne	867	36.1
F.A.I.R.	Charlie Rand	866	36.1
F.A.I.R.	David Farry	850	35.4
F.A.I.R.	Mel Brown	833	34.7
Labour	Craig Patterson	784	32.7
Turnout			26.8
Labour win			
Independent win			
Labour win			

Framwellgate and Newton Hall (3 seats)
Party	Candidate	Votes	%
Liberal Democrats	Amanda Jayne Hopgood	1,628	41.9
Liberal Democrats	Mark Ashley Wilkes	1,590	40.9
Liberal Democrats	Mamie Simmons	1,452	37.4
Labour	Laurence Bell	1,179	30.4
Labour	Joe Lennox	1,140	29.4
Labour	Aurelia Constance Smith	1,082	27.9
Independent	Terry Moderate	714	18.4
UKIP	Colin Thomas Mortimer	589	15.2
Independent	Philip Wolstenholme	421	10.8
Independent	Shaun Kennedy	265	6.8
Conservative	Alex Humphries	237	6.1
Green	James Benedict Elliott	174	4.5
Conservative	Anne Murphy	169	4.4
Green	Amanda Jayne Taylor Aiken	147	3.8
Green	Daniel Alexis Wolfe Stern	141	3.6
Turnout			36.7
Liberal Democrats win			
Liberal Democrats win			
Liberal Democrats win			

Horden (2 seats)
Party	Candidate	Votes	%
Labour	Paul Stradling	1,218	72.5
Labour	June Clark	939	55.9
Independent	Doug Langan	442	26.3
Independent	Dennis Maddison	432	25.7
Turnout			26.3
Labour win			
Labour win			

Lanchester (2 seats)
Party	Candidate	Votes	%
Labour	Ossie Johnson	1,189	58.2
Derwentside Independents	Richie Young	876	42.9
Labour	Janet Box	758	37.1
UKIP	John Harpin	413	20.2
UKIP	Clive Taylor-Sholl	340	16.6
Conservative	Christopher James MacAllister	275	13.5
Turnout			
Labour win			
Derwentside Independents win			

Leadgate and Medomsley (2 seats)
Party	Candidate	Votes	%
Derwentside Independents	Watts Stelling	1,413	59.1
Derwentside Independents	Alan Shield	1,147	48.0
Labour	Liam Carr	976	40.8
Labour	Estelle Spring	709	29.6
Conservative	Leanne Moses	206	8.6
Turnout			33.9
Derwentside Independents win			
Derwentside Independents win			

Lumley (2 seats)
Party	Candidate	Votes	%
Independent	Alan Bell	1,083	58.7
Independent	Audrey Willis	889	48.2
Labour	David Thompson	737	39.9
Labour	Rita Carr	656	35.6
Turnout			3.5
Independent win			
Independent win			

Murton (2 seats)
Party	Candidate	Votes	%
Labour	Alan Napier	1,305	75.0
Labour	Joyce Maitland	1,214	69.8
UKIP	Arthur Ord	403	23.2
UKIP	Michael Walton	376	21.6
Turnout			27.8
Labour win			
Labour win			

Neville's Cross (2 seats)
Party	Candidate	Votes	%
Liberal Democrats	Nigel Martin	1,117	45.4
Liberal Democrats	Grenville Holland	1,087	44.2
Green	Jonathan Elmer	642	26.1
Green	Stephen Ashfield	619	25.2
Labour	Jonathan Priestman Lovell	471	19.1
Labour	Jonathan George Alfred Roberts	442	18.0
Conservative	Michael Drummond Moverley Smith	247	10.0
Conservative	Wendy Frances Smith	228	9.3
Turnout			32.1
Liberal Democrats win			
Liberal Democrats win			

North Lodge (1 seat)
Party	Candidate	Votes	%
Independent	Peter Howard May	540	47.5
Labour Co-op	Sarah Gill	288	25.3
Liberal Democrats	Craig Martin	259	22.8
Conservative	Lucille Diana Nicholson	50	4.4
Turnout			39.0
Independent win			

=== P − S ===
Passfield (1 seat)
Party	Candidate	Votes	%
Independent	Joan Maslin	348	36.6
Labour	Mandy Jean Thompson	334	35.1
FAIR & Independent	David Hawley	270	28.4
Turnout			26.1
Independent win			

Pelton (3 seats)
Party	Candidate	Votes	%
Labour	Alison Batey	1,788	67.5
Labour	Jim Cordon	1,660	62.7
Labour	Colin Carr	1,422	53.7
UKIP	Stephen Neil Black	865	32.7
Conservative	Joel Andrew Shepherd	429	16.2
Conservative	Henry Spencer	394	14.9
Turnout			25.7
Labour win			
Labour win			
Labour win			

Peterlee East (2 seats)
Party	Candidate	Votes	%
Labour	Harry Bennett	797	57.9
Labour	Audrey Ellen Laing	728	52.9
FAIR & Independent	John Hardy	518	37.6
FAIR & Independent	Susan Lewins	516	37.5
Turnout			23.4
Labour win			
Labour win			

Peterlee West (2 seats)
Party	Candidate	Votes	%
Labour	James Alvey	669	47.9
Labour	Janice Isabella Measor	542	38.8
FAIR & Independent	Susan McDonnell	534	38.2
FAIR & Independent	Karen Hawley	509	36.4
Independent	Ralph Liddle	325	23.3
Conservative	Mandeep Thandi	36	2.6
Turnout			21.5
Labour win			
Labour win			

Sacriston (2 seats)
Party	Candidate	Votes	%
Labour	Heather Sara Liddle	919	61.1
Labour	Simon Joseph Wilson	911	60.5
UKIP	Bruce Robertson Reid	348	23.1
UKIP	Michael Trevor Toms	330	21.9
Conservative	Mark Anthony Watson	108	7.2
Liberal Democrats	Lynne Michelle Cowan	98	6.5
Conservative	Laurence James Ashwin	97	6.4
Liberal Democrats	Alexander Nichol Woodmass	64	4.3
Turnout			26.0
Labour win			
Labour win			

Seaham (2 seats)
Party	Candidate	Votes	%
Labour	Geraldine Bleasdale	748	51.1
Labour	Sue Morrison	700	47.8
UKIP	Lynn Errington	445	30.4
UKIP	Jeanette Andria Strong	400	27.3
Conservative	Derick Dixon	278	19.0
Conservative	Margaret Reid	209	14.3
Turnout			25.9
Labour win			
Labour win			

Sedgefield (2 seats)
Party	Candidate	Votes	%
Labour	John Robinson	1,166	50.9
Labour	Rachel Lumsdon	939	41.0
Conservative	David Ralph Brown	864	37.7
Conservative	Rebecca Rhiannon Hagan	665	29.0
Independent	Jimmy Seymour	493	21.5
Turnout			35.7
Labour win			
Labour win			

Sherburn (2 seats)
Party	Candidate	Votes	%
Labour	Stephen Guy	1,084	51.7
Labour	David Marshall Hall	1,012	48.3
Liberal Democrats	Carol Ann Woods	710	33.9
Liberal Democrats	Maureen Wood	645	30.8
Independent	Andrew Neil Sowerby	231	11.0
Conservative	Will Halford	213	10.2
Conservative	Michael James Fishwick	143	6.8
Turnout			30.7
Labour win			
Labour win			

Shildon and Dene Valley (3 seats)
Party	Candidate	Votes	%
Labour	Brian Stephens	1,443	51.2
Labour	Henry Nicholson	1,294	45.9
Labour	Trish Pemberton	1,104	39.2
Independent	David Michael Hancock	1,022	36.3
Wear Valley Independent Group	Kenny Beal	793	28.2
Liberal Democrats	James Garry Huntington	737	26.2
Independent	Robert Ingledew	692	24.6
Liberal Democrats	Gareth Michael Robinson Howe	422	15.0
Turnout			27.5
Labour win			
Labour win			
Labour win			

Shotton and South Hetton (2 seats)
Party	Candidate	Votes	%
Labour	Eunice Huntington	893	53.6
Labour	Robin John Todd	871	52.3
Independent	Ivan Cochrane	686	41.2
FAIR & Independent	Karon Liddell	493	29.6
Turnout			24.0
Labour win			
Labour win			

Spennymoor (3 seats)
Party	Candidate	Votes	%
Spennymoor Independents People Before Politics	Kevin Thompson	1,034	43.2
Labour	Ian Geldard	950	39.7
Labour	Pat Lawton	911	38.1
Spennymoor Independents People Before Politics	Elizabeth Maddison	877	36.7
Liberal Democrats	Ben Ord	872	36.5
Labour	Colin Nelson	868	36.3
BNP	Amanda Molloy	271	11.3
Conservative	George Smedley	188	7.9
Turnout			27.6
Spennymoor Independents People Before Politics win			
Labour win			
Labour win			

Stanley (2 seats)
Party	Candidate	Votes	%
Labour	Carl Marshall	1,161	68.6
Labour	Katherine Dearden	1,064	62.9
Derwentside Independents	Jack Pye	455	26.9
UKIP	Alan Robinson	258	15.2
UKIP	Valentine Taylor-Sholl	180	10.6
Turnout			25.1
Labour win			
Labour win			

=== T − W ===
Tanfield (2 seats)
Party	Candidate	Votes	%
Labour	Olga Milburn	914	50.0
Derwentside Independents	Joyce Charlton	777	42.5
Labour	Peter McLaughlin	753	41.2
Derwentside Independents	Tom Pattinson	566	30.9
UKIP	Alan Errington	296	16.2
Turnout			26.7
Derwentside Independents win			
Labour win			

Tow Law (1 seat)
Party	Candidate	Votes	%
Labour	John Hart	399	44.9
Independent	Anita Atkinson	220	24.8
Wear Valley Independent Group	Ron Grogan	148	16.7
Independent	Terry Batson	93	10.5
Independent	Don Nevin Cameron	27	3.0
Turnout			25.2
Labour win			

Trimdon and Thornley (3 seats)
Party	Candidate	Votes	%
Labour	Morris Nicholls	1,801	69.7
Labour	Lucy Hovvels	1,692	65.5
Labour	Peter Brookes	1,654	64.0
UKIP	Jean Rosalind Seath	581	22.5
UKIP	Ted Seath	510	19.7
Turnout			24.9
Labour win			
Labour win			
Labour win			

Tudhoe (2 seats)
Party	Candidate	Votes	%
Labour	Barbara Graham	1,024	50.9
Labour	Neil Crowther Foster	942	46.8
Spennymoor Independents People Before Politics	Richard Parker	449	22.3
BNP	Pete Molloy	410	20.4
UKIP	Cherry Rozanne Hudson	302	15.0
Spennymoor Independents People Before Politics	Christine Sproat	261	13.0
Conservative	Richard Louis Coad	121	6.0
Liberal Democrats	Eddie Rhodes	115	5.7
Turnout			32.0
Labour win			
Labour win			

Weardale (2 seats)
Party	Candidate	Votes	%
Independent	John Shuttleworth	1,642	59.8
Independent	Anita Savory	1,536	56.0
Labour	Joe Kirwin	983	35.8
Conservative	Christine Susan Holt	197	7.2
Conservative	Ivy Wilson	142	5.2
Turnout			41.7
Independent win			
Independent win			

West Auckland (2 seats)
Party	Candidate	Votes	%
Labour	Rob Yorke	772	55.3
Labour	Christine Wilson	682	48.9
Wear Valley Independent Group	George Smith	408	29.2
UKIP	Betty Hopson	349	25.0
Conservative	Alan Booth	204	14.6
Turnout			21.1
Labour win			
Labour win			

Willington and Hunwick (2 seats)
Party	Candidate	Votes	%
Labour	Joe Buckham	908	52.8
Labour	Olwyn Elizabeth Gunn	870	50.6
Wear Valley Independent Group	Matthew Todd	731	42.5
Conservative	Kath Currie	334	19.4
Conservative	Margaret Ann Mukherjee	152	8.9
Turnout			24.9
Labour win			
Labour win			

Wingate (1 seat)
Party	Candidate	Votes	%
Labour	Leo Taylor	538	67.8
Independent	Janet Higgins	256	32.2
Turnout			24.4
Labour win			

Woodhouse Close (2 seats)
Party	Candidate	Votes	%
Labour	John Lethbridge	694	56.4
Labour	June Elizabeth Lee	602	48.9
Independent	Billy Neilson	315	25.6
Liberal Democrats	Betty Todd	231	18.8
Wear Valley Independent Group	Michael O'Neil	159	12.9
Wear Valley Independent Group	Vince Perkins	152	12.4
Conservative	Jack Victor Seear	77	6.3
Turnout			19.3
Labour win			
Labour win			

== By-elections ==
Crook, 7 November 2013
Party	Candidate	Votes	%	±%
Labour	Andrea Patterson	741	40.3	+9.7
Independent	Ian Hirst	496	27.0	−0.9
Wear Valley Independent Group	John Bailey	360	19.6	−5.1
Liberal Democrats	David English	145	7.9	+0.8
Conservative	Beatty Bainbridge	54	2.9	N/A
Green	Joanne Yelland	41	2.2	−3.2
Turnout			18.6	
Labour hold		Swing	N/A	

Crook, 18 September 2014
Party	Candidate	Votes	%	±%
Labour	Maureen Stanton	753	47.0	+18.6
UKIP	Margaret Hopson	339	21.1	N/A
Liberal Democrats	David English	233	14.5	+7.4
Independent	Anthony Simpson	193	12.0	N/A
Conservative	Alan Booth	90	5.6	N/A
Turnout			17.2	
Labour gain from Independent		Swing	N/A	

Burnopfield & Dipton, 23 October 2014
Party	Candidate	Votes	%	±%
Labour	Joanne Carr	656	44.9	+9.3
Derwentside Independents	Gillian Burnett	655	44.8	+5.3
Conservative	Alan Booth	83	5.7	N/A
Green	Melanie Howd	68	4.7	N/A
Turnout			23.4	
Labour gain from Derwentside Independents		Swing	N/A	

Evenwood, 23 October 2014
Party	Candidate	Votes	%	±%
Labour	Heather Broadbent	546	38.2	−14.0
Conservative	Anthony Hugill	396	27.7	−4.0
UKIP	Graham Casey	309	21.6	−7.9
Independent	Lee Carnighan	108	7.5	N/A
Green	Greg Robinson	72	5.0	N/A
Turnout			21.7	
Labour hold		Swing	N/A	

Barnard Castle West, 7 May 2015
Party	Candidate	Votes	%	±%
Conservative	Edward Henderson	2,518	57.6	+0.8
Green	Thomas Robinson	972	22.3	−0.6
Labour	Philip Hunt	878	20.1	−2.4
Turnout			69.6	
Labour hold		Swing	N/A	

Ferryhill, 7 May 2015
Party	Candidate	Votes	%	±%
Labour	John Lindsay	2,266	49.6	+9.2
Independent	Joseph Makepeace	1,989	43.5	N/A
Green	William Lawrence	316	6.9	N/A
Turnout			55.6	
Labour hold		Swing	N/A	

Sherburn, 7 May 2015
Party	Candidate	Votes	%	±%
Labour	William Kellett	2,218	52.3	+0.6
Conservative	Michael Fishwick	985	23.2	+16.4
Liberal Democrats	Andrew Tibbs	531	12.5	−21.4
Green	Joanna Smith	508	12.0	N/A
Turnout			64.5	
Labour hold		Swing	N/A	

Ferryhill, 7 May 2015
Party	Candidate	Votes	%	±%
Labour	Fraser Tinsley	2,169	54.4	+1.6
Independent	Matthew Todd	1,512	38.0	−4.5
Green	Mark Quinn	301	7.6	N/A
Turnout			58.0	
Labour hold		Swing	N/A	

Shotton & South Hetton, 20 August 2015
Party	Candidate	Votes	%	±%
Labour	Alan Liversidge	595	52.5	+0.2
North East	Edward Hall	214	18.9	N/A
UKIP	Lee-James Harris	131	11.6	N/A
Liberal Democrats	Michael Anderson	107	9.4	N/A
Conservative	Beatrice Bainbridge	67	5.9	N/A
Green	Martie Warin	19	1.7	N/A
Turnout			17.8	
Labour hold		Swing	N/A	
