= British High Court =

British High Court may refer to:

- High Court of Justice (England and Wales)
- High Court of Justiciary (Scotland)
- High Court of Justice in Northern Ireland
- High Court of Justice for the trial of Charles I
- High Court of Justice in Ireland
