= Sarah Finch (climate activist) =

English climate activist and Goldman Prize winner

- Born: 1964 (age 61–62); Surrey, England
- Occupations: Climate activist; Writer; Editor
- Organization: Co-founder of the Weald Climate Group
- Political party: Green Party
- Awards: Goldman Environmental Prize 2026

Sarah Finch (born 1964) is a British climate activist, writer, and editor most known for co-founding the Weald Climate Group and fighting to block oil drilling in the Weald. She also served as a Reigate and Banstead Borough Councilor. She was awarded the Goldman Environmental Prize in 2026 for her work fighting against oil drilling in the Weald.

== Biography ==
Finch grew up in Surrey, and became an environmental activist from a young age after hearing news reports about deforestation and acid rain. She worked as a writer and editor, and also served on the Reigate and Banstead Borough Council as a member of the Green Party from 2011 to 2015.

She discovered a proposal to drill at Horse Hill in the Weald from a local newspaper in 2010, and soon joined forces with others to co-founded the Weald Climate Group, which campaigned and successfully got numerous drilling applications refused and withdrawn. However, the drilling continued to expand. Soon, Finch discovered that the plans which were being assessed by the council had mentioned the environmental impact of the drilling but not that of the using of the oil, and after a major expansion was approved, she agreed to lead a court case to block the project.

The case was rejected to be heard at first but was then heard by the British High Court, which ruled against the activists, and then at the Court of Appeal, where Finch also led protests outside the courthouse. After a negative ruling from that court, they appealed to the Supreme Court of the United Kingdom, which sided with the activists, ruling that environmental impact statements of drilling must include the environmental impact of the usage of the materials extracted. This ruling soon resulted in the other courts and the government blocking coal and oil projects, including the oil drilling in the Weald.

Finch was awarded the Goldman Prize for Europe in 2026 for her environmental advocacy. She became a part of the first all-woman cohort of Goldman Prize recipients.
