= David Hodge (Conservative politician) =

English politician

David Hodge CBE
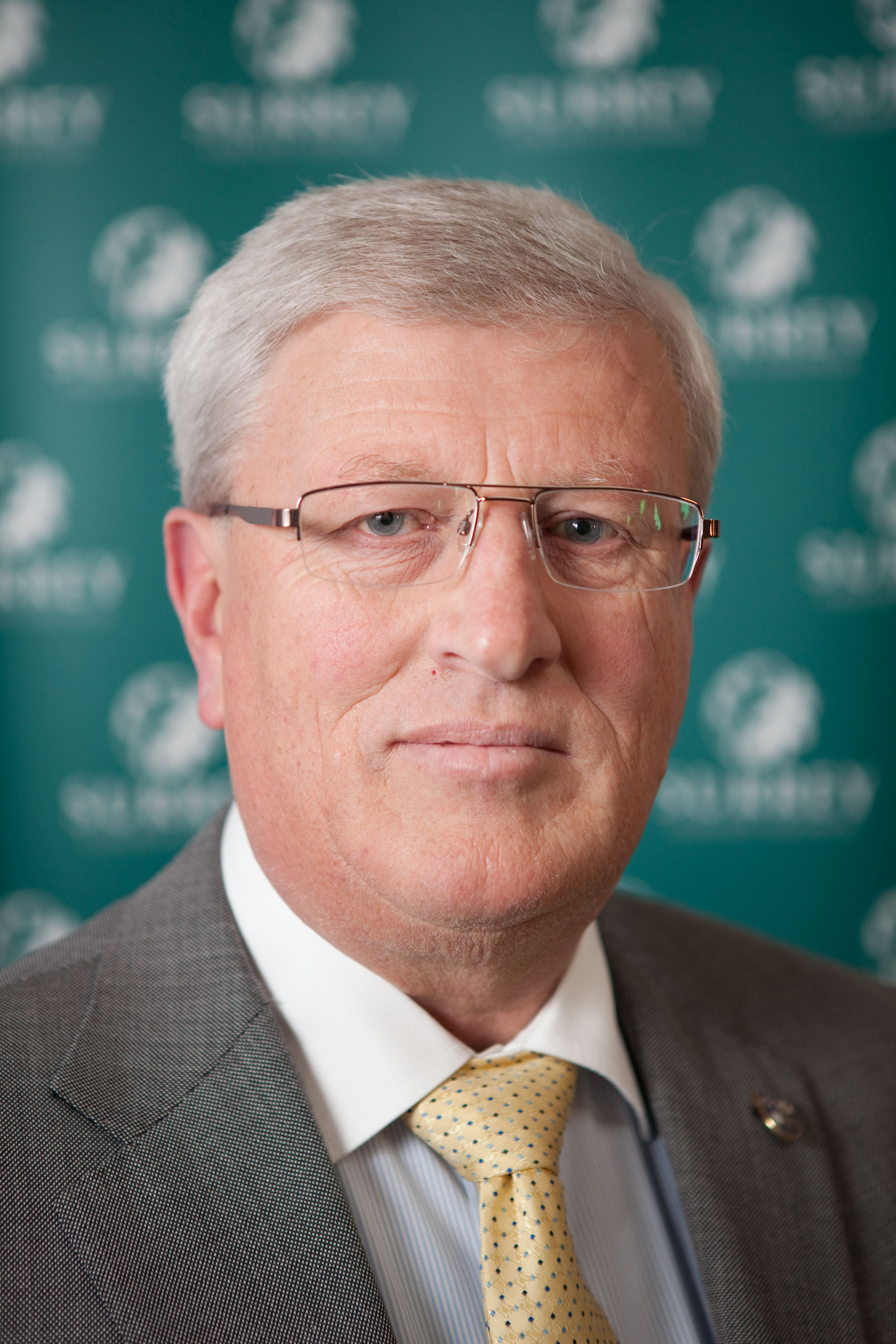

Leader of Surrey County Council
- In office 11 October 2011 – 11 December 2018
- Deputy: Peter Martin (2011-2018); John Furey (2018)
- Preceded by: Andrew Povey
- Succeeded by: Tim Oliver

Surrey County Councillor for Warlingham
- In office 5 May 2005 – 14 December 2018

Tandridge District Councillor for Queens Park
- In office 21 May 1997 – 11 June 2004

Personal details
- Party: Conservative

David Hodge CBE is a Conservative Party politician who was Leader of Surrey County Council from 2011 to 2018. He previously served as the council's deputy leader.

He was previously a Tandridge District Councillor for the ward of Queens Park from 1997 to 2004.

He was appointed a CBE in the 2017 New Year Honours for services to local government and charity.
