= Hownsgill Viaduct =

British railway bridge

Coordinates: 54°50′8.16″N 1°51′9.1″W

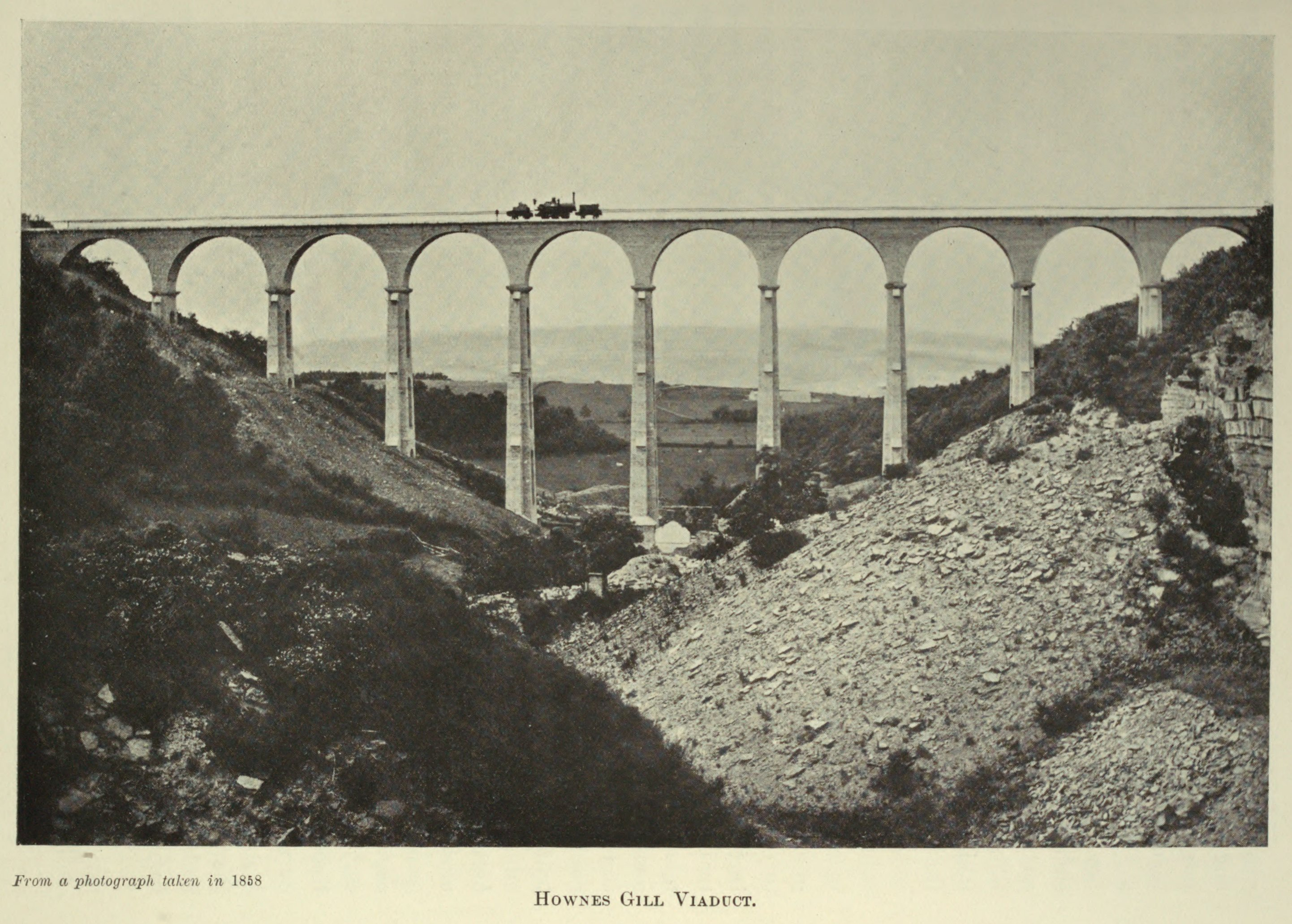
Hownsgill Viaduct in 1858

The Hownsgill Viaduct (in some sources called Hownes Gill Viaduct and locally called the Gill bridge) is a former railway bridge located west of Consett in County Durham, England. It is currently used as a footpath and cycleway.

== Background ==
From July 1832 to May 1834, Robert Stephenson was consulting engineer to the industrial Stanhope and Tyne Railway (S&TR), built to transport limestone from Stanhope to Consett, and then with coal onwards to Tyne Dock in South Shields. However, the company was unable to afford a bridge over the 49-metre (161 ft) deep and 244-metre (801 ft) wide dry valley, Hown's Gill. The company hence authorised Stephenson to construct two steep rope-worked inclines, one at 1:2.5 and a second at 1:3. To enable wagons to be transported from Waskerley to Consett and onwards to Annfield Plain, single wagons were carried sideways in cradles worked by a single stationary steam engine located at the bottom of the gorge. On 15 May 1834, the first 15.25-mile (24.54 km) section from Stanhope to Annfield opened.

After the S&TR sold its assets in 1842, while the northern section from Annfield became part of the Pontop and South Shields Railway, the now abandoned southern section was bought by the Derwent Iron Company.

After the West Durham Railway constructed a line to Crook, the Stockton and Darlington Railway (S&DR) began construction of the Weardale Extension Railway to Crook, which opened on 8 November 1843 from a junction on its leased Weardale Railway.

As a result, the DIC proposed an extension from Crook to the foot of the Meeting Slacks incline, which later became Waskerley, to provide a southern shipping route for their lime and iron products. Having obtained an extension of their right of way from the Bishop of Durham, the DIC submitted the planes to the S&DR, who agreed to the extension as long as the DIC leased the entire southern section of the former S&TR to them. The Stanhope to Carrhouse section passed into the possession of the S&DR on 1 January 1845, with the completed 10-mile (16 km) Weardale Extension Railway from the Wear Valley Junction to Waskerley opening on 16 May 1845.

== Construction ==
Having taken over the line, the S&DR proposed to bypass Hown's Gill through construction of a suitable bridge. They commissioned Thomas Bouch to design and supervise the construction of such a structure. Bouch's design was submitted to Stephenson, who recommended the use of inverted arches under the five central piers to reduce ground loading.

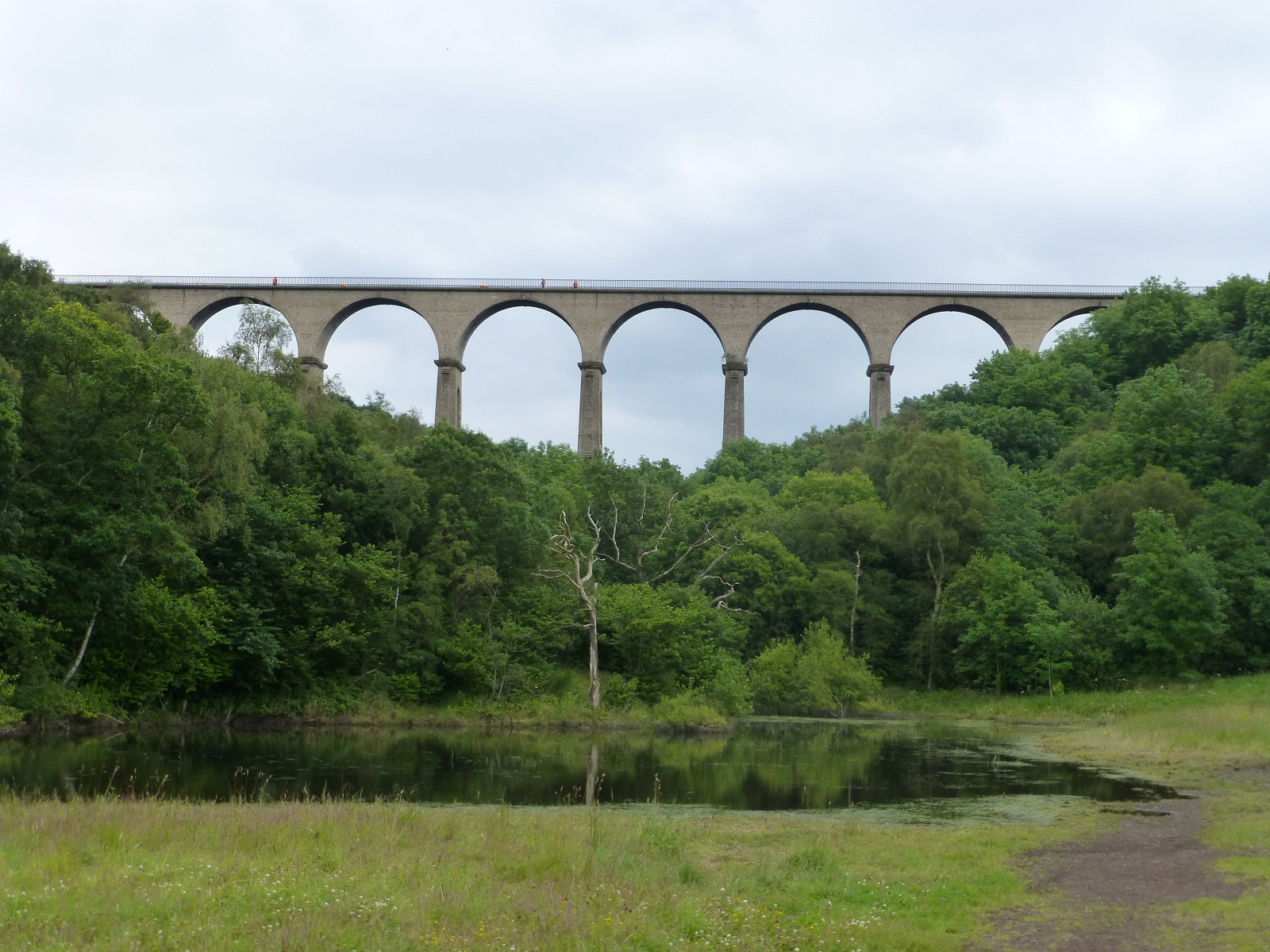
Hownsgill Viaduct, August 2012

The construction tender was won by John Anderson, who started works in 1857, with Rowley created to enable the workers to access the site. Three million white firebricks were used in the structure, with sandstone Ashlar dressings, and iron railings along the platform. The completed single-track bridge opened in 1858, 700 feet (210 m) long and at maximum 150 feet (46 m) high, spanned by twelve 50-foot (15 m) wide arches on slender triple-tiered piers, with arched recesses in three layers on each side.

== Present ==
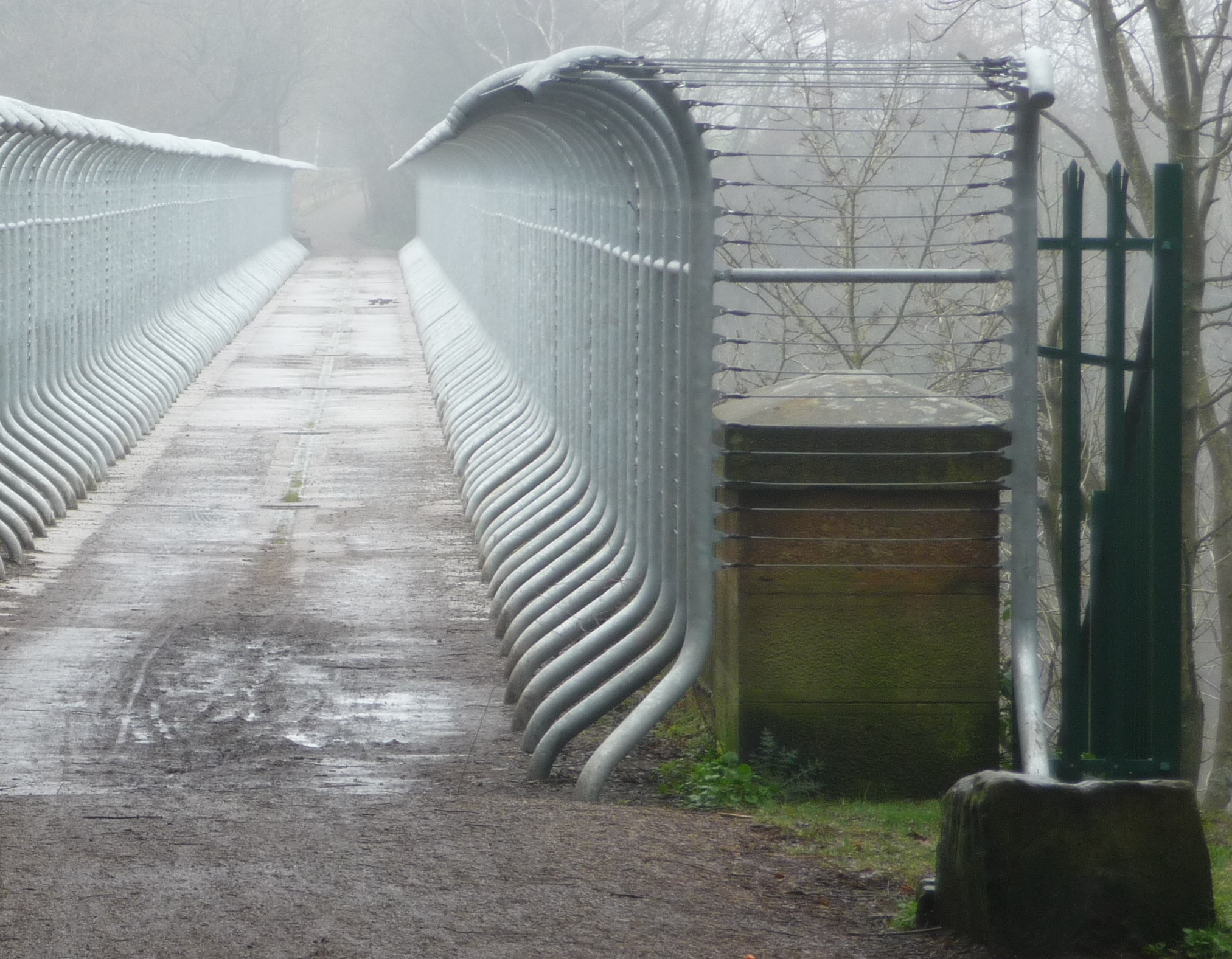
Hownsgill Viaduct with its anti-suicide fence, March 2014

The railway was closed to regular passenger services on 23 May 1955. The line was fully closed in the early 1980s, with the tracks lifted by 1985.

The viaduct is now part of the Sustrans national foot and cycle path network as part of the Sea to Sea Cycle Route, which crosses from Whitehaven/Workington on the west coast to Sunderland/Tynemouth on the east coast.

The viaduct can also be reached from the A692 road between Consett and Castleside using a footpath southward from outside the "Stanefordham Inn" (now called The Dam Inn) to the east of "The Grove" housing estate. The viaduct is about .5 miles (0.80 km) walk.

In 2012 anti-suicide fences were fitted to the bridge: there had been one suicide from the bridge every two weeks in the first half of 2011 and five between January and August 2012. Despite this, in August 2017 a woman fell to her death from the "wrong" side of the anti-suicide fence.
