= Blackhill railway station =

Disused railway station in Blackhill, Consett

Blackhill
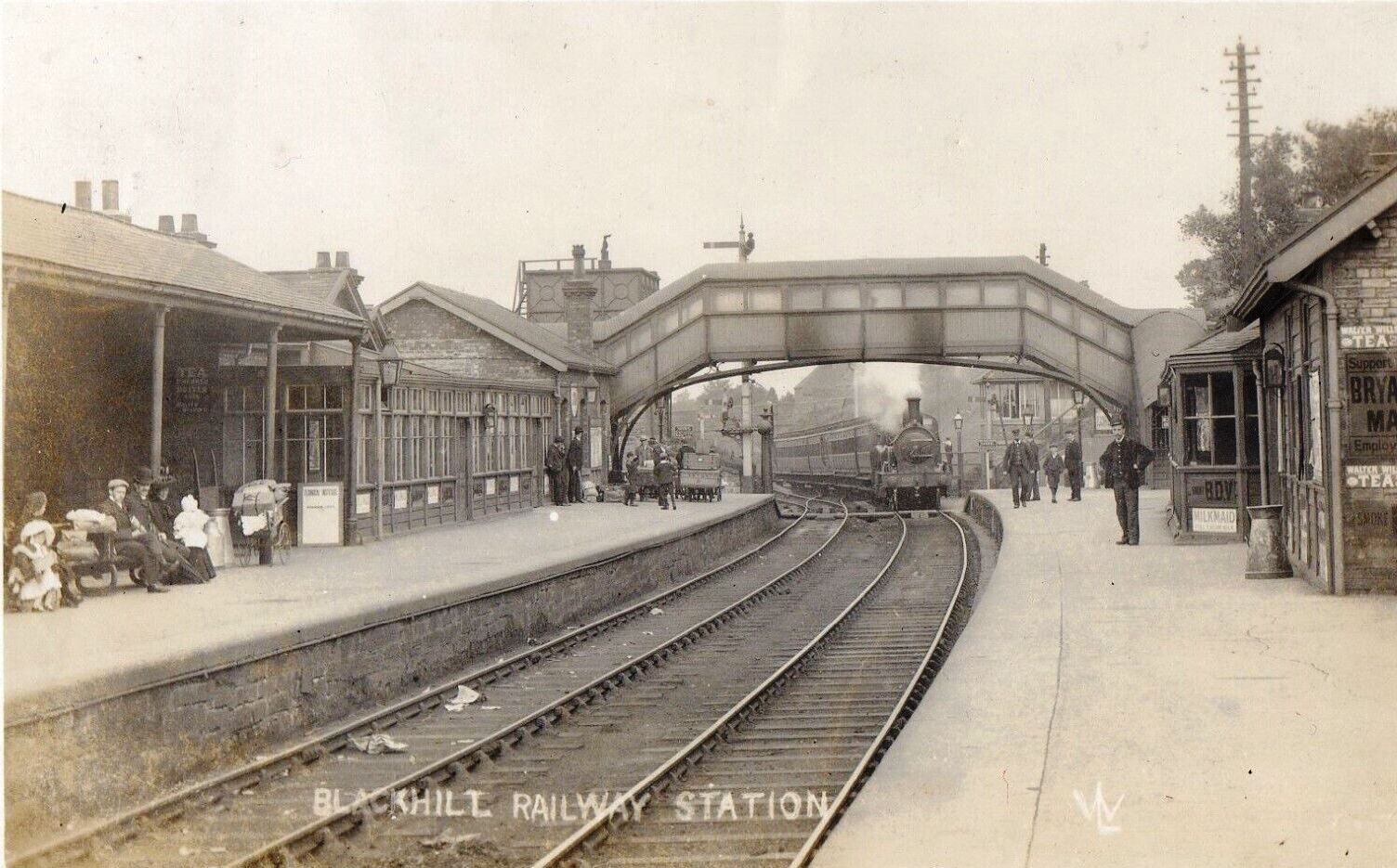

General information
- Location: Blackhill, County Durham; England
- Coordinates: 54.8587°N 1.8461°W
- Grid reference: NZ099515
- Platforms: 2

Other information
- Status: Disused

History
- Original company: North Eastern Railway
- Pre-grouping: North Eastern Railway
- Post-grouping: LNER; British Rail (North Eastern)

Key dates
- 2 December 1867: Opened as Benfieldside
- 1 November 1882: Renamed Consett
- 1 May 1885: Renamed Consett & Blackhill
- 1 May 1896: Renamed Blackhill
- 23 May 1955: Closed to passengers
- 1963: Closed completely
Location

Blackhill railway station served the village of Blackhill, County Durham, England from 1867 to 1955 on the Derwent Valley Line.

== History ==
The station opened on 2 December 1867 by the North Eastern Railway. It was situated west of the end of St. Aldans Street. The site of the station was large, serving as the terminus of three different routes - the Derwent Valley line from Scotswood, the Stanhope and Tyne Railway and the Lanchester Valley Railway from Durham; it also had a large goods yard. It opened as Benfieldside, then renamed Consett on 1 November 1882, renamed Consett & Blackhill on 1 May 1885 and finally renamed Blackhill on 1 May 1896.

The station was closed to passengers on 23 May 1955 with the end of services from Newcastle via Annfield Plain. Services from Durham via Lanchester had ceased back in 1939, whilst the Derwent Valley line from Scotswood followed suit in February 1954.

Goods traffic over the Derwent Valley line ended in November 1963 and the line through the station was abandoned; the track was lifted a year later. The former coal yard sidings immediately to the south though remained in use until 1984 by trains accessing the Consett Steel Works complex.

The station has been demolished and the trackbed is now a walking and cycle path known as the Derwent Walk. This path, stretching from Consett to Swalwell and running roughly parallel to the A694, forms part of National Cycle Network route 14 and is a northern spur of the C2C Cross Country cycle route.

Preceding station	Disused railways	Following station
Shotley Bridge; Line and station closed	North Eastern Railway; Derwent Valley Railway	Consett; Line and station closed
Rowley; Line and station closed	North Eastern Railway; Derwent Railway	Terminus
Knitsley; Line and station closed	North Eastern Railway; Lanchester Valley Railway	Terminus
