= Burnhill Junction railway station =

Military station in County Durham, England

Burnhill Junction/Saltersgate Ammunition Depot
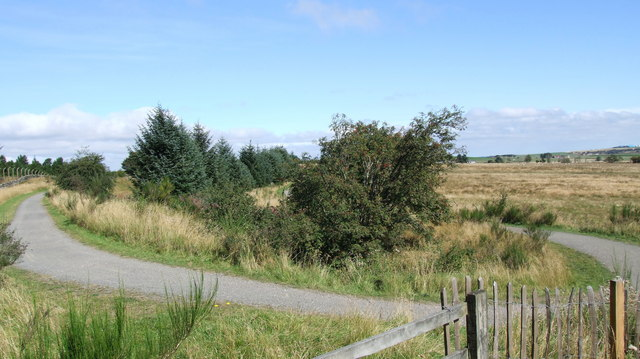

General information
- Location: Waskerley, County Durham; England
- Coordinates: 54.79262°N 1.89813°W
- Platforms: 0

Other information
- Status: Disused

History
- Original company: Ministry of Supply
- Pre-grouping: Ministry of Public Building and Works
- Post-grouping: Ministry of Public Building and Works

Key dates
- 1939: Depot opened
- 1969: Depot and line closed
Location

Burnhill Junction was a military railway goods station that served the Saltersgate Ammunition Depot in the village of Waskerley in County Durham, England. It was located at the junction of both the Bishop Auckland and Weardale Railway line from Bishop Auckland to Blackhill between Wear Valley Junction and Tow Law and the Stanhope and Tyne Railway between Stanhope and Consett.

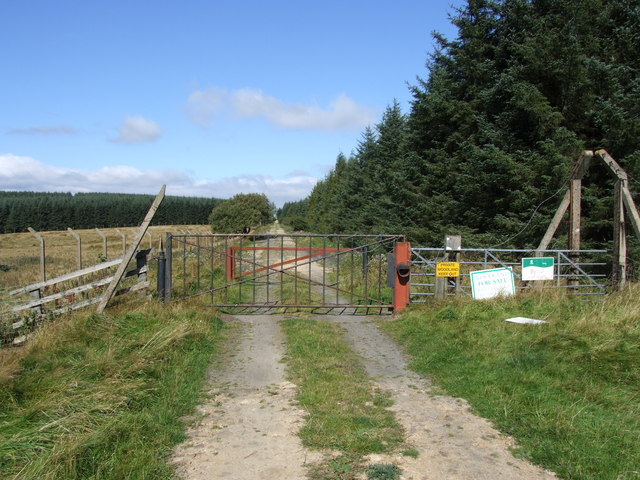
The former gate to the depot along the former railway line near Saltersgate Cottage station to Burnhill Junction

== History ==
The station was opened by the Ministry of Supply in 1939 and was used for transporting munitions between World War II and the Cold War. It was closed in 1969. The station was not open for public train services, although it may have been used by military personnel. The site is now derelict. The former railway line forms part of the Waskerley Way between Tow Law and Consett.

Preceding station	Historical railways	Following station
Burnhill; Line and station closed	North Eastern Railway; Weardale Extension Railway (Consett Branch) and (Stanhope Branch) (Not in use by the depot for passengers)	Saltersgate Cottage; Line and station closed
Waskerley; Line and station closed	North Eastern Railway; Weardale Extension Railway (Consett Branch) and (Stanhope Branch) (Not in use by the depot for passengers)	Saltersgate Cottage; Line and station closed
