= Consett railway station =

Former railway station in England

Consett
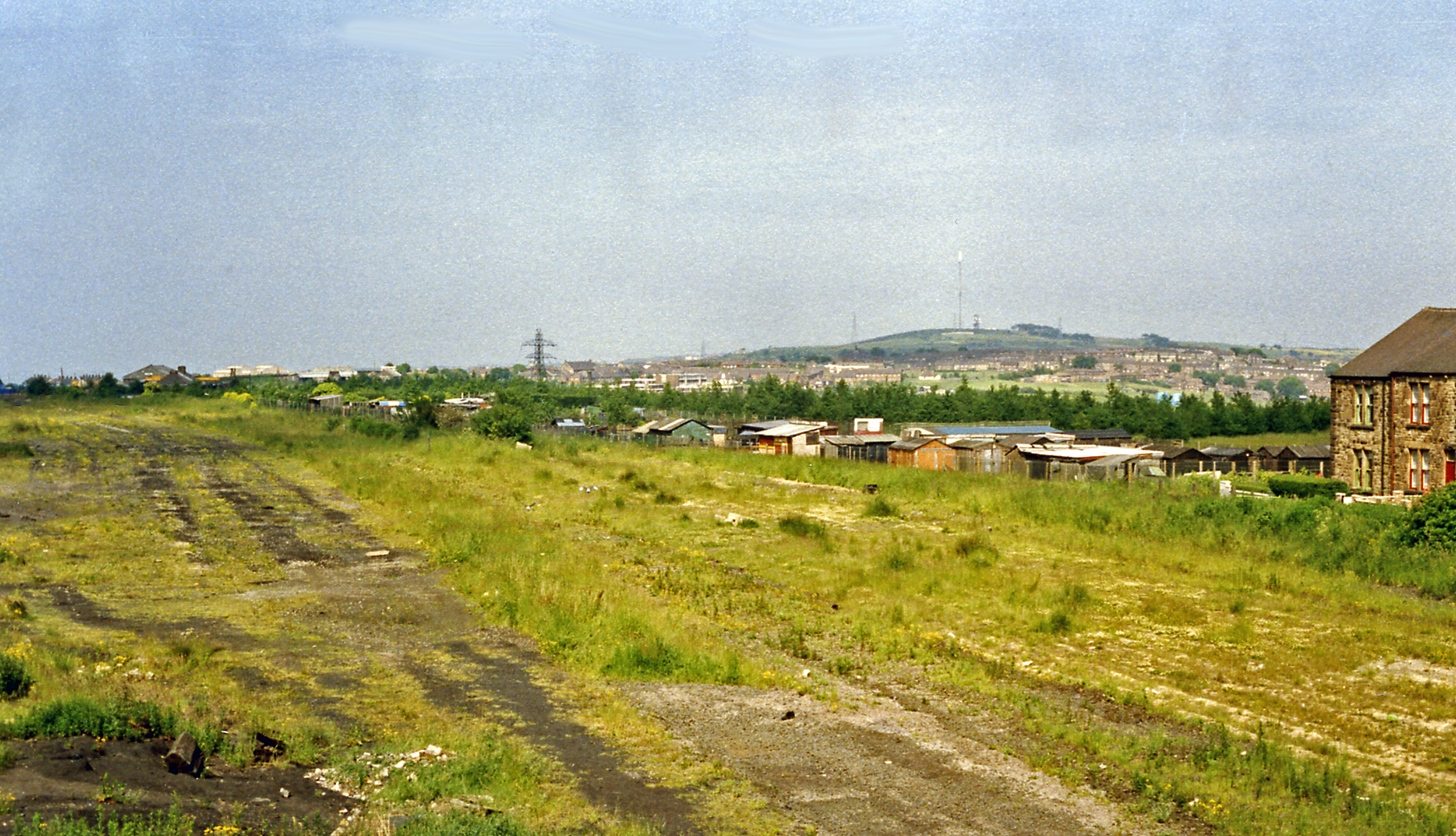
- Consett railway station site in 1988, after demolition, view northeast towards Annfield Plain

General information
- Location: Consett, County Durham; England
- Coordinates: 54.8510°N 1.8273°W
- Platforms: 2

Other information
- Status: Disused

History
- Original company: North Eastern Railway
- Pre-grouping: North Eastern Railway
- Post-grouping: London and North Eastern Railway

Key dates
- 17 August 1896: Opened
- 23 May 1955: Closed to passengers
- 2 October 1967: Closed to goods
Location

Consett was a railway station built by the North Eastern Railway on the route of the Stanhope and Tyne Railway, in County Durham, North East England. It served the industrial town of Consett from 1896 until 1980.

== History ==
Opened on 17 August 1896 by the North Eastern Railway, it became part of the London and North Eastern Railway during the Grouping of 1923. The station then passed on to the North Eastern Region of British Railways on nationalisation in 1948.

It was not the first station to serve the town, as one had been opened by the NER in 1862 as the terminus of its Lanchester Valley Railway from Durham. That station lasted only five years, as the LVR was extended northwards to Newcastle via Lintz Green & Scotswood and a new station was opened at Benfieldside on the northern edge of the town. This was renamed "Consett" in 1882 and again to "Consett & Blackhill" (as it was closer to the latter community) in 1885, before eventually becoming Blackhill when the 1896 depot opened. This station was located on the former S&T route east of the intersection with the Durham - Blackhill - Scotswood line and opened on the same day that passenger trains began running to Newcastle via Annfield Plain and a junction with the East Coast Main Line near Birtley (a chord line having been built by the NER to link the main line with the S&T route where they crossed each other). Travelers from the new station could also use the Derwent Valley line via Blackhill to reach Newcastle by means of a link line between the two routes that had been commissioned in 1893 - this alternative route was actually a couple of miles shorter but had a less frequent service. Facilities were quite basic, with wooden buildings in the middle of the island platform linked via a sloping path to the road overbridge at the eastern end.

Passenger services on the Derwent Valley line via Lintz Green were withdrawn by the British Transport Commission north of Blackhill on 1 February 1954 and those on the line from Ouston Junction to Blackhill followed on 23 May 1955, with the station closing to passenger traffic on that date. The line from Blackhill closed to all traffic in 1963.

Goods traffic continued to be handled at Consett until 2 October 1967, The ex-S&T line through the station latterly remained in use to serve the nearby steelworks until they closed in September 1980 and then subsequently for the demolition trains used to clear the site. The last passenger train (a railtour special) called on 17 March 1984 and the line closed completely shortly afterwards, despite calls to reinstate passenger services from Newcastle to serve the town and the Beamish Museum. The tracks were lifted later that year and the station demolished.

== Present and future ==
The site of the station and the lines on approach to it were lost when the A692 road was realigned, following the dismantling of the railway through it.

However, in June 2020, MP for North West Durham, Richard Holden, sponsored a bid to the Ideas Fund of the Department for Transport's Restoring Your Railway Fund, hoping to access up to £50,000 to cover the cost of an initial study into the feasibility of restoring a rail link between Consett and Blaydon. In November 2020 it was announced that the requested funds would be provided for such a study into reinstating a rail service between Consett and Newcastle, although it was unclear where the Consett terminus of such a rail link would be located and whether this study would focus on the former Derwent Valley Railway or also include the former S&TR route.

Preceding station	Historical railways	Following station
Blackhill; Line and station closed	London and North Eastern Railway; Blackhill-Birtley line	Leadgate; Line and station closed
Rowley; Line and station closed	North Eastern Railway; Stanhope and Tyne Railway	Carrhouse; Line and station closed
