= Beamish railway station =

Former railway station in County Durham, England

Beamish
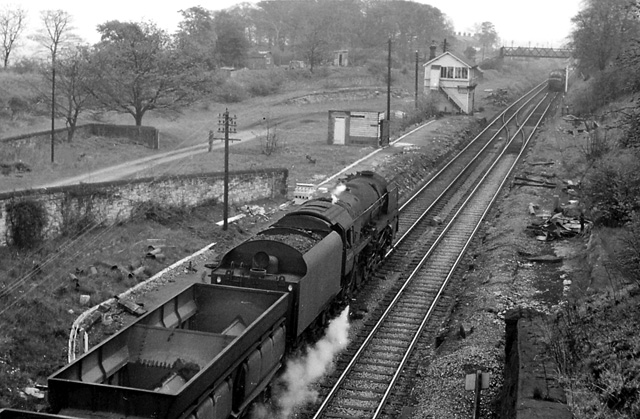
- The site of the station in 1965

General information
- Location: Beamish, County Durham, England
- Coordinates: 54.8769°N 1.6526°W

Other information
- Status: Disused

History
- Original company: North Eastern Railway
- Pre-grouping: North Eastern Railway
- Post-grouping: London and North Eastern Railway; British Railways (North Eastern)

Key dates
- 1 February 1894: Opened
- 21 September 1953: Closed to passengers
- 2 August 1960: Closed to goods
Location

Beamish railway station served the village of Beamish, in County Durham, England, from 1894 to 1953. The station was built by the North Eastern Railway on the Beamish Deviation Line, off the earlier Stanhope and Tyne Railway.

== History ==
The station opened on 1 February 1894 by the North Eastern Railway. The signal box was to the south and, to the east, was a goods shed with four sidings and a loading bank.

Passenger numbers started to decline in the 1920s when bus services were introduced. This led to the station closing on 21 September 1953. It remained open to goods until 2 August 1960.

The station itself was demolished but the signal box remained until 1982. After it was demolished, the signal box from Carrhouse was dismantled and installed at the nearby Beamish Museum.

Preceding station	Historical railways	Following station
Pelton; Line and station closed	North Eastern Railway; Stanhope and Tyne Railway	West Stanley; Line and station closed

=== Accident ===
On 9 December 1964, 23 coal wagons uncoupled from a shunter and ran down the line until colliding with another goods train. This resulted in one death and the line being blocked for several days. Sixty men had to work on cleaning up the debris while the trains were diverted via Lanchester.
