= West Stanley railway station =

Former railway station in County Durham, England

West Stanley
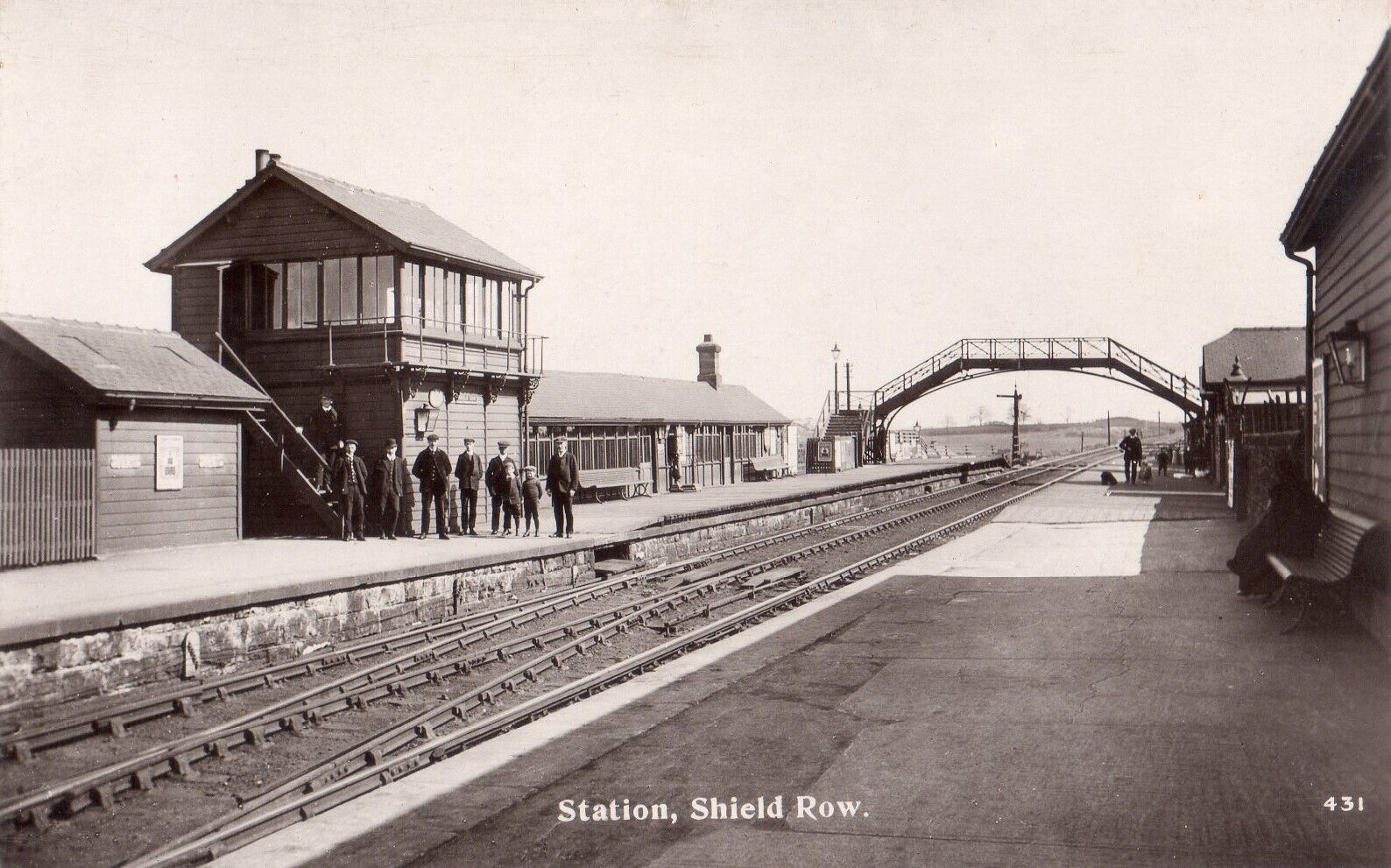

General information
- Location: Stanley, County Durham, England
- Coordinates: 54.8779°N 1.6933°W
- Grid reference: NZ197537

Other information
- Status: Disused

History
- Original company: North Eastern Railway
- Pre-grouping: North Eastern Railway
- Post-grouping: London and North Eastern Railway

Key dates
- 1 February 1894: Opened as Shield Row
- 1 February 1934: Renamed West Stanley
- 23 May 1955: Closed to regular passenger services
Location

West Stanley railway station served the town of Stanley, in County Durham, England, on the North Eastern Railway between 1894 and 1955.

== History ==
The loop line between Annfield Plain and Pelton was built by the North Eastern Railway (NER); it opened for freight trains on 1 January 1886. This deviation line allowed several steep rope-worked inclines (on the former Pontop and South Shields Railway section of the old Stanhope and Tyne Railway) to be avoided. Passenger stations on the loop line, including Shield Row, were opened on 1 February 1894. The final section of the deviation between Pelton and Birtley was opened for freight trains in 1893, and for passenger trains in 1896.

On 1 January 1923, the NER amalgamated with other companies to form the London and North Eastern Railway (LNER). On 1 February 1934, the LNER renamed the station West Stanley.

The station was closed to regular passenger services on 23 May 1955.

Preceding station	Disused railways	Following station
Annfield Plain; Line and station closed	North Eastern Railway; Annfield Plain Deviation	Beamish; Line and station closed

== The site today ==
There is nothing to suggest that there was ever a station at the location. Most of the station site is now just an open grassy space; a row of garages have been built where the station buildings once stood. On the approaches to the station from Beamish, there used to be two substantial bridges that took the line over the A692 road; both have been demolished since closure and replaced by footbridges.
