= Crawleyside =

Village in County Durham, England

Coordinates: 54.757°N 2.012°W

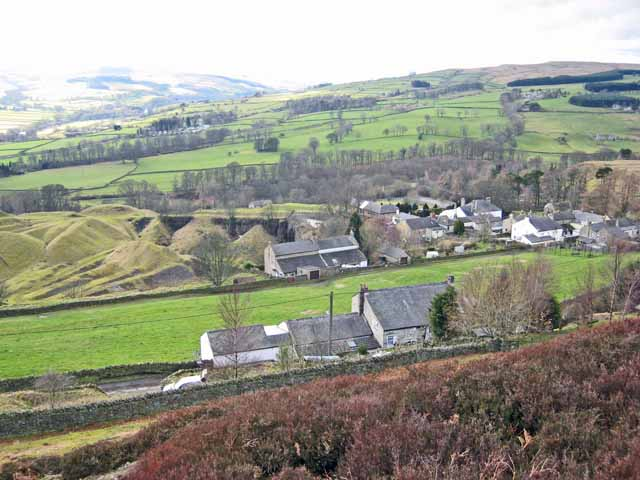
- Crawleyside

- Location within County Durham
- Population: 170 (2001 census)
- OS grid reference: NY993402
- Civil parish: Stanhope
- Unitary authority: County Durham
- Ceremonial county: County Durham
- Region: North East
- Country: England
- Sovereign state: United Kingdom
- Post town: Bishop Auckland
- Postcode district: DL13
- Dialling code: 01388
- Police: Durham
- Fire: County Durham and Darlington
- Ambulance: North East
- UK Parliament: North West Durham

Crawleyside is a village in the civil parish of Stanhope, in County Durham, England. It is situated to the north of Stanhope, in Weardale. In the 2001 census Crawleyside had a population of 170.

Crawleyside is on the B6278 road from Stanhope to Edmundbyers and Consett. For cyclists, the 1-in-5 (20%) ascent north through the village is described as "punishing". Crawleyside is described by the author of a walking guide published in 1883 as "a pictureque spot on the hillside immediately overlooking Stanhope; the ascent is rather steep but the prospect is unsurpassed". The settlement is simply named Crawley on an Ordnance Survey map published in 1861.

The short-lived Crawley railway station was in operation, 1845–6. The Hogg Hill tunnel entrances north of the village on the Stanhope and Tyne Railway were built in 1832–3 and are Grade II listed. They were designed by T. E. Harrison, with Robert Stephenson as consulting engineer. The railway transported lime from the lime kilns at Lanehead Quarry, west of the village to Consett Ironworks. Earlier lime kilns from 1834 were superseded by a more substantial set in 1845, which were in operation until 1901. Ironstone, whinstone and lead had also been mined and processed, but from 1930 onwards only the quarrying of limestone took place. In 1938 some of the lime kilns were brought back into use and it was not until the 1960s that processing ceased for good, after which the site was cleared.

The Crawley Edge Cairns, in a field to the west of the village are a series of forty-two Bronze Age cairns.
