= Burnhill railway station =

Disused railway station in Waskerley, County Durham

Burnhill
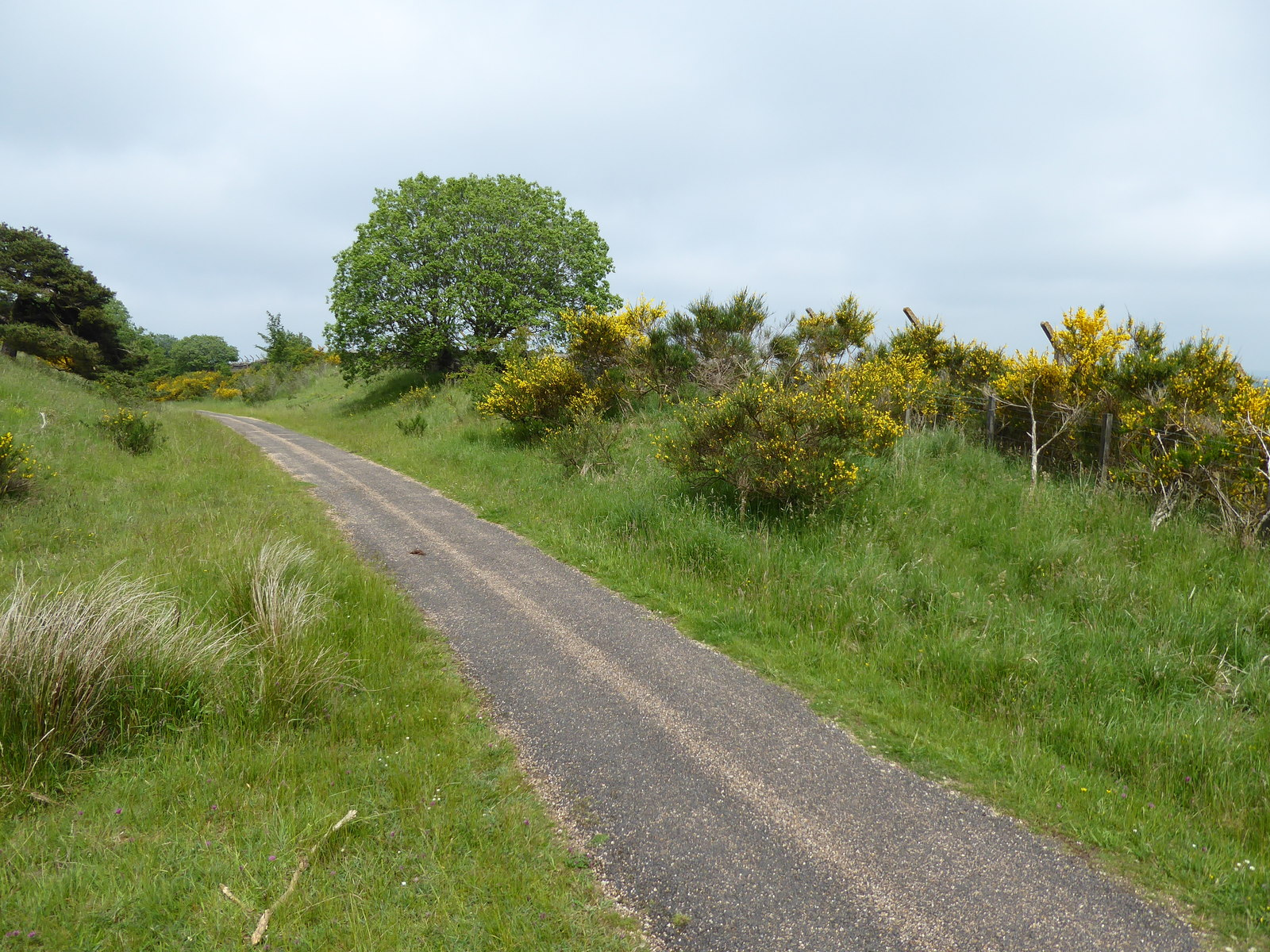
- The site of the station in 2020

General information
- Location: Waskerley, County Durham; England
- Coordinates: 54.7972°N 1.9019°W
- Grid reference: NZ064447

Other information
- Status: Disused

History
- Original company: North Eastern Railway
- Pre-grouping: North Eastern Railway

Key dates
- 4 July 1859: Opened as Burn Hill Junction
- 1 May 1893: Name changed to Burn Hill
- 1908: Name changed to Burnhill
- 1 May 1939: Closed
Location

Burnhill railway station served the village of Waskerley, County Durham, England, from 1859 to 1939 on the Stanhope and Tyne Railway.

== History ==
The station opened as Burn Hill Junction on 4 July 1859 by the North Eastern Railway. It was situated 200 yards north of Burnhill Junction (a military use only station). Its name was changed to Burn Hill on 1 May 1893 and changed to Burnhill in 1908.. It closed to passengers and goods traffic on 1 May 1939.

Preceding station	Historical railways	Following station
Rowley; Line and station closed	Stanhope and Tyne Railway (Consett Branch)	Saltersgate Cottage; Line and station closed
