= Crawley railway station (Durham) =

Short-lived railway station in Crawleyside, County Durham

Crawley

General information
- Location: Crawleyside, County Durham; England
- Coordinates: 54.7549°N 2.0163°W
- Grid reference: NY990400
- Platforms: 1

Other information
- Status: Disused

History
- Original company: Stanhope and Tyne Railway
- Pre-grouping: Stanhope and Tyne Railway

Key dates
- 1 September 1845: Opened
- 31 October 1845: Closed
- 1 April 1846: Reopened
- 31 December 1846: Closed
Location

Crawley railway station served the village of Crawleyside, County Durham, England, from 1845 to 1846 on the Stanhope and Tyne Railway.

== History ==
The station was opened on 1 September 1845 by the Stanhope and Tyne Railway. It closed on 31 October of the same year but reopened on 1 April 1846, only to close again on 31 December 1846. It appeared in timetables as the early name for Park Head.

Preceding station	Disused railways	Following station
Terminus	Stanhope and Tyne Railway	Waskerley; Line and station closed
