= John Harris (engineer) =

British railway engineer

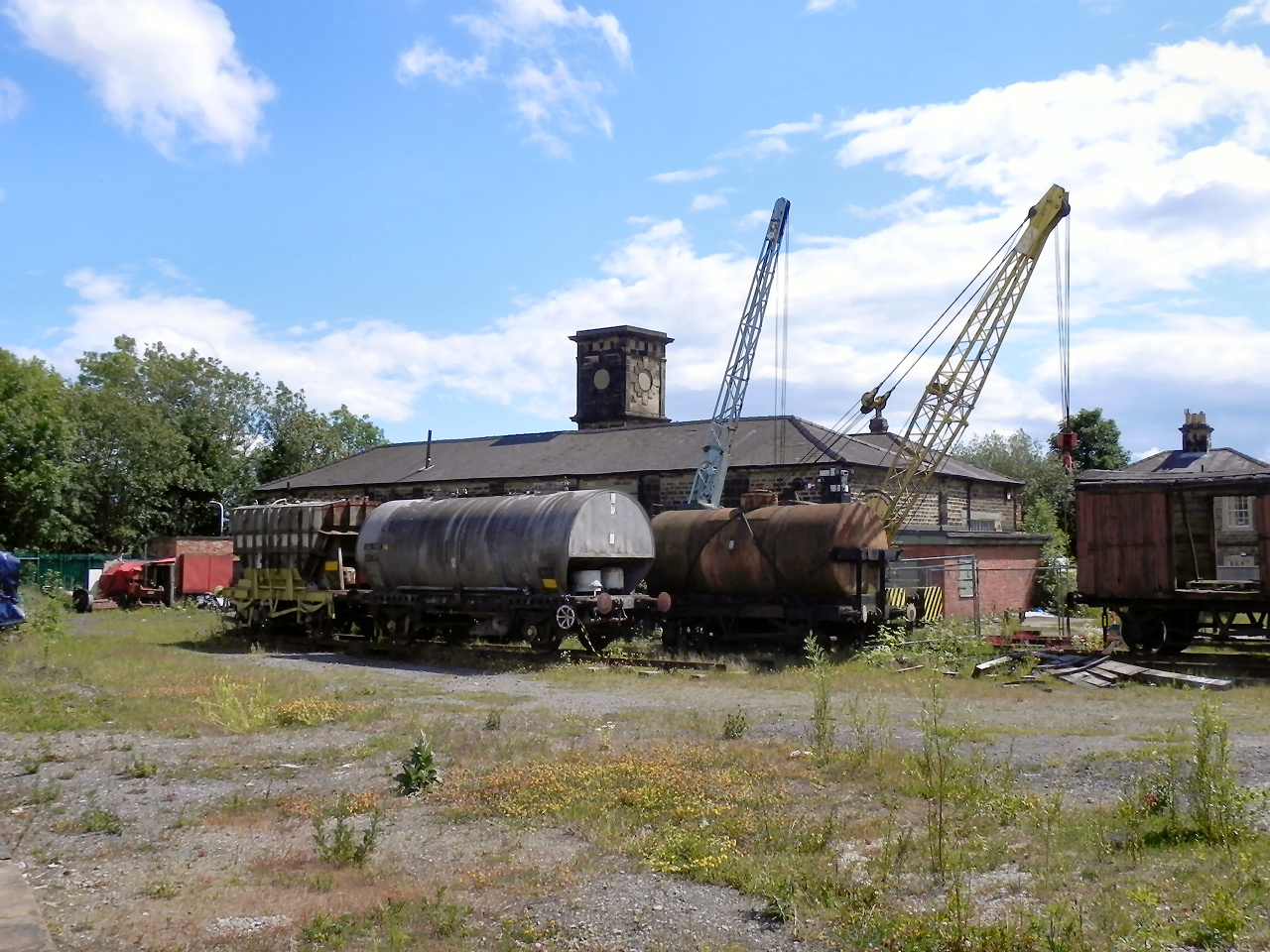
Goods Shed, Darlington North Road, 1839-40

John Harris (16 July 1812 - 20 July 1869) was a railway engineer who worked on the Stockton and Darlington Railway from 1836 to 1847.

== Personal life ==
He was born on 16 July 1812 in Maryport, Cumbria, the son of William Harris, a sailcloth manufacturer who was bankrupted in the financial crisis of 1816, and his wife Sarah.

He married Mary Ann Mason on 24 September 1838 at the Friends' Meeting House, Penrith, but she died in 1839. He married secondly Mary Wilson on 11 April 1844 at Kendal and they had 5 children:

- Mary Elizabeth Harris (1845-1852)
- John William Harris (1851-1852)
- Ernest Wilson Harris (1852-1857)
- John Wilson Harris (1853-1962)
- Bertha Harris (b. 1856)

He died on 20 July 1869 in Kendal after an attack of jaundice.

== Career ==
He trained under Thomas Storey, Civil and Mining Engineer in St Helen Auckland.

In 1836 he was appointed resident engineer to the Stockton and Darlington Railway, replacing Thomas Storey, a position he held until around 1847. During this tenure he was responsible for the railway approaches to the Middlesbrough Dock and the coal staithes.

He also built a railway bridge across the River Tees at Stockton which was designed by Robert Stephenson, replacing an earlier suspension bridge. He also designed the Middlesbrough and Redcar railway, and the Weardale Extension Railway from Crook to Waskerley, part of the Wear Valley Railway.

He was also involved in the construction of the railway between Wakefield, Pontefract and Goole railway and the Kendal to Windermere Railway.

He was appointed a Member of the Institute of Civil Engineers in 1841.

In 1853 he became involved in the Hope Town Foundry, Darlington, and later went into partnership with Mr. Summerson. From 1863 - 1869, the foundry constructed about twelve steam locomotives. He was also a partner in the South Durham Iron Company.

Later in life he became the principal assistant to Joseph Pease in his political career.

He is thought to have been significantly affected by the collapse of the bank of Overend, Gurney and Company in 1866 which resulted in him selling many of his assets.

== Works ==
- (first) Middlesbrough railway station 1838 (from 1846 a goods station)
- Goods Shed, Darlington North Road, 1839-40 (expanded from original 1832 building)
- Middlesbrough Docks 1839-41
- Coal Drops, Middlesbrough Docks 1840-41
- Tees Suspension Bridge, Stockton 1841 (designed by Robert Stephenson)
- Weardale Extension Railway 1843-45
- Kendal and Windermere Railway 1845-47
