= Pelton railway station =

Former railway station in County Durham, England

Pelton

General information
- Location: Pelton Fell, County Durham, England
- Coordinates: 54.8645°N 1.6077°W
- Grid reference: NZ252522
- Platforms: 2

Other information
- Status: Disused

History
- Original company: North Eastern Railway
- Pre-grouping: North Eastern Railway
- Post-grouping: London and North Eastern Railway; British Railways (North Eastern region)

Key dates
- 1860: First station opened
- June 1869: First station closed
- 1 February 1894: Second station opened
- 23 May 1955: Second station closed
Location

Pelton railway station served the village of Pelton, in County Durham, England, between 1860 and 1955. It was a stop on the Stanhope and Tyne Railway.

== History ==
The first station was opened in 1860 by the North Eastern Railway. It was only used for recreational journeys on Saturdays only after 6pm, but this disappeared from the timetables in June 1869.

The second station opened on 1 February 1894. The station building was on the northbound platform and the signal box was on the southbound platform. The goods yard was behind the station building platform, which had a small goods shed and three sidings.

The station closed on 23 May 1955.

Preceding station	Historical railways	Following station
Vigo; Line and station closed	Stanhope and Tyne Railway	Beamish; Line and station closed

=== Accidents ===
On 21 April 1906, a deputy overman opened his door in an attempt to jump to the platform while the train was still moving. Despite passengers telling him not to, he did it anyway and was trapped between the footboard and the platform. The footboard had to be sawn to retrieve his corpse.

== The site today ==
The line continued to go used for freight, until the track was lifted in 1985; it now forms part of a shared-use path. Whilst the flat area that was once the small goods yard remains, there is nothing else to suggest that a station was there.
