= Leadgate railway station =

Disused railway station in Leadgate, England

Leadgate

General information
- Location: Leadgate, County Durham; England
- Coordinates: 54.8604°N 1.8029°W
- Grid reference: NZ127517
- Platforms: 2

Other information
- Status: Disused

History
- Original company: North Eastern Railway
- Pre-grouping: North Eastern Railway
- Post-grouping: LNER; British Railways (North Eastern Region)

Key dates
- 17 August 1896: Opened
- 23 May 1955: Closed to passengers
- 10 August 1964: Closed to goods
Location

Leadgate railway station served the village of Leadgate, County Durham, England, from 1896 to 1964 on the Stanhope and Tyne Railway.

== History ==
The station opened on 17 August 1896 by the North Eastern Railway. The signal box was at the east of the southbound platform. This controlled access to the goods yard, which had three sidings: two of which ran behind the northbound platform and the other ran up to the northbound platform. There were more sidings to the south which served Iveston Colliery and Crookhall Iron Foundry. Like the other stations on the line, the bus service introduced in the 1920s drastically decreased the passenger numbers at the station. It closed to passengers on 23 May 1955 and to goods traffic on 10 August 1964. The site is now occupied by St Ives Gardens.

| Preceding station | Historical railways | Following station |
|---|---|---|
| Annfield Plain; Line and station closed | Stanhope and Tyne Railway | Carrhouse; Line and station closed |
