= Consett Iron Company =

Industrial business based in England

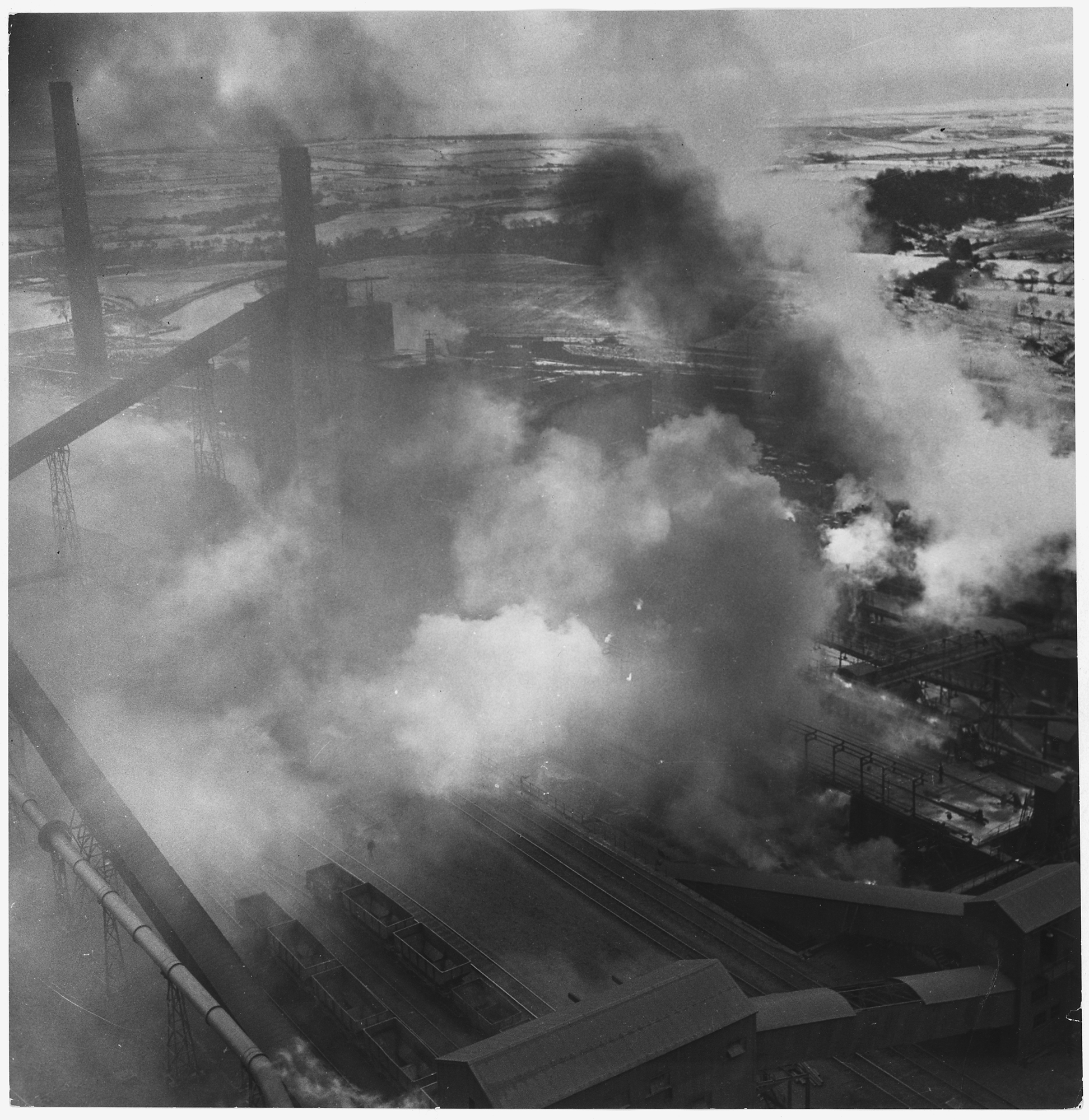
- Industry: Ironmaking
- Founded: 1864
- Defunct: 1980
- Headquarters: Consett, County Durham
- Products: Iron and steel
- Net income: £673 million (1900)
- Owner: British Steel Corporation (1967)
- Number of employees: 6,000 (1892)
- Website: http://www.dmm.org.uk/company/c002.htm

The Consett Iron Company Ltd was an industrial business based in the Consett area of County Durham in the United Kingdom. The company owned coal mines and limestone quarries, and manufactured iron and steel. It was registered on 4 April 1864 as successor to the Derwent and Consett Iron Company. This in turn was the successor to the Derwent Iron Company, founded in 1840.

The company's seven collieries and various coke ovens came into the ownership of the National Coal Board, when British coal companies were nationalised in 1947. The Consett Iron Company itself was nationalised in 1951, becoming part of the Iron and Steel Corporation of Great Britain. It was denationalised shortly afterwards, then renationalised in 1967. The Consett Iron Company was absorbed into British Steel Corporation in 1967, and the location became known as the Consett Steel Works. British Steel Consett Works was closed in 1980.

== Early history ==
In 1840 a group of local businessmen led by Jonathan Richardson set up the first of several iron companies in Consett (County Durham), the Derwent Iron Company, to quarry and smelt ironstone around the town. The best local ironstone (with the highest iron content) was exhausted soon after, so the company arranged for extensions to the local railways, such as the Stockton and Darlington Railway. These allowed it to access new sources of ironstone, including, from 1851 onwards, ore from the Cleveland Ironstone Formation near Eston, Cleveland. (Note: In 1842 the company bought the southern section of the former Stanhope and Tyne Railway from the company to enable it to access new sources of ironstone. After the West Durham Railway constructed a line to Crook, the Stockton and Darlington Railway (S&DR) began construction of the Weardale Extension Railway to Crook, which opened on 8 November 1843, from a junction on its leased Weardale Railway. As a result, the Derwent Iron Company proposed an extension from Crook to the foot of the Meeting Slacks incline, which latter became Waskerley station, to provide a southern shipping route for their lime and iron products, and to give access to more ironstone. Having obtained an extension of their right of way from the Bishop of Durham, the Derwent Iron Company submitted the plans to the S&DR, who agreed to the extension as long as the Derwent Iron Company leased the entire southern section of the former S&TR to them. The Stanhope to Carrhouse section passed into the possession of the S&DR on 1 January 1845, with the completed 10 miles (16 km) Weardale Extension Railway from the Wear Valley Junction to Waskerley opening on 16 May 1845.)

By 1857, Consett Iron Company owed the failed Northumberland and Durham District Bank almost a million pounds. (Note: This corresponds to a purchasing power of £98 million in 2013, using the Bank of England's inflation calculator.) It was put up for sale, but an attempted sale to the newly formed Derwent and Consett Iron Company fell through. On 4 April 1864, after operating for several years under the threat of bankruptcy, a new Consett Iron Company Ltd was formed with capital of £400,000. This was divided into 40,000 shares priced initially at £10 each, with Jonathan Priestman II as managing director. Two local members of parliament, Henry Fenwick and John Henderson, were among the directors. It became the owner of 18 blast furnaces. The company had the capacity to produce 80,000 tons of pig iron and 50,000 tons of finished iron per year. It also owned a thousand workers' cottages and 500 acres of land.

== Success under William Jenkins ==
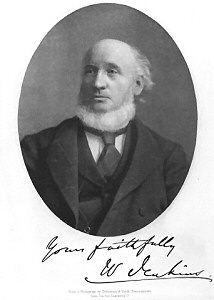
William Jenkins (1825–1895), general manager from 1869 to 1894

William Jenkins was Consett Iron Company's general manager from 1869 to 1894. Under his leadership, the company experienced sustained profit for the first time, despite severe fluctuations in market conditions, such as the industrial depression that took place from the late 1870s to the early 1890s. The company retained what at the time were large amounts of capital, rather than distributing money to shareholders. As a result it relied less on loans to survive business cycles and had lower interest rates when it did borrow. He also provided workers with schools, churches, a park, hospital, and other facilities. He died in 1895. The company's share of the British steel market reached a peak of 7.1% in 1894, falling to 4.2% by 1910. Business historians H. W. Richardson and J. M. Bass praised Jenkins's business judgement and choice of managers.

Varying profitability at Consett Iron Company
Year	Net Profit £'000s	Profit on Capital %
1865	39	12
1870	102	24.5
1875	215	33.7
1880	104	15.6
1885	60	8.6
1890	366	38.6
1895	115	8.6
1900	673	38.7
1905	245	13.6
1910	221	12.4

Around 1876, railways around the world began to use steel, instead of malleable iron, for rails. As a result, production at Consett fell by a third. The company switched production to iron plates, demand for which was rising rapidly for shipbuilding. In 1882, Consett Iron Company began to switch production again, this time to steel plates for shipbuilding using the Siemens-Martin process. This uses open hearth furnaces to convert pig iron to steel by burning off excess carbon. The first Siemens furnaces at Consett came into production in 1883. In 1887 the company began to produce steel in a variety of cross-sections, such as angle (L-section) steel, rolled joists and girders for shipbuilding. For this purpose it created the Angle Mills on a sixteen-acre site, able to produce 1,500 tons of angles, bars and girders per week.

By 1889, the Angle Mills site was the largest steel plate factory in the world. In 1892, in addition to steelmaking, the company had a foundry (a mile from Consett at Crookhall) capable of making 150 tons of iron castings per week, and a brickworks capable of making around 12,000 bricks per week. The estate had grown to roughly 2,700 workers' cottages. The company ran a 16-bed infirmary to treat injured workers. The 6,000 workers were paid an average of £5.33 a month. The company continually invested in modern equipment, such as a Roots blower (a powerful air pump) that was acquired in 1893.

== Twentieth century ==
William Jenkins was succeeded by the manager under him, George Ainsworth, who served as general manager from 1851 until his death in 1894. The company initially remained in profit, but its equipment and technology was not updated due to the lack of available space at Consett; a move was considered but rejected. The company did not switch to electrical power as others had and its technology became obsolete.

By 1924, the company had share capital of £3,500,000 (£185 million in 2013 terms); it had also issued £1,500,000 (£74 million in 2013 terms) in debenture stock in May 1922. In 1938, the company helped to finance the founding of the New Jarrow Steel Company from the old Palmers Shipbuilding and Iron Company which had collapsed in 1933, leading to the Jarrow March of 1936. The Consett Iron Company continued production during the Second World War using lower quality iron ore. It employed about 12,000 workers at that time.

In 1947 all of Consett Iron Company's coal mines were nationalised, coming under the control of the National Coal Board. In 1951, the rest of the Consett Iron Company was nationalised by Clement Attlee's Labour government into the short-lived Iron and Steel Corporation of Great Britain, along with all of Britain's steelworks. The Consett steelworks was privatised in 1955, and a new steel plate mill was opened in 1961 to supply the shipbuilding industry. About 6,000 workers were employed at the works at that time.

Consett Steel Works was renationalised in 1967, this time by Harold Wilson's government, into the British Steel Corporation, at a time when iron, coal and shipbuilding were all in steady decline in Britain. By this time British Steel had grown complacent, was running below capacity and was using obsolete technology. Raw material costs for coal and oil were rising and it lacked capital for new manufacturing equipment. Government policy to keep employment artificially high increased the organisation's difficulties.

== Closure ==
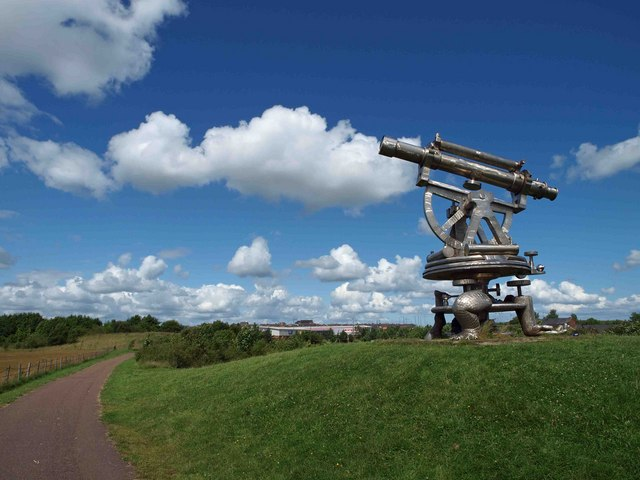
Terra Novalis Stainless steel sculpture beside the coast-to-coast (C2C) path at Consett.

Amidst intense debate and large demonstrations by workers and sympathizers, Consett Steel Works was closed in 1980. Around 3,000 to 4,000 workers lost their jobs, resulting in an unemployment rate of 35% in Consett, twice the national average at the time.

The sky over Consett, which had long been famous for its thick haze of red iron oxide dust thrown up by the steelworks, cleared as did the cloud of steam typically found around the tall cooling towers and chimneys. Some Consett steel workers took part in the demolition.

Almost all traces of the Consett steelworks have been removed. Only the Terra Novalis sculptures (pictured), made with materials from the site, recall past industry. Employment gradually returned to the area in the following decade, with a more diversified industrial base.

== Sources ==
- Jenkins, William. Description of the Consett Iron Works. Mawson, Swan and Morgan, Newcastle upon Tyne, 1892. Reprinted as Consett Iron Works in 1893. Ad Publishing, 2008.
- Richardson, H. W., Bass, J. M. The Profitability of Consett Iron Company Before 1914. Business History, Vol. 7, Issue 2, 1965. Pages 71–93. DOI: 10.1080/00076797400000015.
  - in Tucker, Kenneth A. Business History: Selected Readings, Routledge, 1977.
- Wilson, A. S. The Consett Iron Company Limited: a case study in Victorian business history, PhD thesis, Durham University, 1973.
