= Rowley railway station (England) =

Disused railway station in Rowley and Castleside, County Durham

Rowley
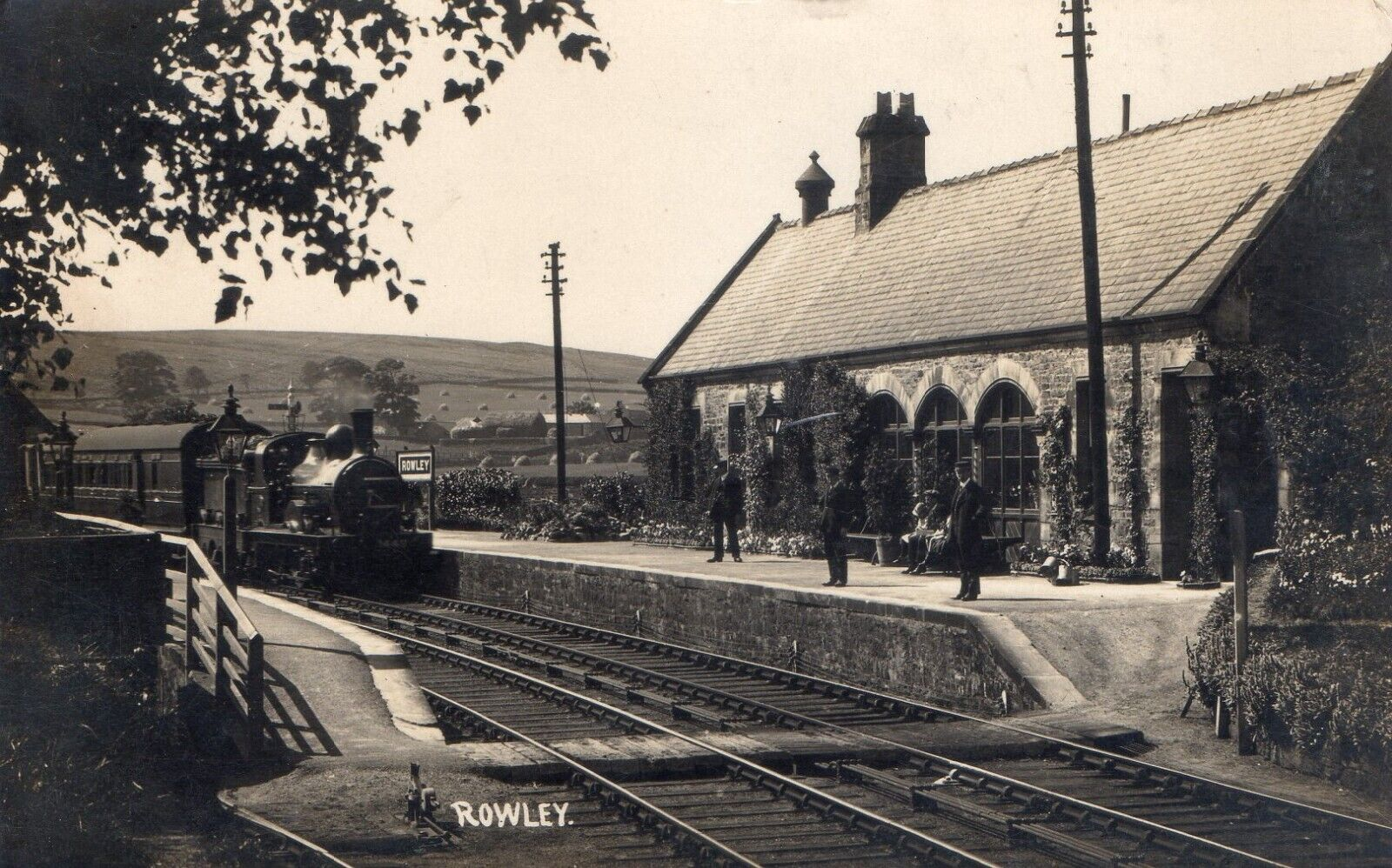

General information
- Location: Rowley, County Durham; England
- Coordinates: 54.8259°N 1.866°W
- Grid reference: NZ087479
- Platforms: 2

Other information
- Status: Disused

History
- Original company: Stockton and Darlington Railway
- Pre-grouping: North Eastern Railway
- Post-grouping: LNER

Key dates
- 1 September 1845: Opened as Cold Rowley
- 1 July 1868: Renamed Rowley
- 1 May 1939: Closed to passengers
- 6 June 1966: Closed completely
- 1972: Dismantled
- 1976: Reopened at Beamish Museum
Location

Rowley railway station served the hamlet of Rowley and the village of Castleside in County Durham, England from 1845 to 1966 on the Stanhope & Tyne Railway.

== History ==
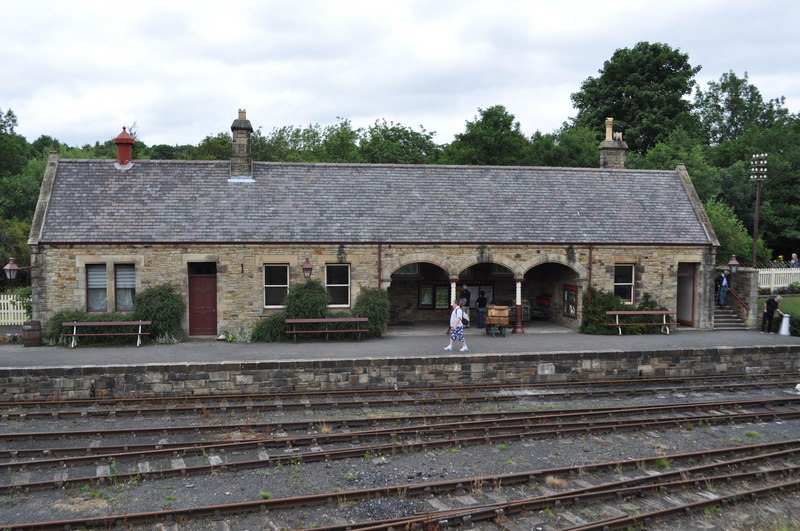
Rowley's original station buildings in 2011, seen following their translocation to Beamish Museum.

The station was opened on 1 September 1845 as Cold Rowley as a stop on the Derwent Railway route from Consett to Crook but was renamed Rowley on 1 July 1868. It was situated on the west side of the A68 on what is now the Waskerley Way cycle track which passes through the station site. The goods traffic that was handled at the station was ganister (stone) and livestock. By 1931, passenger numbers had declined to 2,548 and to 753 in 1938, which led to its inevitable passenger closure on 1 May 1939. The station was still open to goods traffic with a single track in the 1950s until it closed completely on 6 June 1966. The line through the station continued to carry mineral traffic until 1 May 1969 and was then dismantled in 1970.

By the 1970s, the station buildings had fallen into disrepair however in 1972 the station buildings were dismantled for reassembly at the North of England Open Air Museum at Beamish. The relocated Rowley station was opened to public as a museum exhibit in 1976 and is presented as a North Eastern Railway station during the Edwardian period.

Preceding station	Historical railways	Following station
Burnhill; Line and station closed	North Eastern Railway; Derwent Railway	Blackhill; Line and station closed
Burnhill; Line and station closed	North Eastern Railway; Derwent Railway	Consett; Line and station closed
