= Carrhouse railway station =

Short-lived railway station in County Durham, England

Carrhouse

General information
- Location: Carrhouse, County Durham; England
- Coordinates: 54.858998°N 1.812806°W
- Platforms: 2

Other information
- Status: Disused

History
- Original company: North Eastern Railway
- Pre-grouping: North Eastern Railway

Key dates
- 1 July 1858: Opened
- 1 October 1868: Closed
Location

Carrhouse railway station, also known as Carr House railway station, served the area of Carrhouse, County Durham, England, from 1858 to 1868 on the Stanhope and Tyne Railway.

== History ==
The station opened on 1 July 1858 by the North Eastern Railway. It was a short-lived station, closing 10 years later on 1 October 1868.

Preceding station	Disused railways	Following station
Leadgate; Line and station closed	Stanhope and Tyne Railway	Consett (1862-1867); Line and station closed
