= Annfield Plain railway station =

Disused railway station in County Durham, England

Coordinates: 54.856°N 1.737°W

Annfield Plain
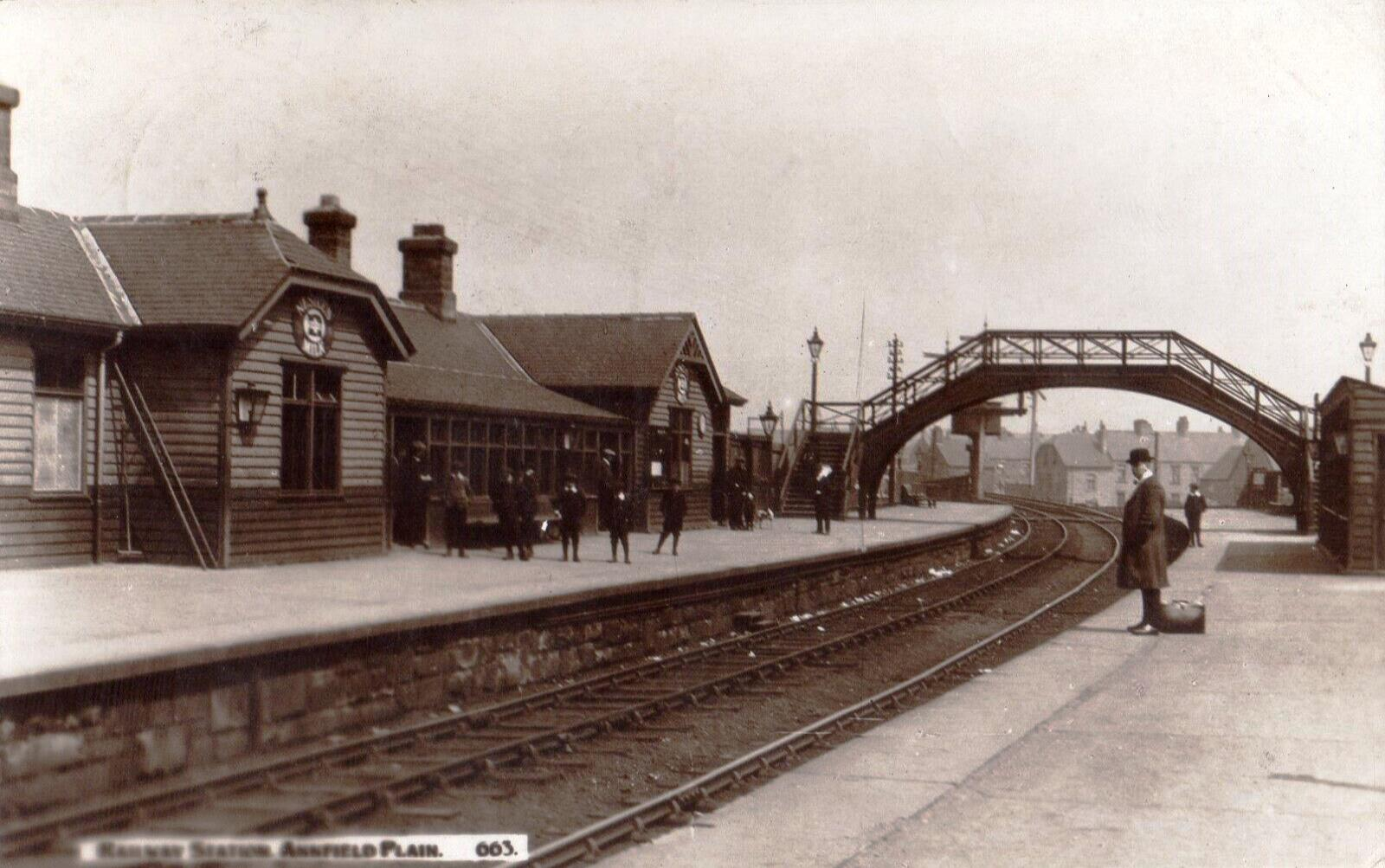

General information
- Location: Annfield Plain, County Durham; England
- Grid reference: NZ169512
- Platforms: 2

Other information
- Status: Disused

History
- Original company: North Eastern Railway
- Pre-grouping: North Eastern Railway
- Post-grouping: London and North Eastern Railway

Key dates
- 1 February 1894: Station opens
- 23 May 1955: Station closes
Location

Annfield Plain railway station was in County Durham in Northern England, on the original south section of the industrial Stanhope and Tyne Railway, which diverged from the East Coast Main Line south of Newcastle.

== History ==
The station was opened by the North Eastern Railway, and it became part of the London and North Eastern Railway during the Grouping of 1923. The station then passed on to the Eastern Region of British Railways on nationalisation in 1948.

The station was closed by British Railways on 23 May 1955.

Preceding station	Disused railways	Following station
Leadgate; Line and station closed	London and North Eastern Railway; North Eastern Railway	West Stanley; Line and station closed

== The site today ==
The station has since been demolished and replaced by a supermarket. Nothing remains of the station.
