= Waskerley railway station =

Short-lived railway station in Waskerley, County Durham

Waskerley
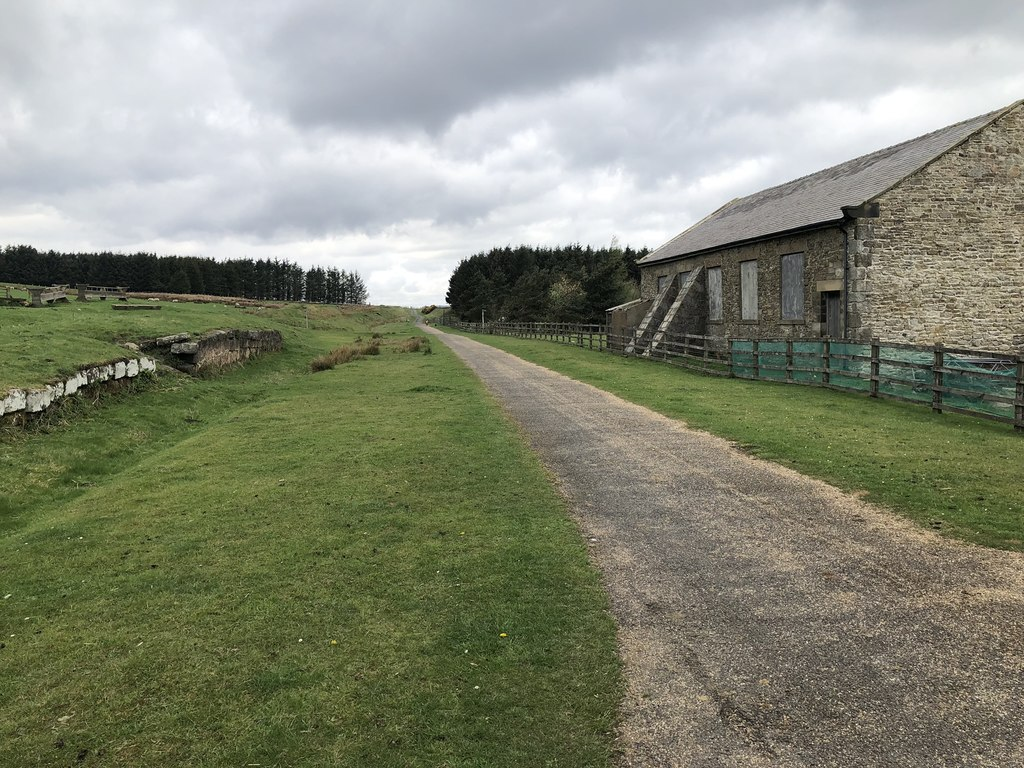
- The site of the station in 2019

General information
- Location: Waskerley, County Durham; England
- Coordinates: 54.8023°N 1.9184°W
- Grid reference: NZ053452
- Platforms: 2

Other information
- Status: Disused

History
- Original company: Stockton and Darlington Railway
- Pre-grouping: North Eastern Railway (United Kingdom)

Key dates
- 1 September 1845: Opened
- 4 July 1859: Closed to passengers
- 2 August 1965: Closed completely
Location

Waskerley railway station, also known as Waskerley Park, served the village of Waskerley, County Durham, England from 1845 to 1859 on the Stanhope and Tyne Railway.

== History ==
The station opened on 1 September 1845 by the Stockton and Darlington Railway. It was situated on Waskerley Way on the south side of an unnamed loop road running between railway cottages and a farm in Waskerley. The station was short lived; closing 14 years after opening on 4 July 1859, although unadvertised express occasionally ran between 1880 and 1921. The station and line were still open to goods traffic, primarily lime and stone, but this was discontinued due to competition of road traffic and the station was closed to goods traffic on 2 August 1965.

Preceding station	Historical railways	Following station
Park Head; Line and station closed	North Eastern Railway; Weardale Extension Railway (Stanhope Branch) & (Consett Branch)	Saltersgate Cottage; Line and station closed
Rowley; Line and station closed	North Eastern Railway; Weardale Extension Railway (Stanhope Branch) & (Consett Branch)	Saltersgate Cottage; Line and station closed
