= Waskerley =

Village in County Durham, England

Coordinates: 54°48′N 1°55′W

Smiddy Shaw Reservoir, near Waskerley and the Sea to Sea Cycle Route, on barren Waskeley Moor, County Durham looking northeast towards Consett. The Moorcock pub is near the east end of the reservoir.

Waskerley is a village in County Durham, England. It is situated six miles to the southwest of Consett and three miles southwest of Castleside and the A68. Stanhope in the Durham Dales is a further six miles to the southwest and the Derwent Reservoir and the village of Edmundbyers is approximately five miles to the north. The village of Muggleswick is three miles to the north.

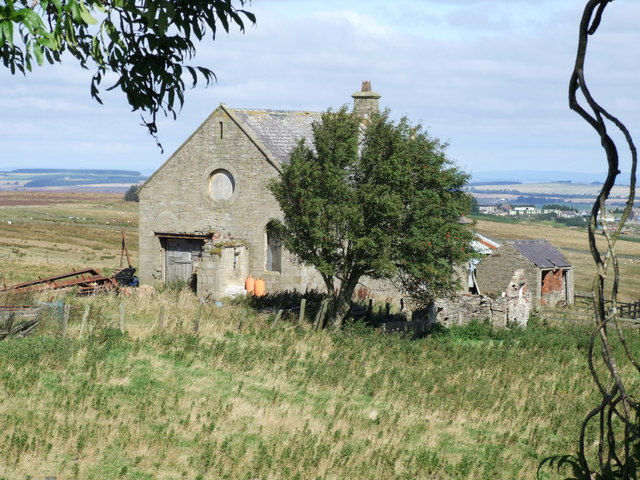
The disused "Primitive Methodist Church" at Waskerley. Now used for agricultural purposes.

In 1283 under a license the land was enclosed around Stanhope and Waskerley Head.

The Stanhope & Tyne Railway line opened in 1834 transporting limestone from the quarries above Stanhope. However, the line was bankrupt by 1840 and the Derwent Iron Company took over the route to ensure a supply of limestone to the iron works at Consett. The line reopened in 1845 and the small railway village developed. There were two engine sheds, a station master’s house, two rows of housing, a school, and a Methodist chapel (now used as a barn). With the decline in railway haulage and passengers the line finally closed in 1969 and much of the village was abandoned.

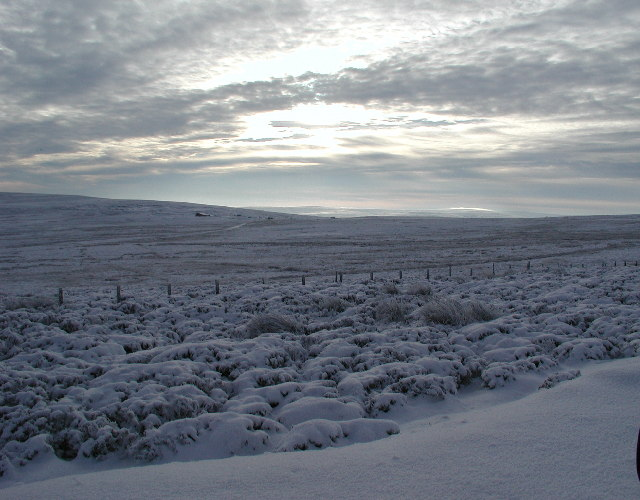
Winter sunshine over Waskerley Way and Waskerley Moor.

The Anglican church of St Matthew’s was built in 1896 and is still lit by gas lighting.

Waskerley sits on top of Waskerley Moor, straddling a road between Castleside and Stanhope. The Sea to Sea Cycle Route passes close by to the north – the section crossing Waskerley Moor was formerly known as the Waskerley Way. The main landmark was the Moorcock pub, used by local farmers and users of the Sea to Sea Cycle Route. This pub closed some years ago, and is now a private house.

Waskerley, Smiddy Shaw (photographed) and Hishope Reservoirs are situated on Waskerley Moor near Waskerley.
