= Fenwick Lawson =

English sculptor (1932–2026)

- Statue of St Cuthbert by Fenwick Lawson, Lindisfarne Priory
- Born: Fenwick Justin John Lawson; 19 May 1932; South Moor, County Durham, England
- Died: 23 January 2026 (aged 93); Chester-le-Street, County Durham, England
- Citizenship: British
- Education: Sunderland College of Art (1951–54) and Royal College of Art, London (1954–57)
- Known for: Sculpture

Fenwick Justin John Lawson, ARCA (19 May 1932 – 23 January 2026) was an English sculptor based in the north-east of England.

== Life and career ==
Fenwick Lawson was born on 19 May 1932 in South Moor, County Durham, into a coal mining family, He spent his childhood in the neighbouring pit villages of The Middles and Craghead, and attended Stanley Grammar School. After leaving school he joined Durham County Council as a pupil architect.

He studied at the Sunderland College of Art (1951–54) and Royal College of Art, London (1954–57), under John Skeaping and under the influence of Jacob Epstein (then in the college working on the Llandaff Christ). In 1958 and 1959, having been awarded the Sir James Knott Travelling Scholarship, he completed his studies by travel in France, Italy and Greece, being influenced by the sculptural masters such as Michelangelo and Donatello and by the simplicity of form in Cycladic art.

In 1961, he was appointed lecturer in sculpture at Newcastle-upon-Tyne College of Art and when this merged into Newcastle-upon-Tyne Polytechnic in 1970, he became a principal Lecturer and head of sculpture before retiring from teaching in 1984.

Lawson was a member of various bodies, such as the Art and Architects Department of the Bishops' Conference of England and Wales (1972–77), the Fabrics Advisory Committee of Newcastle Cathedral (1991–94), and the Advisory Committee for Historic Churches in the Diocese of Hexham and Newcastle (1995–2000). He was also visiting lecturer at the Duncan of Jordanstone College of Art, Dundee, Scotland (1987) and at the Royal Academy in London (1987–89). Lawson was an honorary member of the Northumbria Branch of the Royal Institute of British Architects from 1986, and was a trustee of Durham City Trust from 1979 to 1995.

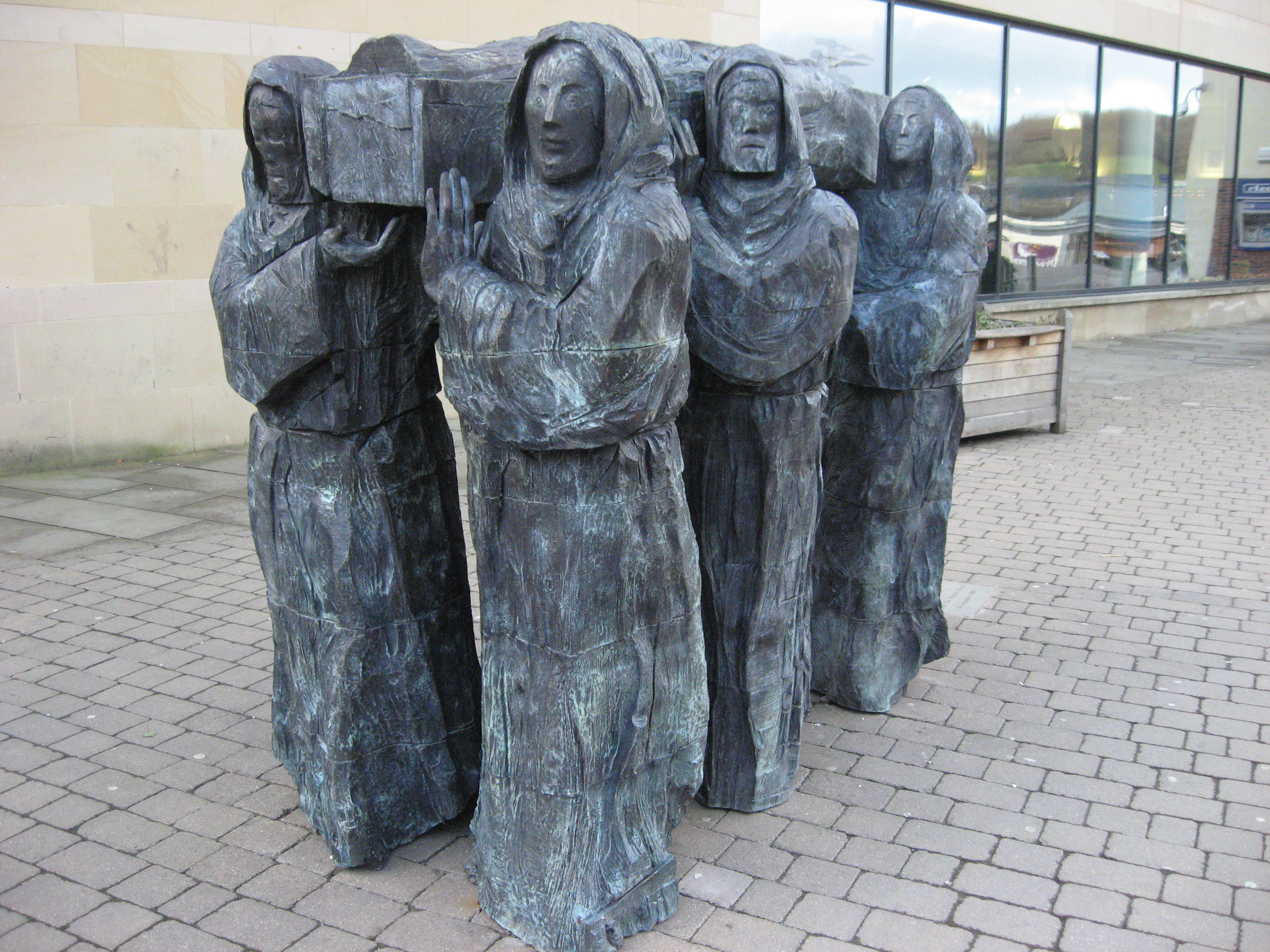
'The Journey', public sculpture in Durham City by Lawson

He was awarded an honorary Doctor of Letters from Durham University (2008). Lawson was granted the Freeman of the City of Durham on 10 November 2008. In 2024 a blue plaque was installed on his former home and studio from 1977, in Bow Lane, Durham.

== Work assessment ==
Lawson's work evolved significantly during his career. At the time of his first solo exhibition, at the Laing Art Gallery in Newcastle in 1964, he was associated with the neo-brutalist school, based on the use of scrap metal to create uncompromising and non-figurative sculptures. By the 1970s his focus moved towards more figurative wood carvings, with religious themes, notably sculptures based on the two famous saints linked to Northumbria, Bede and Cuthbert. He also created liturgical furnishings such as altars, lecterns and stations of the cross. This was most evident during an artistic and architectural partnership with his friend, the ecclesiastical architect Vincente Stienlet in the new RC churches of St Oswald, South Shields (1965), St Joseph, Wetherby (1986), St Francis of Assisi, Sheffield (1989), St Bede, Bedlington (1992), St Francis of Assisi, Hull (1997) and St Benedict, Garforth (1998).

Though his work can be found as far afield as the two sculptures at the Pontifical Beda College in Rome, it is the city of Durham that has the focus of his public artwork. This includes The Pieta, Cuthbert of Farne, Gaia, Jacob and the Angel, Cry for Justice, The Hostage, and The Wheel Cross. The Journey, paid by public subscription, was unveiled by The Princess Royal on 26 September 2008. Located in Millennnium Square, in front of the Gala Theatre in Durham's city centre, it shows six monks carrying the coffin of St. Cuthbert, and the Lindisfarne Gospels, to protect them from raids by the Vikings. The eventual resting place in 995 eventually became Durham Cathedral, so this sculpture commemorates the foundation of the city.

== Personal life and death ==
Fenwick Lawson had four children and was married to his wife Joan for 74 years. Lawson died at a hospital in Chester-le-Street on 23 January 2026, at the age of 93.

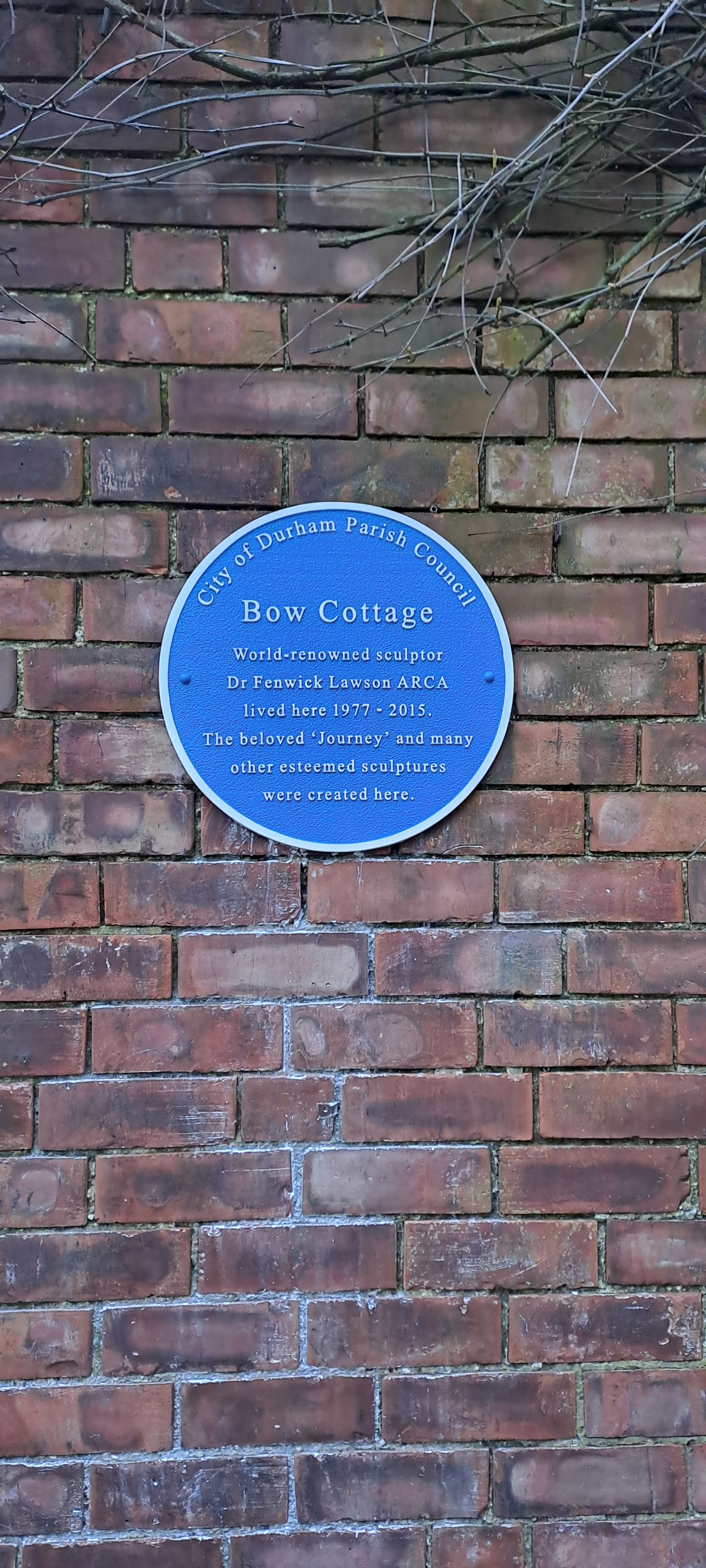
Blue plaque commemorating sculptor Fenwick Lawson

== Some of Fenwick's work ==
Name, date, and current location.

- Coventry Christ, 1955–1956, St Peter's, Jarrow
- St Michael and the Devil, 1956, St Paul's, Jarrow
- Interaction, 1962, Laing Art Gallery, Newcastle-upon-Tyne
- Holy Family, 1967, Church of the Holy Family, Grindon, Sunderland, Tyne and Wear
- The Risen Christ, 1968, St Paul's, Jarrow
- St Bede, 1970, St Bede's, Washington, Tyne and Wear
- Risen Christ, 1977, RC Chaplaincy, Newcastle University
- Venerable Bede, 1973, St Paul's, Jarrow
- Pieta, 1974–1981, east end of Durham Cathedral since 2004 (shown at York Minster 1984 – 1996)
- Cuthbert of Farne, 1984, Durham Museum (originally shown in the cloister of Durham Cathedral from 1984 to 1996; full-size bronze cast made in 2000 is on show at Lindisfarne Abbey)
- Gaia, 1984, Durham Museum
- Risen Christ, 1974, St Michael's, Houghton-le-Spring
- Pulpit Christ, 1976, Southwick Cathedral, London
- Lord of the Dance, 1956, St Peter and Paul, Fareham, Hampshire
- Annunciation, 1977, St Mary-le-Bow, London
- Lectern with Carved Dove, 1978–79, Bill Quay Methodist Church, Pelaw, Tyne and Wear
- Processional Cross, 1981, St Pancras Parish Church, Euston Road, London
- Processional Cross, 1982, St Gregory's, South Shields, Tyne and Wear
- Risen Christ, 1982, St Gregory's, South Shields, Tyne and Wear
- Annunciation, 1982, St Gregory's, South Shields, Tyne and Wear
- Pascal Candle, 1982, St Gregory's, South Shields, Tyne and Wear
- Dove, 1982, St Gregory's, South Shields, Tyne and Wear
- Trinity, 1982, Church of the Holy Trinity, Carlisle
- Risen Christ, 1965, St Oswald's, South Shields, Tyne and Wear
- Condemned, 1984, Ushaw College, Co Durham
- Hostage, 1984, Ushaw College, Co Durham
- The Scream, 1985, Ushaw College, Co Durham
- Christ in the Tomb, 1985, (14th station of the cross, with casts of the hands of the Ascended Christ at Jarrow), 1988, east end of Durham Cathedral
- Stations of the Cross, 1986, St Joseph's, Wetherby
- Our Lady, 1986, St Joseph's, Wetherby
- Risen Christ, 1986, St Joseph's, Wetherby
- Stations of the Cross, 1986, Ecumenical Chapel, Youth Custody Centre, Castington, Northumberland
- Our Lady, 1986, Ecumenical Chapel, Youth Custody Centre, Castington, Northumberland
- Risen Christ, 1989, St Francis of Assisi, Sheffield
- Weeping Women, 1989–90, Ushaw College, Co Durham
- Celtic Spirit 2, 1990, Teikyo University, Durham City
- San Damiano Christ, 1991, Beda Pontifico Collegio, Rome
- Pascal Candle, 1991, St Anthony's, Hull
- Spiral Floor Mosaic, 1992, The Crypt, Cathedral Church of St Marie, Sheffield
- Risen Christ, 1992, The Crypt, Cathedral Church of St Marie, Sheffield
- Standing Cross, 1992, St Bede's, Bedlington, Northumberland
- Our Lady of Bedlington, 1992, St Bede's, Bedlington, Northumberland
- Christ Is the Morning Star, Stained glass window, 1992, St Bede's, Bedlington, Northumberland
- Star of David, 1992, St Bede's, Bedlington, Northumberland
- Altar, 1993, St Augustine's, Darlington, Co. Durham
- Lectern, 1993, St Augustine's, Darlington, Co. Durham
- Chair, 1993, St Augustine's, Darlington, Co. Durham
- Font, 1993, St Augustine's, Darlington, Co. Durham
- St Wilfrid, 1993, St Wilfrid's, Preston, Lancashire
- Lectern, 1995, St Cuthbert's, Durham City
- Memorial Processional Cross, 1995, St Cuthbert's, Durham City
- Stained Glass Sanctuary Screen, 1994, St Mary's, Jarrow, Tyne and Wear
- Hidden Life, 1996, St Wilfrid's, Preston, Lancashire
- Annunciation, 1997, St Francis of Assisi, Hull
- Cross, 1997, St Francis of Assisi, Hull
- St Augustin, 1997, St Augustine's, Darlington, Co. Durham
- Derry Cross, 1998, County Londonderry, Northern Ireland
- Stained Glass Screen, 1998, St Benedict's, Garforth, Yorkshire
- Cuthbert's Journey or The Journey, 1999, from 2005 at St Mary's, Lindisfarne (first shown at The Red Box, Newcastle-upon-Tyne)
- Beda Bede, 2001, Beda Pontifico Collegio, Rome
- The Wheel Cross, 2001, Gospel Garden, Lindisfarne. Also Bronze Cast thereof at St Aidan's College, Durham

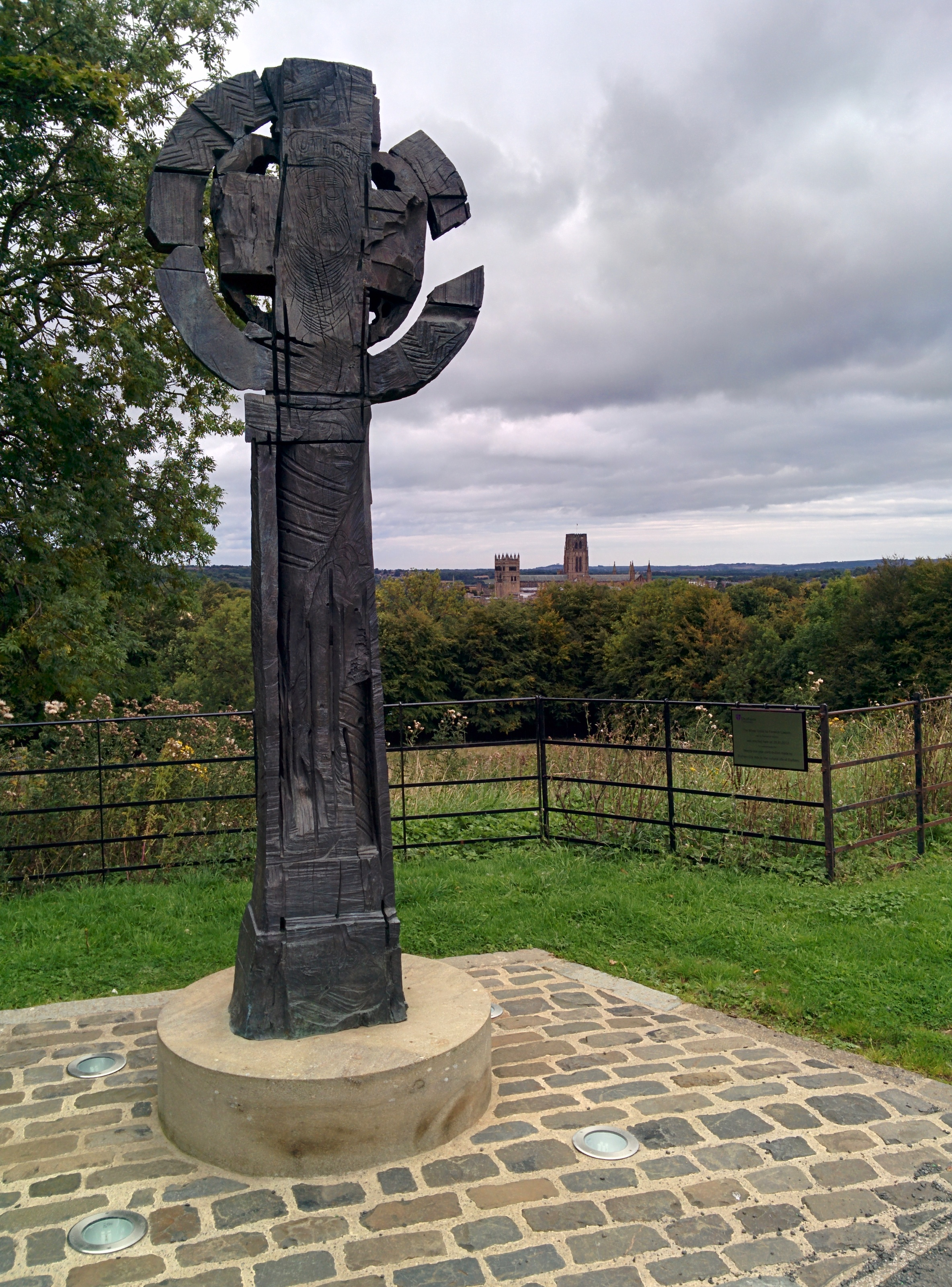
Wheel Cross by Fenwick Lawson

- Burning Bush, 2003, Family Collection
- Finial, 2005, St Luke's, Grimethorpe, Yorkshire
- Mary, 2006, St Mary's College, Durham University
- "Risen Christ", 2008 Grey College, Durham, Durham University
- "The Journey" 2008 Bronze, Millennium Square, Durham City
