= Kip Hill =

Village in County Durham, England

Coordinates: 54.88°N 1.688°W

Kip Hill is a village in County Durham, in England. It is situated directly to the north of Stanley, near Shield Row.

It has two pubs, the Blue Bell Inn and the Ball Alley* (*formerly known as the 'Shield Row Hotel'^{1}) ^{2}The 3rd Edition Ordnance Survey map of 1921

The area was once known as Kiphill but sometime between 1895 and 1898 this changed to the current Kip Hill.

Kip Hill is a Mile from the Causey Arch and Causey Burn.
