= Causey =

Causey may refer to:

== Places ==
- Causey, County Durham, a village in England
- Causey Mounth, an ancient drovers' road over the coastal fringe of Aberdeenshire, Scotland
- Causey, New Mexico, a village in Roosevelt County, New Mexico, United States
- Causey Pike, a fell in the English Lake District
- Causey Reservoir, a reservoir in Utah, United States

== People ==
- Causey (surname)

== Other uses ==
- An archaic version of causeway

== See also ==
- The Causey Arch, the world's oldest surviving railway bridge, near Stanley, County Durham, England
- Causey Park Bridge, a village in Northumberland, England
  - Causey Park House, a 16th-century former manor house at Causey Park Bridge
- The Causey Way, an American punk/new wave music group from 1997 to 2001
