= Tanfield =

Tanfield may refer to:

== People ==
- Charlie Tanfield (born 1996), British racing cyclist
- Elizabeth Tanfield (1585–1635), English poet and dramatist
- Francis Tanfield (1565–?), Proprietary Governor of the South Falkland colony in Newfoundland
- Lawrence Tanfield (c. 1551–1625), English lawyer and politician
- Peter Tanfield (born 1961), British violinist

== Places ==
- Tanfield, County Durham, a village in County Durham, England
- East Tanfield, a civil parish in North Yorkshire, England
- West Tanfield, a village in North Yorkshire, England

== Other ==
- Tanfield Group, a manufacturer of electric trucks and work platforms based in the United Kingdom
- Tanfield Railway, a tourist attraction in County Durham, England
- Tanfield School, County Durham, England
- Tanfield Valley, archaeological site on Baffin Island
