= Tommy Armstrong (singer-songwriter) =

English poet, singer-songwriter and entertainer

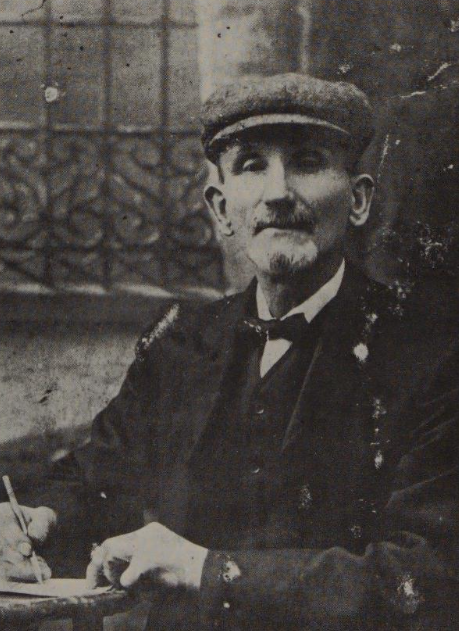
- This photo was used as the frontispiece in a book of his songs.

Background information
- Born: Thomas Armstrong; 15 August 1848; Shotley Bridge, County Durham, England
- Died: 30 August 1920 (aged 72) Tantobie, County Durham, England
- Genres: Music hall; folk song; broadside ballad
- Occupations: Singer-songwriter, entertainer, writer, poet, newsagent, miner
- Years active: 1864 – c. 1913
- Spouses: Mary Hunter (m. 1869-1898); Ann Thompson (m. 1901)
- Children: 14

Thomas Armstrong (1848–1920), known as Tommy Armstrong, was an English poet, singer-songwriter and entertainer dubbed "The Pitman Poet" and "The Bard of the Northern Coalfield". Writing largely in the Geordie and Pitmatic dialects, he was renowned for his ability to chronicle the lives of the mining communities in and around Stanley in County Durham and to commemorate mining disasters.

== Early life ==
Tommy Armstrong was born at 17 Wood Street in Shotley Bridge on 15 August 1848. His father, Timothy Armstrong, a miner originally from Hamsterley, and his mother, Mary (née Wilson), from Wigton, had married in Easington in 1842. Tommy was the second of five children.

Where and at what age he first worked down a mine is unclear, with varying statements in the local press (Medomsley Colliery, aged eight) and by his eldest son (East Tanfield Colliery, aged nine). Official records (Note: Tilly (2010) cites Durham Record Office reference NCB 1/SC 109/14–19.) show him employed at Addison Colliery in 1866, first as a putter (Note: A putter supplied the hewer with empty tubs in which to place the hewn coal and then conveyed the filled tubs, by pulling and putting [thrusting], to the bottom of the mineshaft for hoisting to the surface.), and then as a hewer. According to his younger brother, he then worked at East Tanfield Colliery from late 1866 for several years. The 1901 Census shows him as a "Coal Worker Underground", and later records refer to him as a miner or coal-miner. His death certificate records him as a "Retired Colliery Shifter".

== Later life ==
In 1869, on Christmas Day, Tommy Armstrong married Mary Ann Hunter, who was 16, at Gateshead Register Office. They had 14 children: eight died young. Mary died in 1898, and in 1901, Armstrong married Ann Thompson, a widow, at Tanfield Parish Church.

He lived for the most part in Tanfield Lea, though from 1902, for a few years, he moved to Whitley Bay to start and run a business as a newsagent. In 1906, he had an address in Ouston. In 1911, he was living with his widowed eldest child, Mary, and her children in Tanfield Lea; his second wife resided in Chester-le-Street with another daughter from his first marriage.

He died on 30 August 1920, aged 72, in Tantobie, and is buried in the churchyard of Tanfield Parish Church.

== Style ==
Songs in domestic settings predominate in Armstrong's repertoire. He also wrote many concerning the life, work and struggles of miners in the pits, and several disaster ballads. The sociologist Huw Beynon states that what makes Armstrong stand out from other coalfield songwriters is his "impish irreverence" and "imaginative devilishness", with "nothing cloying or sentimental" in his descriptions of mining life, while the folklorist A. L. Lloyd, according to Beynon, thought Armstrong wrote "as a herald of the dawn, who welcomes the day with a cock crow". The folklorist Roy Palmer noted the playfulness, sympathy, and humour in his works. As Armstrong himself put it:

When ye're the Pitmen's Poet, an' looked up to for it, wey, if a disaster or a strike or a murder goes by wi'oot a sang fre ye, they say: "What’s the matter wi' Tommy Armstrong? Has someone druv a spigot in him an' let oot a' the inspiration?" Me aad sangs hev kept me in beer, an' the floor o' the public bar hes bin me stage for forty years. Aw'd sing, we'd drink, aw'd sing, we'd drink agen, sangs wi'oot end, amen.

Folk-songs and the musical forms associated with music hall performances both influenced Armstrong's compositions. The stage was most strongly reflected in the lyrics, and the folk-song influence most clearly evident in the melodies he directed his songs be sung to – he rarely wrote his own tunes, and in most cases made up the words with an existing one in mind: many were urbanised versions of folk melodies. In particular, Armstrong loved and was influenced by the Irish ballads that were popular amongst coal-miners in the second half of the nineteenth century, especially the genre dubbed "Come-all-ye": (Note: From the traditional opening phrase of such songs.) these were usually written in lines of 14 syllables, with tunes in 6/8 time, and often in the Dorian or Mixolydian mode.

=== Examples of compositions ===
==== Domestic songs ====
It wes in Novimber an' aw nivor will fergit,
The polis an' the candymen at Oakey's hooses met.
Johnny the bellmin he wes theor, squintin roond aboot,
An' he pleaced three min at iv'ry door te torn the pitmin oot.

What wid aw de, if aw'd the poower mesel'?
Aw'd hang the twinty candymen an' Johnny that carries the bell!

— Tommy Armstrong (1885), The Oakey Strike evictions (first verse and chorus)

Armstrong directed that this be sung to the tune of The Pride of Petticoat Lane. The version below was collected and transcribed by A. L. Lloyd in Tanfield in August 1951.

==== Workplace songs ====
One mornin' whin aw wint te wark, the sight wes most excitin',
Aw heard a noise an' looked aroond an' whe d'ye think wes fightin'?
Aw stud amazed an' at 'em gazed te see 'em in such rages,
But aw nivor heard a row like that between the Brockwill cages!
Wor aad cage says: "Come ower the gates,
Because it's my intention
To let thee see whether thoo or me
Is the best invention."
The new'un bein raised, took off his claes,
Then at it they went dabbin'
The blood wes runnin' doon the skeets
An' past the weighman's cabin ...

— Tommy Armstrong (1908), Th' Row Between Th' Cages (introduction and first verse)

Armstrong directed that this be sung to the tune of Robin Tamson's Smiddy, a ballad written by Alexander Rodger. The version of the first verse below was collected and transcribed by A. L. Lloyd in Tanfield in August 1951.

==== Disaster ballads ====
Men and boys left home that morning
For to earn their daily bread.
Little thought before the evening
They’d be numbered with the dead;
Let us think of Mrs. Burnett,
Once had sons and now has none –
With the Trimdon Grange explosion,
Joseph, George and James have gone.

— Tommy Armstrong (1882), The Trimdon Grange Explosion (second verse)

Armstrong wrote this song to the tune of the parlour-song Go and Leave Me If You Wish It, and sang it, within days of the disaster, at the local Mechanics' Hall. A. L. Lloyd collected and transcribed a version of the first verse below, noting "As sung (one verse only) by R. Sewell of Newcastle (June 1951)".

According to Vicinus (1974), The Trimdon Grange Explosion exemplifies the later style of nineteenth-century pit disaster poem, with the traditional tone of lament accompanied by elements of reportage.

=== Patter ===
Some of Armstrong's works incorporate patter – "passages of prose ... to be spoken in between the verses and chorus, both of which are meant to be sung." An example is Th' Borth E Th' Lad, one of his first poems:

Aa can mind that mornin aa was born as if it was the neet. Th' pits was aal idle the next day – because it was Sunda; but ye wadn't thowt it was Sunda' in wor hoose. There was that much tea an' ginger-beer drunken, aa was forced to stop the tap. Dolly Potts got tite an' flung a saucer at Betty Green, but it missed hor an' catched me reet between the eyes an' the mooth, an' aa've ad a greet lump there iver since. But we seun maid hor an ootside passenger, an' we enjoyed worselves wi singen –

He's the best of ony,
His fyace it is se bonny;
We'll caal 'im Tommy;
He's the picture of his dad;
So they popped on the kettle,
As seun as things was settled,
Then the tea was fettled
Ower the birth of the lad.

— Tommy Armstrong (1864), Th' Borth E Th' Lad (introductory patter and chorus)

A version of Th' Borth E Th' Lad was recorded by Bert Draycott, a miner, in the 1970s.

Armstrong wrote one song, Th' Skeul Bord Man, in the form of a short play featuring the voices of a father, mother, son, and an inspector from the son's school:

One mornin it haulf-past hite, aw sade te maw bit bairn
"On we thee clais, en get off te skeul, for thoo naws thit aw want th' te lairn."
Boy: Th' skeul gans in it nine, en ye naws it's not vary far.
Man: Thoo naws aw like for te see th' be in time, so thee beuk en thee slate's e th' drawer.

spoken Man: Get off te skeul is sharp is ivor thoo can.
Boy: Aw can't gan this mornin.
Man: Thoo canna gan this mornin!! Wat's th' matter we th'?
Boy: Aw heh th' tic.
Man: Thor's alwis somethen th' matter we th' wen thoo has te gan te skeul. If thoo dissent gan aw'll be getten e lump of paipor, en it th' boddom there'll be ritten on –

Send yer bairns te skeul,
Learn them aa ye can.
Make scholarship yor faithful friend,
An' ye'll nivor see th' skeul-bord man.

— Tommy Armstrong (c. 1900), Th' Skeul Bord Man (introduction, first dialogue, and chorus)

== Publications ==
A broadsheet of The Consett Choir Calamity (Note: On 26 August 1911, ten members of the Consett Co-operative Contest Choir were killed and 19 seriously injured when the charabanc taking them to perform at a flower show crashed.) published by Alex McKinlay (West Stanley, 1911). 19 x 25 cm

Armstrong's compositions were initially published as one-penny broadsheets, the most widespread form of literature consumed by the working class at the time.

Subsequently, the Song Book, a collection of 25 songs compiled by his son William, was produced in three editions: the first appeared during Armstrong's lifetime (1909, priced at three pence), the second, a decade after his death (1930, three pence), and the third in 1953 (one shilling). Several of these songs (Note: The Trimdon Grange Explosion, Oakey's Keeker, The Sooth Medomsley Strike, The Durham Lock-out, The Oakey Strike Evictions, The Sheel Raw Flud, Dorham Jail, and Th' Row Between Th' Cages. In the preface, Lloyd thanks William Armstrong "for generously allowing me to use a number of ballads written by his father, Thomas Armstrong, 'the Tanfield Colliery Poet'."), together with the tunes Armstrong had set them to, were anthologised in Lloyd's 1952 compilation of coalfield songs and ballads, Come All Ye Bold Miners, and in his 1967 study of Folk Song in England. (Note: The Trimdon Grange Explosion, The Oakey Strike Evictions, The Durham Lock-out, and Th' Row Between Th' Cages.)

Tommy Armstrong Sings, a facsimile of the Song Book with added line illustrations, appeared in 1971: this was produced by a local publisher during a surge of interest in printed versions of Tyneside songs and tunes in the wake of the second British folk revival. A Complete Works containing 29 songs (many with tunes) followed in 1987, published by the Tommy Armstrong Memorial Trust. (Note: With the support of Northern Arts, a then-regional arm of Arts Council England.) In the preface, the Trust stated it had been founded (in 1986) "with the aim of restoring the Tanfield Pitman's Poet to his rightful place in the history and culture of the North East", and declared that Armstrong's output "reflects the hardship and humour of West Durham mining life during the last century and the early part of this one."

In 2010, a grandson of Armstrong published a biography containing 30 previously published works and a further 16 printed in local newspapers. A sequel in 2011 contained several additional works, including a poem, first sold as a broadsheet, commemorating the 1909 West Stanley Pit Disaster.

== Recordings ==
From 1962 onwards, "The Trimdon Grange Explosion" was recorded by many artists in studio albums and compilations, including the 1993 version of The Iron Muse.

In 1965, Topic Records released Tommy Armstrong Of Tyneside, (Note: The original title planned, reportedly Tommy Armstrong of Tanfield, was changed on the advice of A. L. Lloyd "to ensure the right target audience – by suggesting to potential buyers that this was industrial rather than rural song, and in the music-hall rather than the oral tradition.") an LP with 14 of his songs, with an insert containing a biography and notes by A. L. Lloyd. A CD version was released in 1997. Reviewing the original release, The Gramophone's critic considered the album "beautifully done, with gusto, understanding and musical ability" and "a well recorded, well documented selection of songs" with "some excellent singing by Johnny Handle, Louis Killen and Maureen Craik."

No recordings of Armstrong himself are known.

== Memorials ==
Stanley Town Council unveiled a plaque commemorating Tommy Armstrong at Tanfield Church on 11 June 2016. Part of the ceremony was held next to Tommy Armstrong's two memorial headstones: the original, and one dedicated in 1986.

== Selected songs ==
- The Blanchland Murder (Note: Robert Snowball, who ran a farm near Blanchland, was murdered on or around New Year's Day, 1880.)
- Bobby En Bet
- Th' Borth E Th' Lad
  [The Birth of the Lad]
- The Cat Pie
- The Consett Choir Calamity
- Corry's Rat
- Dorham Jail
  (or, Durham Gaol)
- The Durham Lock-out (Note: The Durham lock-out of 1892 preceded the 1893 miners' strike, a major industrial action affecting many areas of the UK.)
- Funny Nuaims It Tanfeeld Pit
  [Funny Names at Tanfield Pit]
- Gateshead Poor Children's Trip To Stanley
- Geordie Broon
- The Ghost Thit' Anted Bunty
  [The Ghost that Haunted Bunty]
- The Hedgehog Pie
- Jack Reckonen
  [Jack's Reckoning]
- The Kaiser And The War
- Kelloe Disaster
- Marla Hill Ducks
  (or, Marley Hill Ducks)
- Murder of Mary Donnelly
- Neglectful Sally
- Th' Nue Ralewae Te Anfeeld Plane
  [The New Railway to Annfield Plain]
- Oakey's Keeker
- The Oakey Strike Evictions
  (or, Oakey Strike)
- Old Dolly Cook and Her Family
- Old Folk's Tea at West Stanley
- The Old Men's Trip
- The Picture Hall at Tantobie
- A Poam To The Kaiser
- The Prudent Pitman
- Th' Row Between Th' Cages
  (or, The Row 'Atween the Cages)
- Th' Row I' Th' Guuttor
- A Sewing Meeting
- The Sheel Raw Flud
- Th' Skeul Bord Man
  [The School Board Man]
- The Sooth Medomsley Strike
  [The South Medomsley Strike]
- Stanla Markit
  [Stanley Market]
- The Summer Flies
- Tanfeeld Lee Silvor Modil Band
  [The Tanfield Lea Silver Model Band]
- Tanfield Braike
- Tantobie Wednesday Football Team
- Tantobie Workmen's Club Oxo Banquet
- Tommy The Poet Signed On
- The Trimdon Grange Explosion
  (or, The Trimdon Grange Disaster) (Note: On 16 February 1882, an explosion at the Trimdon Grange colliery caused the deaths of 69 men and boys.)
- The Trip From Tantobie Union Club to Jarrow Excelsior Club
- The Unhappy Couple
- Th' Wheelbarrow Man
- Wor Nanny's a mazer (Note: Or mazor, maisor, or maizor.)

== See also ==
- English language in Northern England
- Geordie dialect words – Northern English dialect and demonym native to Tyneside
- music hall – Type of British theatrical entertainment popular between 1850 and 1960
- Pitmatic – Dialects spoken in former mining areas of Northumberland and Durham
