= White-le-Head =

Village in County Durham, England

Coordinates: 54.884°N 1.731°W

- Location within County Durham
- OS grid reference: NZ173543
- Unitary authority: County Durham
- Ceremonial county: County Durham
- Region: North East
- Country: England
- Sovereign state: United Kingdom
- Post town: STANLEY
- Postcode district: DH9
- Police: Durham
- Fire: County Durham and Darlington
- Ambulance: North East

White-le-Head is a village in County Durham, in England, situated in close proximity to the village of Tantobie. It is located on the opposite side of the Tanfield valley to Stanley. The village housed miners working at the Tanfield Moor Colliery (1768–1948).

== History ==
Like many villages in the Durham Coalfield, White-le-head had an associated colliery: the Tanfield Moor Colliery (Willy Pit). The Colliery was opened in 1768 by the Earl of Kerry; it was taken over in the 1850s by James Joicey and run by associated companies until 1947 when it was nationalised under the National Coal Board; it closed in 1948. From 1894 it produced coke and gas as well as coal.

Coal was transported via the Brandling Junction Railway using a gravity incline with 1:9 gradient from the colliery towards the Tanfield Lea colliery. The Brandling Junction Railway was taken over by the Newcastle and Darlington Junction Railway in 1844 which, on 3 August 1846 changed its name to the York & Newcastle Railway which, in turn, became part of the North Eastern Railway company in 1854. There was also the Harelaw waggonway connecting to Annfield Plain which, in 1835, became a branch of the Stanhope and Tyne Railway.

White-le-head is called Whiteley Head on the Ordnance Survey 6 inch map of 1888–1913 and in Whellan's Durham directory of 1856. It is called Whit-le-Head in the Kelly's Durham directory of 1894 and 1910.
