= Shield Row =

Coordinates: 54°52′40″N 1°42′19″W

- Village
- OS grid reference: NZ202537
- Civil parish: Stanley
- Region: North East
- Postcode district: DH9
- UK Parliament: North Durham

Shield Row is a village in County Durham, England, which forms part of the town of Stanley. The village is located to the North of Stanley Town Centre and to the East of Tanfield Lea.

== History ==
Shield Row's history is dominated by the nearby coal mines around Stanley, with several mines being located around Shield Row. Much of the area's history revolves around its role as a coal mining community. The village previously contained a rail line and railway station, originally named Shield Row, with the rail line now a cycle and walking route, and a housing estate now sitting at the site of the train station.

Shield Row contains a street named Rodham Terrace, name after a prominent local figure whose descendant is American politician Hillary Clinton.

== Location ==
Shield Row is situated on the northern side of the town of Stanley, an approximately 15 minutes walk from the town centre. Shield Row links to the Causey Road which is a main transport route from Stanley heading north towards Gateshead and Newcastle. It also connects to the A693 road heading east towards Chester-Le-Street and connecting to the A1 motorway.

The sustrans coast to coast (C2C) cycle route runs through the village, crossing the roads by two green bridges, notable landmarks in the village. This cycle route was historically a railway line connecting the port in Sunderland to the coalfields of North Durham and the steelworks in Consett, and now forms part of a coast to coast route across Northern England from Sunderland to Whitehaven.

Shield Row is located close to Beamish Museum which is accessible by the C2C route or the A693. The historic manor house of Beamish Hall is also located nearby, along with Tanfield Railway and Causey Arch, a nature area with a historic bridge.

== Food and Drink ==
Shield Row contains several pubs including The Ball Alley and The Board Inn which are primarily drinking venues, along with The Blue Bell and South Causey Inn which also serve food. The South Causey Inn is a popular local events venue and includes a hotel. Shield Row is also served by The Hilltop pub in nearby East Stanley. Shield Row Chippy is a local fish and chip shop which provides takeaway food.

== Education ==
The village contains one primary school, Shield Row School, and is served by the secondary schools of Tanfield School and North Durham Academy in other parts of the town of Stanley, along with St Bede's School, a Catholic school in Lanchester.
