= West Stanley Pit disasters =

1882 and 1909 English coal mine explosions

West Stanley Pit
- Location within County Durham
- Location: West Stanley, County Durham, United Kingdom; 54.872°N 1.684°WNZ203530
- Products: Coal
- Type: deep mine
- Greatest depth: 163 fathoms
1882 disaster
- Date: 19 April 1882
- Time: 01:00
- Cause: unsafe lamps ignited sudden inrush of firedamp
- Deaths: 13
- Inquest: 26 and 27 April 1882
- Coroner: John Graham
1909 disaster
- Date: 16 February 1909
- Time: 15:4
- Cause: unclear
- Deaths: 168
- Inquest: 18 February – 29 March
- Coroner: John Graham

The West Stanley Pit disasters refers to two explosions in 1882 and 1909 at the West Stanley colliery (also known as West Stanley pit or Burns pit), a coal mine near Stanley in County Durham, England. The mine opened in 1832 and closed in 1936. Several seams were worked over the years through four shafts: Kettledrum pit, Lamp pit, Mary pit and New pit. The 1882 explosion killed 13 men, while the 1909 explosion killed 168 men; 29 men survived the latter.

== Colliery ==
The colliery (Note: In British mining parlance a colliery is a single coal mine which is served by two or more pits or shafts.) extended over an area of 70 acres (28 ha). A number of seams existed, some of which were too thin to be economically viable.

The seams worked in 1876 and 1909 were: Shield Row (6'11" at 39 fathoms), (Note: Seam thicknesses are given in feet (') and inches (") and depths in fathoms in the original reports. There are just over 3 feet to a metre and just under 2 metres to a fathom of 6 feet.) Five Quarter (4'0" at 52½ fathoms), Brass Thill (5'0" at 62 fathoms), Low Main (4'6" at 93 fathoms), Hutton (3'9" at 97 fathoms), Towneley (4'5" at 123 fathoms), Busty (10'1" at 139 fathoms) and Brockwell (2'0" at 163 fathoms).

Two of the pits, Busty pit (also known as the New pit) and the Lamp shaft, were sunk the full distance. Before 1882, they had both reached the Busty coal. Between then and 1902, they were deepened to reach the Brockwell seam. Subsequently, the Busty shaft was further deepened to reach the Victoria coal (2'1" at 170 fathoms), but this coal was worked only in the 1930s during the last few years of the mine's life.

The other two pits (Kettledrum and Mary) were the first pits and were sunk only to the Hutton seam. Unaccountably, Morley claimed in 1882 that only one of these pits reached the Hutton coal, and that the other stopped short at the Shield Row. The Durham Mining Museum states both reached the Hutton coal, a conclusion supported by documents from the North of England Institute of Mining and Mechanical Engineers.

Since 1862, collieries have been required by law to have at least two pits reaching any seams being worked, see Hartley Colliery disaster.

The Busty pit was the downcast pit, meaning air passed down the pit to ventilate the workings. The Lamp pit was the upcast pit, meaning air passed up the pit. At the time of both disasters the ventilation was by induced draft provided by 30 (later 35)-foot diameter fan.

In 1882 coal was drawn up the Busty shaft from the Busty and Hutton seams. By 1909 only the Busty level was serviced directly: coal was lowered down a staple (Note: A small internal shaft.) from the Towneley and down a drift from the Tilley. Because mechanical ventilation was used (rather than the earlier furnace system), coal could be drawn up the upcast. In 1882 the Low Main and Shield Row coals were serviced by the Lamp shaft; in 1909 only the Brockwell coal was raised this way.

=== Firedamp ===
Mines with a significant amount of firedamp were categorized as "fiery mines" and had special rules to mitigate the danger. In 1882 the manager (William Johnson) would not admit that West Stanley was a fiery mine; however, the rules applicable to such a mine were in force. The official enquiry conducted at the time states that "the presence of gas had been reported frequently during the four or five months before the explosion". In the 1909 report firedamp "had only been reported once during the present year [1909]".

== 1882 disaster ==
The 1882 explosion occurred at 1 a.m. on 19 April. It was localized in the Busty seam. From the shafts, major passages known as "headways" radiated off north, south and west. Each headway gave access to a district. From the north and south headways, other passageways were driven: the north and south cross-cuts, each of which led to a sub-district. The explosion occurred within the north cross-cut district where two men had been working, and from the position of the men and their food, they appeared to have been taking a food break. A large stone measuring "from 4 to 5 yards long, 2 feet broad, and from 10 inches to a foot in thickness" (approximately 4m x 0.6m x 28 cm) had fallen from the roof. Above it was a large hole going up at least 15 feet (4.6 m) possibly as much as 36 feet (11 m) to the coal seam above. The report concluded that this fall released a large quantity of firedamp which had been under pressure within the cavity. The inspector was unable to decide which of two things then happened: either that the outrush of gas was sufficient to blow the flame through the gauze of one of their safety lamps, or that as the men started to move away from the fall, they snatched up their lamps causing a sufficient air current to pass the flame.

There had been indications of a large quantity of gas in the area; not only had it already been detected but hissing and bubbling sounds had been heard before the explosion. There had also been a heaving of the floor and fissures had been seen. The lamps in use were Clanny lamps, which were known to pass the flame in a moderate current. The owner had tried to introduce Mueseler lamps (which withstand a greater current of air) but the men had resisted them since they gave a poorer light. The six lamps found near the seat of the explosion were tested. All passed, but some were slightly damaged and three were unlocked.

The inspector reported that the mine management was somewhat deficient. No certified copy of the rules could be found, one of the deputies was illiterate so could not have read and enforced the rules, reports were not made in the correct books, licenses for men who were permitted to carry lamp keys and fire shots were not issued, and the barometer and thermometer records were not correctly kept. However, in his final remarks Morley accepted that on this occasion, the management deficiencies did not contribute to the disaster.

== 1909 disaster ==
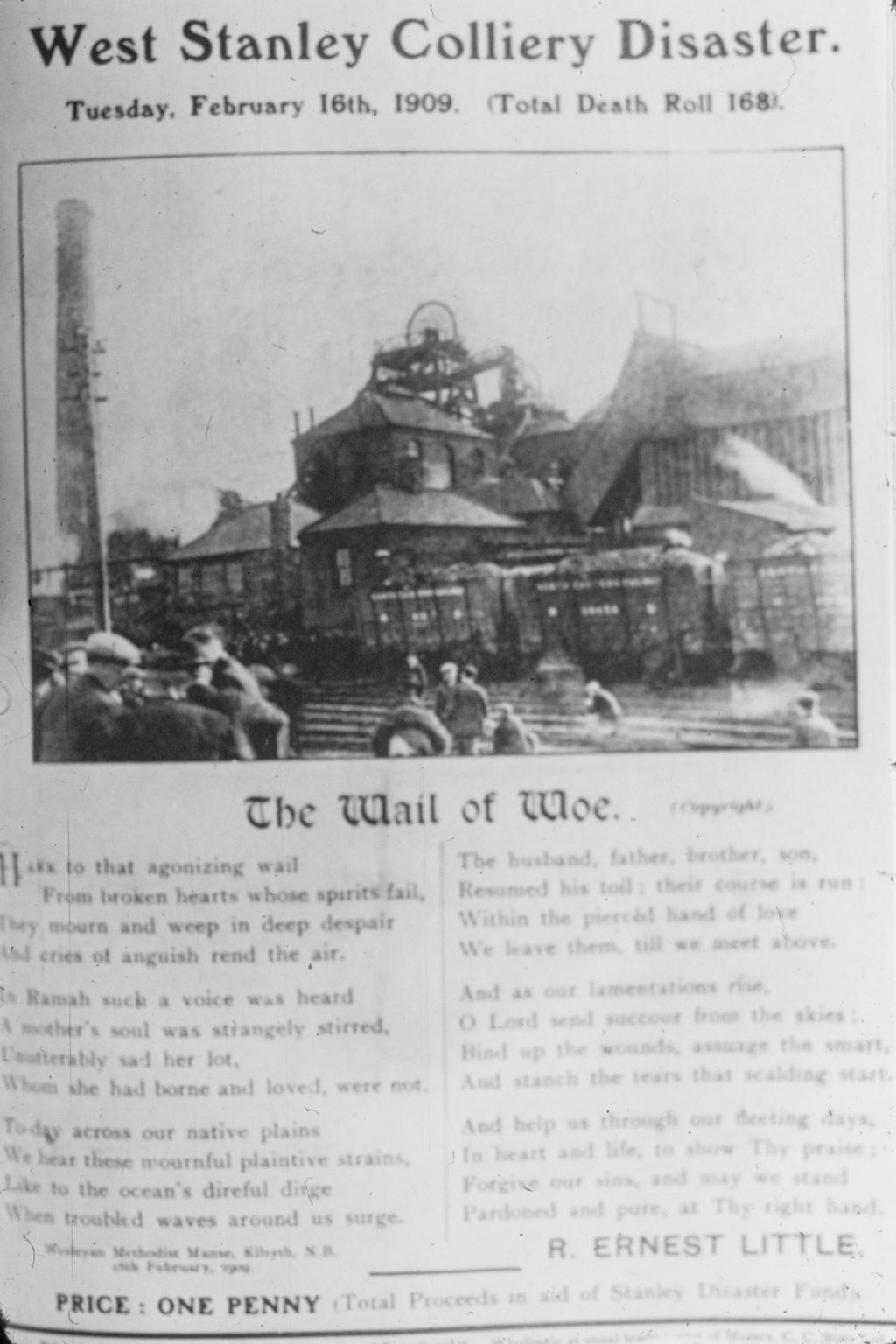
A poem titled "The Wail of Woe" is sold to raise money for families impacted from the West Stanley Colliery accident.

The 1909 explosion occurred at 3:45 p.m. on 16 February. By 2 a.m. the next day, the downcast shaft was available for rescue parties to descend. They entered the Townely and Busty seams, and from thence went into the Tilley seam. In the latter they found and brought out 26 men. From the Townley seam four men were found, but one died from the effects of afterdamp after 30 hours. Eventually another 165 bodies were retrieved; two men were still unaccounted for when the search was called off. In 1933 later workings broke into the Busty seam and two skeletons were discovered, which were identified as the missing men.

=== Background ===
By 1909, a significant amount of electricity was being used underground. Two electrically driven coal cutting machines were used in the Townley seam and one each in the Tilley and Brockwell seams. The largest motors underground were the 100 horsepower (75 kW) pump in the Busty seam near to the Busty shaft, and the 100 horsepower (75 kW) haulage motor in the Townley seam. There were also two smaller 25 horsepower motors and three 5 horsepower motors elsewhere in the colliery. To power this, a 40 Hz 550 volt 150 amp, three-phase generator was installed on the surface, which delivered the power through insulated (though unarmoured) cables down the Busty shaft.

As well as the motors, there were a few incandescent lamps around the shafts. All other illumination was from Marsaut and Donald type safety lamps. The lamps were lit and locked on the surface, and if extinguished had to be sent back to the surface for relighting.

A coroner's inquest, with a jury, was held following the discovery in 1933 of the two skeletons. At the inquest, J. B. Atkinson, a retired mines inspector, attempted to present evidence that another type of lamp was in use: the Howart's Patent Deflector, which was larger than standard safety lamps. Atkinson argued that the larger volume of the lamp's flame chamber made it unsafe, because an explosion inside it would be large enough to pass through the enclosing gauze and ignite gases in the surrounding atmosphere. The coroner allowed Atkinson to read out his statement, but directed the jury to disregard it in determining the cause of death.

Other preventive measures were watering, control of shot-firing, and inspections. Watering to keep coal dust damp was performed regularly; however, the inspector at the 1909 inquest cast doubt upon its effectiveness, having observed pools of water next to dry dust. Shot-firing to bring down stone and, in some seams, coal, appears to have been tightly controlled. Inspections were meant to be carried out every three months. The reports from January 1909 could not be produced, but those from September 1908 were produced and were all satisfactory.

=== Explosion ===
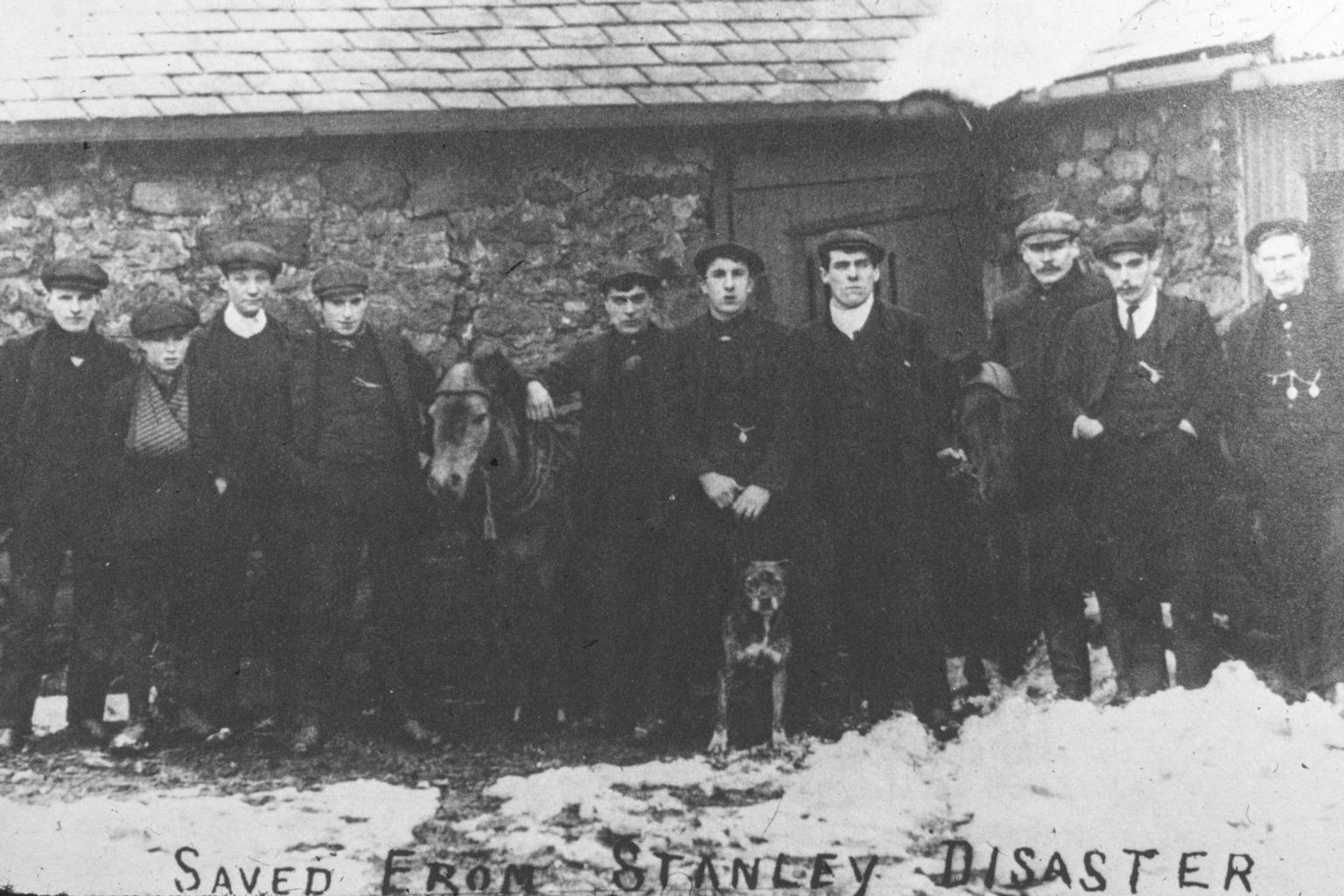
Stanley disaster survivors

Five minutes before the explosion, the man in charge of the large pump in the Busty seam advised the generator house that he was about to start the pump. This was normal procedure. Five minutes later, there was a "burring" noise from the generators indicating an electrical overload, followed by two of the three (one per phase) fuses blowing. Smoke issued from the downcast shaft, in other words moving against the air flow, followed fifty seconds later by a fireball and cloud of smoke. A few moments later, the cloud was sucked back down the downcast shaft as air circulation re-established.

Both main shafts were damaged by the explosion. The downcast (Busty) shaft suffered damage all the way to the surface, and then the casing between the pit top and the heapstead (Note: The heapstead is a structure where the cages were loaded and unloaded with men, materials and coal. It was raised above ground so that coal processing could be gravity assisted. Formerly a considerable amount of coal dust was drawn down into the pit here, but by 1909 screening from the pit top to the heapstead had been erected to prevent this.) was blown down. The upcast (lamp) pit also suffered damage, but fortunately the fan was uninjured and continued to run.

Before the district inspector could arrive, the shaftmen had already started to clear away the debris from the downshaft. A temporary hospital was established at the pithead, medical and rescue stores were brought in, and by 2 a.m., the cages could be lowered down the pit. The men mentioned above were brought up, but there were no further survivors. Recovery and exploration work went on "unceasingly" until 6 days after the explosion, and all but two of the bodies had been recovered and brought up. Because of increasing danger to the recovery parties, the search for these two was abandoned. (Their remains were found later in 1933.)

=== Investigation ===
The first step in investigating a colliery explosion is to determine where the explosion occurred. In the case of West Stanley, the official report states "in no case that we [i.e. Redmayne and Bain] have investigated has it been more perplexing than the one under consideration". The first thought was that the seat of the explosion might have been in or near the engine house in the Towneley seam, but further investigation rendered this unlikely. The Brockwell seam was next considered. There was evidence of some burning, this being the only place in the mine where it was observed. No cause of ignition, accumulation of gas or the presence of a blower (Note: A fissure from which a stream of gas emerges) was found. Further damage to the props and the separation door indicated that the explosion had swept into the seam ("inbye") before sweeping out ("outbye").

There was no damage to the Tilley seam, and the men working there had been saved, so it was not considered further. The only seam left was the Busty coal. The onsetter, Matthew Elliott, was the only man to have survived from the Busty seam, and his evidence is quoted at length. Critically, he said that the electric lights went out at the time the explosion was heard ("Yes, it was instantaneous"), some time before the cloud was observed by a safety lamp. Two mining engineers who had arrived at 8 p.m., following the explosion, were cross examined; they agreed that the explosion occurred in the Busty seam and was due to coal dust, though neither could say how the dust was ignited.

The inquiry next considered how the coal dust might have been ignited, and four possibilities were considered: open lights (lamps or matches), shot firing, sparking from friction, and electricity. No evidence of faulty lights or contraband was found (though there remains the question of the Howart's Patent Deflector reported at the 1933 inquiry). All shots were accounted for and every shot hole inspected; none was fired at the time or shortly before the explosion. Friction from tubs (coal wagons) against the rails or following a derailment was considered and dismissed.

Electricity was considered. The fuses within the mine did not blow, but evidence from the colliery electrician mentioned a previous occasion when sparking had burnt through a cable and not blown the fuses. Dr W M Thornton, Professor of Electrical Engineering at Armstrong College was called as a witness. He considered three causes but settled on one in particular as the most likely: that a train of coal dust between the terminals of a junction box or switch caused arcing between the terminals, which ignited the coal dust and caused an explosion within the box. This explosion raised enough dust to trigger a bigger, fatal, explosion that spread throughout the mine.

The report concluded with a number of recommendations, including better mechanical protection of electrical equipment (impact and ingress of gas or dust), trip coils in place of fuses, and better cleaning.

=== Commemoration ===
The Tanfield singer-songwriter Tommy Armstrong composed a five-verse poem, "In Memory of 168 Men and Boys who lost their Lives by the West Stanley Explosion. February 16, 1909". This was published as a one-penny broadsheet, with the tune given as Cassells in the Air: (Note: Castles in the Air, the title of a Scots dialect poem by James Ballantine, was originally set to a reel. Transformed into a slow strathspey in the 1880s, it was used as the melody for several songs in the North of England.)

Two Hundred men and boys left home, but little did they know,
That some of them were doomed to die that day, when down below;
With cheerful heart and willing hand, each one did freely toil,
For to earn his daily bread, so far beneath the soil.
That morn before they went to work, the husband he would say:
"Good Morning," to his partner, before he went away.
He then would kiss his little ones – so affectionate and kind –
He little thought forever he was leaving them behind.
May God protect the widows and raise up each drooping head,
And may the little orphans never have to cry for bread.
We hope our fellow-workmen, that has only gone before,
Has reached the place of happiness, to rest for evermore.

— Tommy Armstrong (1909), In Memory of 168 Men and Boys who lost their Lives by the West Stanley Explosion (first verse and chorus)

=== Memorials ===
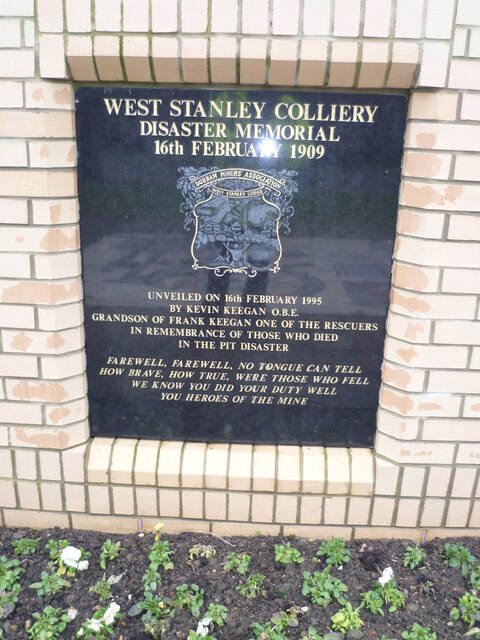
Central plaque of the 1995 memorial to the 1909 West Stanley Pit Disaster

There are two memorials to the 1909 disaster: an ornate pedestal and urn unveiled in 1913, four years after the event, and one unveiled in 1995, 86 years afterwards, that features a former colliery winding wheel. In addition, a memorial headstone to mark the mass graves of those who died was dedicated in 2005. A memorial service in 2009 marked the centenary of the disaster.

== Bibliography ==
- BBC (February 2004), "Work: The Hartley Mining Disaster", Legacies – Tyne, BBC
- DMM (2015), "West Stanley Colliery", Durham Mining Museum. Shaft details are hyperlinked from this main page.
- Havery, Gavin (16 February 2009), "Hundreds mark 100th anniversary of disaster", Northern Echo
- Havery, Gavin (13 August 2013), West Stanley Disaster - Miners Lamp Newspaper Article
- Morley, Arnold (11 July 1882), Report on the Explosion which occurred at the West Stanley Colliery on the 19th April 1882
- Redmayne, R A S; Bain, R Donald (1909), Report on the Circumstances attending an Explosion which occurred in the workings of the West Stanley Colliery on the 16th February, 1909
- sparty_lea (3 September 2008), Burns Colliery, West Stanley (PDF), AditNow, archived from the original (PDF) on 18 July 2014
- Taylor, Fionn, ed. (2015), "West Stanley, Durham. 16th February, 1909", Mining Website
