= Clough Dene =

Coordinates: 54.890°N 1.733°W

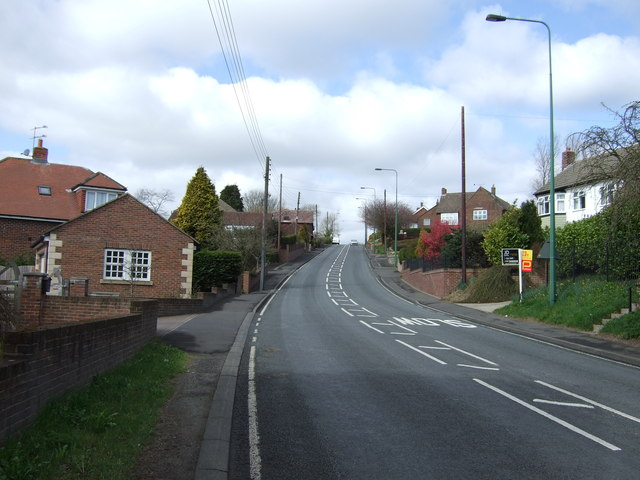
- Through Clough Dene

- Location within County Durham
- Civil parish: Stanley
- Unitary authority: County Durham
- Ceremonial county: Durham
- Region: North East
- Country: England
- Sovereign state: United Kingdom
- Police: Durham
- Fire: County Durham and Darlington
- Ambulance: North East

Clough Dene is a hamlet in the civil parish of Stanley, in County Durham, England. It is situated a short distance to the north of Tantobie, a few miles from Stanley and Annfield Plain.
