= Stanley, County Durham =

Town and civil parish in County Durham, England

Coordinates: 54.867°N 1.692°W

Stanley
- Town and civil parish
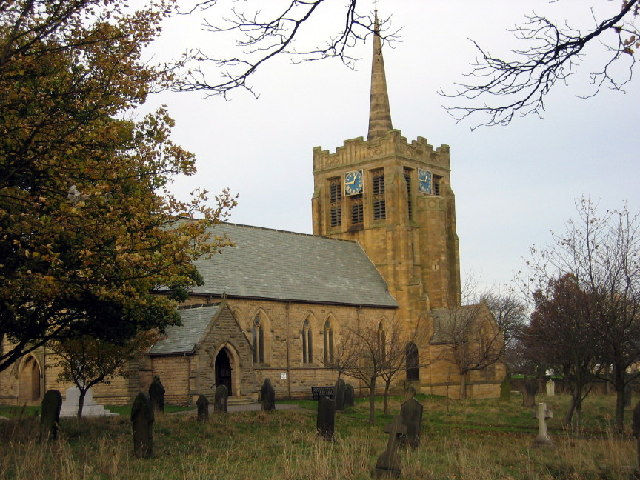
- St. Andrew's Church, Stanley

- Location within County Durham
- Population: 31,300 (2019)
- OS grid reference: NZ197525
- Civil parish: Stanley
- Unitary authority: County Durham
- Ceremonial county: County Durham
- Region: North East
- Country: England
- Sovereign state: United Kingdom
- Post town: STANLEY
- Postcode district: DH9
- Dialling code: 01207
- Police: Durham
- Fire: County Durham and Darlington
- Ambulance: North East
- UK Parliament: North Durham
- Website: http://www.stanley-tc.gov.uk

Stanley is a town and civil parish in County Durham, England. Centred on a hilltop between Chester-le-Street and Consett, it lies south-west of Gateshead. The town's name is derived from the Old English stān and lēah, meaning "stony woodland clearing".

The local economy was once based on coal-mining and other heavy industries; with their disappearance or substantial decline, Stanley is now primarily a commuter town. Its core began to grow in the 19th century through the expansion and merger of the mining villages of East Stanley and West Stanley.

== History ==
Some archaeological evidence of possible Iron Age and Roman activity has been found in the Stanley area.

Stanley is referred to in an early 13th century episcopal actum – a documented decision – of Richard Poore, Bishop of Durham from 1228 to 1237. Dated between 1228 and 1234, it confirms the granting of the vill of Stanley and some land in Durham to William de Kilkenny.

The first printed map of the Bishopric of Durham was created in 1576. Published in 1579 as part of the cartographer Christopher Saxton's county atlas, it shows Stanley as "Standley". In 1611, John Speed, a famous English mapmaker who built on Saxton's work, created a map of the bishopric that also shows Stanley as "Standley".

The 1909 West Stanley Pit Disaster, one of the worst in the history of British coal mining, occurred at West Stanley Colliery on 16 February of that year. 168 men and boys were killed. An explosion at the same colliery in 1882 had killed 13 men. On 22 August 1947, an explosion at the Louisa Morrison Colliery killed 22 men.

Stanley was served by the Stanhope and Tyne Railway, which had two stations in the town: West Stanley, and Annfield Plain. Both closed in 1955.

Tanfield Lea was the site of the Ever Ready company's largest British battery factory, a major local employer. The factory opened, to much fanfare, in 1968, had around 950 employees – mainly former miners – at its peak in the 1970s, and closed in 1996. The British Steel plant in the neighbouring town of Consett (some 7 miles (11 km) from Stanley) also had many ex-miners among the several thousand employed when it closed in 1980, part of a wave of redundancies affecting workers in the traditional heavy industries of the region.

The Stanley Blues Festival took place on the first weekend in August between 1993 and 2007, with appearances by local, national, and international blues artists and other musical acts. Nearly 15,000 people attended in 2002, the event's tenth anniversary. With support from the then-Derwentside District Council, Durham County Council and the regional arm of Arts Council England, admission was free.

In mid-2023, Stanley Town Council handed back Stanley Civic Hall, the town's long-standing arts venue and community hub, to Durham County Council. Amidst political controversy, it closed shortly afterwards, and was put up for sale in early 2024. The Civic Hall was formerly known as the Lamplight Arts Centre, which opened in 1961. The council had taken over its running in mid-2013. The Civic Hall hosted concerts, recitals, plays and shows in the Alun Armstrong Theatre, had an independent cinema, put on exhibitions, held classes and seminars, and was a weddings and corporate events venue.

In late 2023, the owners of the Beamish Football Centre training ground announced that government funding had been secured for a major refurbishment and upgrade, with work starting in 2024.

== Villages and settlements ==
The civil parish, created in 2007, (Note: In 2005, the UK government gave permission for the creation of the parish and council following a petition organised and submitted by the then Derwentside District Council.) incorporates the town of Stanley and the following villages and settlements:

- north of the town: Shield Row, Kip Hill, and Causey
- east: No Place
- south-east: Bloemfontein, The Middles, and Craghead
- south: South Moor and Quaking Houses
- south-west: Oxhill, Catchgate, New Kyo, Greencroft, and Annfield Plain
- west: West Kyo and Harelaw
- north-west: Tanfield Lea, Harperley, White-le-Head, Tantobie, Coppy, Tanfield, and Clough Dene.

== Governance ==
Stanley, whose boundaries have changed over the years, has successively been part of the Lanchester Poor Law Union (from 1837 onwards); Stanley Local Board (1892); Stanley Urban District (1894); (Note: The Stanley Urban District created in 1894 was part a network of boroughs, urban district and rural district councils set up after the formation of Durham County Council in 1889. It comprised West Stanley, Shield Row and South Moor. In 1895, separate urban districts were created for Annfield Plain and Tanfield. In 1937, the three districts were combined to form a greatly enlarged Stanley Urban District.) Derwentside District (1974); (Note: Derwentside District was created by amalgamating Stanley Urban District (as created in 1937), Consett Urban District and Lanchester Rural District. The urban and rural districts were abolished.) and County Durham (2009). (Note: The reorganisation of 2009 abolished Derwentside and other districts created in 1974.)

Stanley is in the UK parliamentary constituency of North Durham. Since July 2024, this has been represented in the House of Commons by Luke Akehurst of the Labour Party.

=== Town Council ===
Since 2007, Stanley Town Council has provided the first tier of local government. The council has the statutory right to do whatever it considers will improve the economic, social or environmental well-being of the area. It has a duty to provide allotments and to take into account the potential impact of every policy and action on reducing crime. The council's powers include the provision and maintenance of bus shelters, community centres, play areas and play equipment, and the awarding of grants to local community organisations. It can also issue fixed penalty fines for offences such as littering, graffiti, fly-posting, and contraventions of dog control orders.

The town council has 20 councillors, elected every four years by electors in the seven parish wards. (Note: Annfield Plain, Catchgate, Craghead & South Stanley, Havannah, South Moor, Stanley Hall and Tanfield.) The last election was in May 2025. The council has four thematic committees. Each year the councillors elect, from amongst themselves, a chair and deputy chair of the council.

=== County Council ===
Durham County Council provides the second tier of local government. Its responsibilities include education, housing, social services, highways, planning and refuse collection. Five Stanley town councillors are also county councillors.

In May 2024, the county council became part of a new upper tier of local government, the North East Combined Authority, led by Mayor Kim McGuinness of the Labour Party.

==== Area Action Partnership (AAP) ====
The Stanley AAP, one of 14 in County Durham, is a non-political organisation and funding body engaged with tackling local issues. It involves members of the public and representatives of Durham County Council and Stanley Town Council, the police, the fire brigade, health, housing, and education providers, business, and voluntary organisations. Stanley AAP publishes a directory of local activities and advice and support services.

== Economy ==
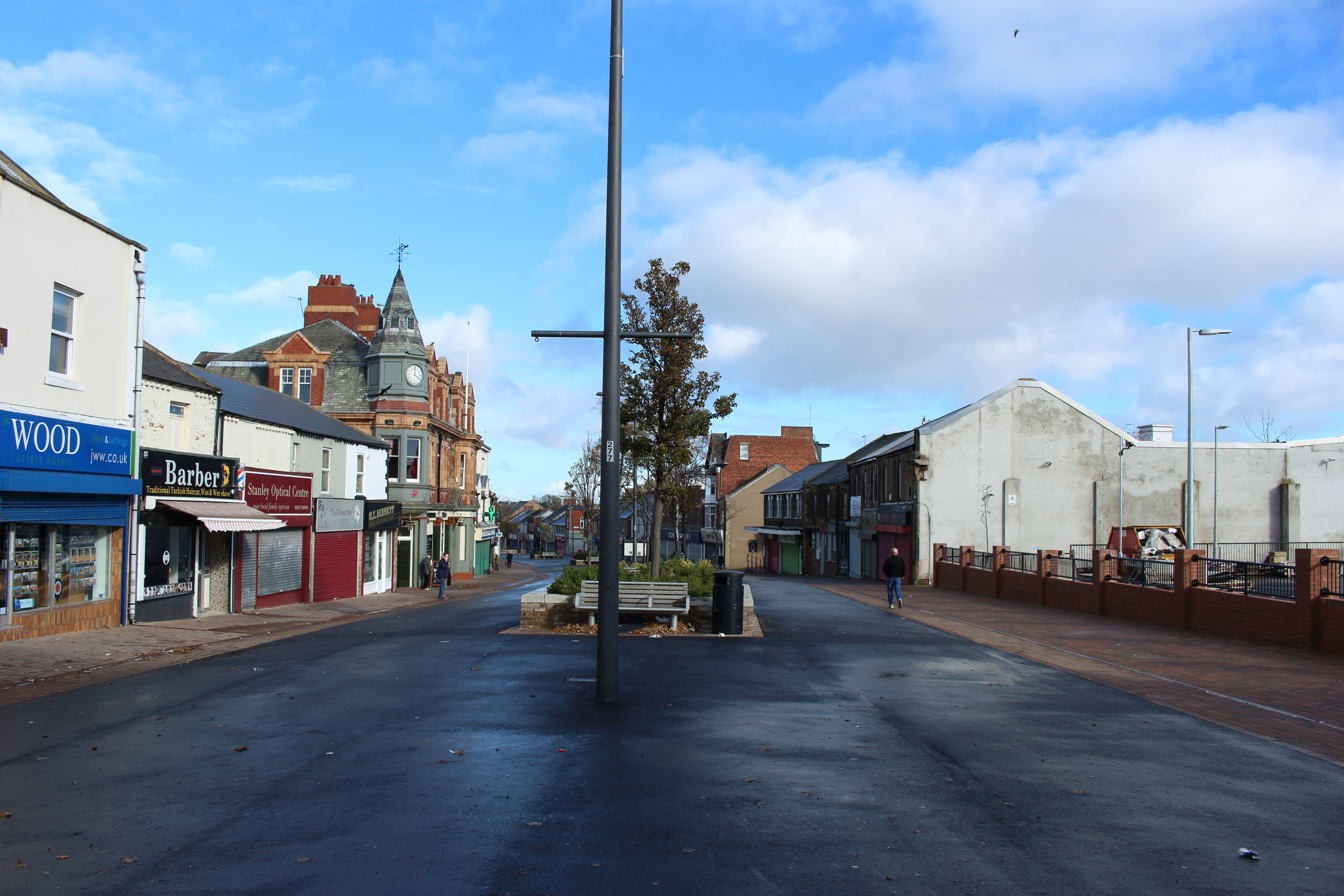
The pedestrianised Front Street

The three largest employment sectors for residents in the local area are retail, manufacturing, and health and social work, while the three largest industry groups (Note: Covering all businesses registered for VAT. The industry groups are derived from the UK's Standard Industrial Classification.) for local businesses are construction; professional, scientific and technical services; and retail.

Retailers in the town centre have faced significant competition from larger retail and leisure destinations elsewhere, including Clifford Road Retail Park, the MetroCentre, and Newcastle and Durham city centres. Online shopping, encouraged by the COVID-19 pandemic, has also changed shopping patterns and contributed to a weakening of footfall.

Stanley's main shopping area, Front Street, is pedestrianised, housing independent shops and chain stores. A market is held on Thursdays and Saturdays; it has declined over the years.

There are several prominent buildings in the centre of Stanley that are vulnerable (Note: For example, in 2008, an arson attack destroyed the Victorian-era former Co-op premises.) or vacant.

== Transport ==
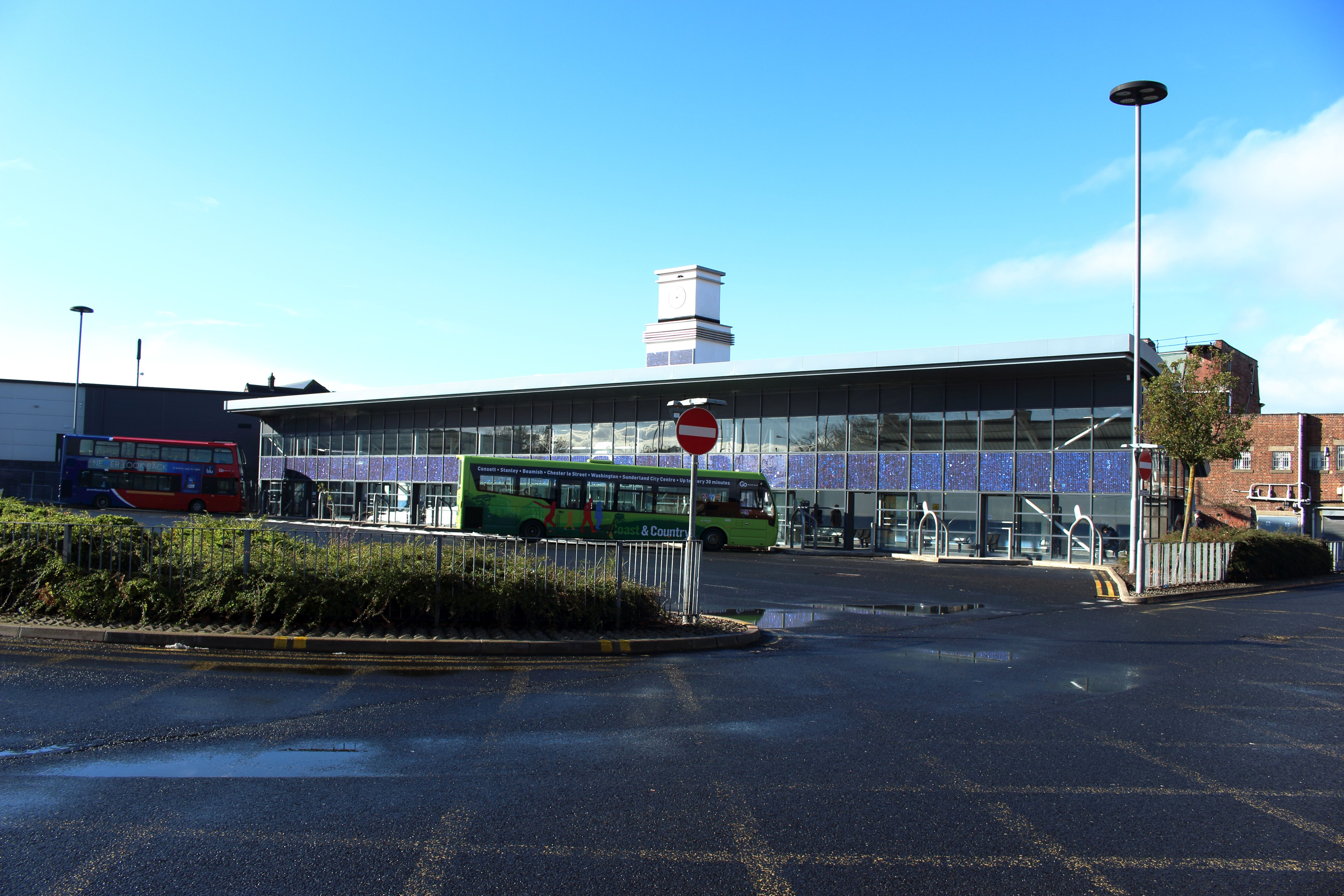
Stanley Bus Station

Via the A693, Stanley is about 4 miles (6.4 km) from junction 63 of the A1(M) motorway.

The bus station is an interchange for local and regional services operated by Go North East and other companies. Key routes connect the town with Durham, Consett, Darlington, Lanchester, Gateshead and Newcastle upon Tyne.

The nearest Tyne & Wear Metro stations are Felling, Stadium and Gateshead, each around 8 miles (13 km) away; all three serve both lines of the network. The closest railway station is 3.5 miles (5.6 km) away at Chester-le-Street on the East Coast Main Line.

Newcastle International Airport and the Newcastle International Ferry Terminal are each about 13 miles (21 km) away.

== Education ==
As well as several primary schools, Stanley has two secondary schools: North Durham Academy, and Tanfield School, a specialist science and engineering college. St Bede's Catholic School & Sixth Form College, an academy, is in the nearby village of Lanchester.

There are public libraries in Annfield Plain, South Moor and at the Louisa Centre, with many others in the surrounding area.

== Leisure and community activities ==
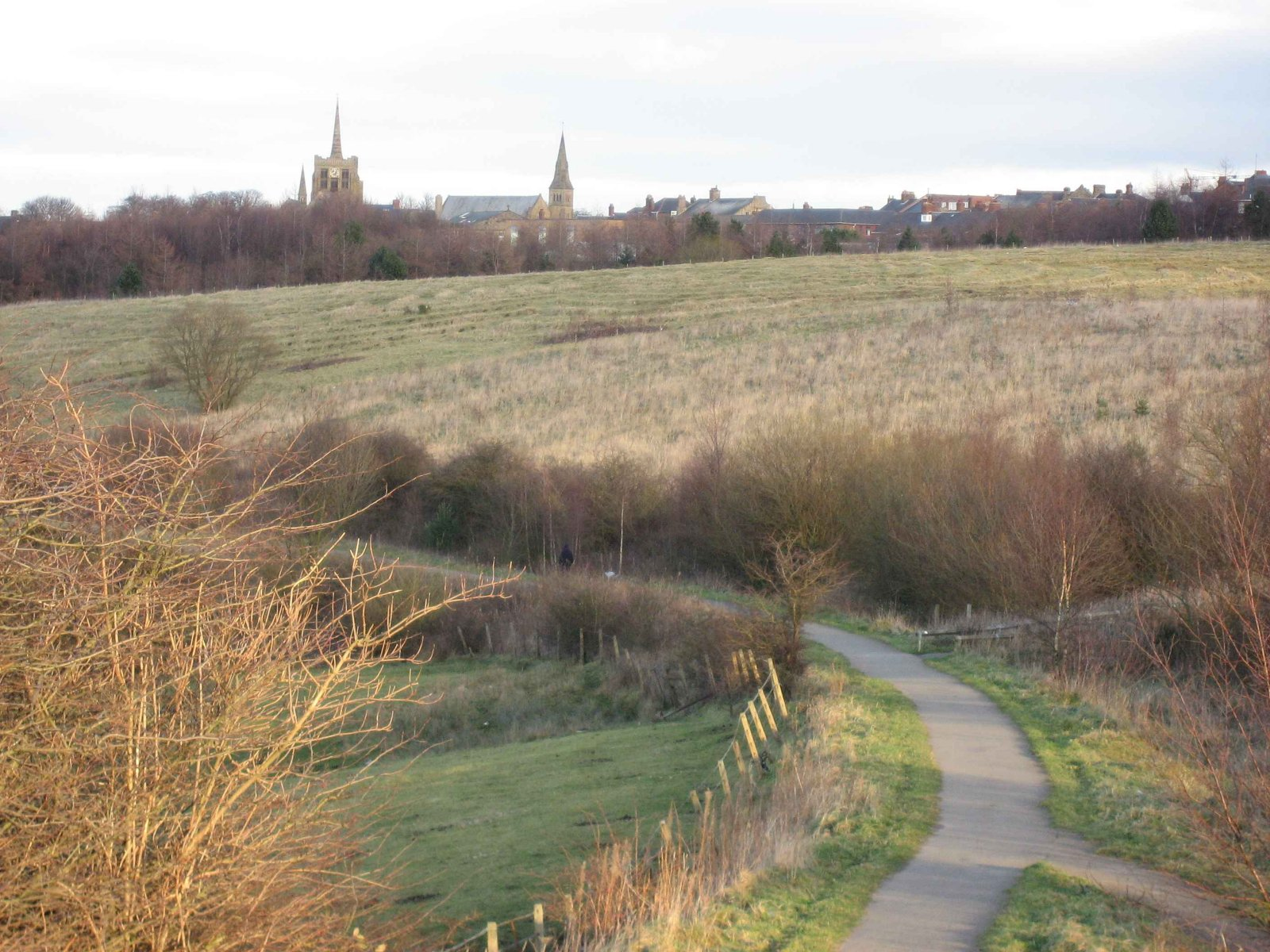
Stanley viewed from the C2C Cycle Route

The C2C Cycle Route skirts Stanley to the north. This 140 miles (225 km) long route links Whitehaven in Cumbria, on England's north-west coast, with Roker Beach in Tyne & Wear on the north-east coast.

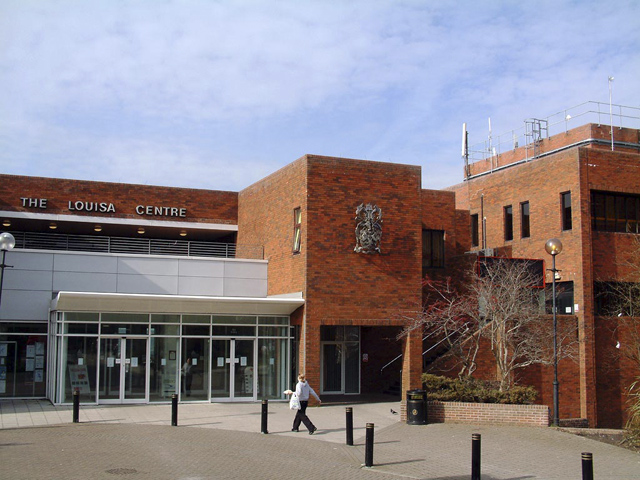
The Louisa Centre sports and leisure complex

The Louisa Centre, a sports and leisure complex, contains a gym, a 25-metre swimming pool (with a 300-seat spectators' gallery), a small pool, a sports hall, a shooting range, a soft play area, a nursery, meeting rooms, a café, and Stanley Library.

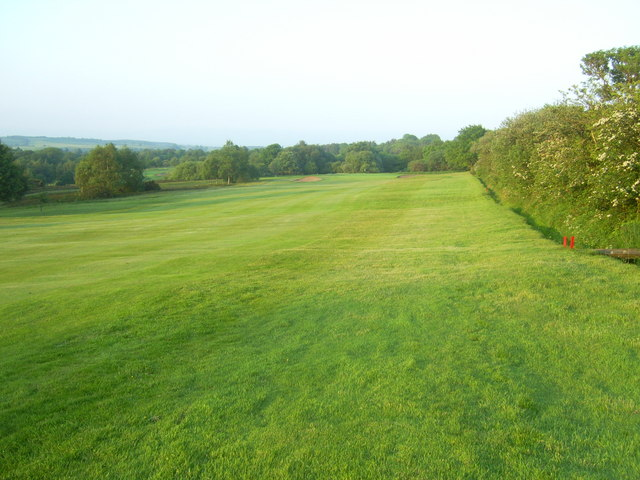
Fairway and rough on South Moor Golf Course

South Moor Golf Course, lying south of the town and to the west of The Middles, was founded in 1923 and first operated by the National Coal Board. Redesigned in 1925 by Alister MacKenzie, a famous golf course architect, the course has 18 holes. It has a practice area, a short-game area, a pro shop, and a clubhouse that can host functions.

The Stanley Indoor Bowls Centre, with a large arena and grandstand, offers play for people of all ages and abilities. Inaugurated in 1977, it has hosted several top-level international events. The centre also provides meeting facilities for a range of community groups and clubs.

The Venue, a community centre and events space, has facilities for dance and martial arts classes, sports, theatrical productions, concerts, weddings and parties, meetings and cooking classes. It also has a small gym. Organisations based in or accessible via The Venue include Citizens Advice, Age UK, Foodbank, Community Money Advice, Welfare Rights, and Durham Action on Single Housing (DASH).

=== Youth clubs and activities for children ===
Under the umbrella of SAYC, the Stanley Area Youth Consortium, trips and activities for children and young people in the wider Stanley area are offered by an array of youth clubs and voluntary associations.

These include Stanley Young People's Club, focused on the South Stanley and South Moor areas; Oxhill Youth Club, founded in 1962, which runs the Duke of Edinburgh's Award scheme locally; the Activity Den, based in Tanfield Lea, active for nearly 20 years; Clavering Youth Club; Beamish Community Football Club; North Road Gym, a boxing club for young amateurs; PACT House, a community hub; and several community halls, schools and churches.

== Notable people ==
- John Curr (c. 1756–1823), born in West Kyo, managed the Duke of Norfolk's collieries in Sheffield from 1781 to 1801. Several of his technological innovations contributed to the development of the coal-mining industry.
- John Buddle (1773–1843), born in West Kyo, was a prominent mining engineer and entrepreneur who helped improve the safety of coal-mining. His innovations included the use of the Davy Lamp.
- Jonathan Rodham (1843–1917), who lived in Oxhill before emigrating to the US, was Hillary Clinton's great-grandfather.
- Thomas "Tommy" Armstrong (1848–1920), famed as a songwriter and music-hall performer, lived for most of his life in Tanfield Lea. He was known as "The Pitman Poet" and "The Bard of the Northern Coalfield".
- David Horsley (1873–1933), born in Stanley, was a founder of the Hollywood-based US film industry.
- Frank Keegan (?–1916), from West Stanley, was one of the heroes of the 1909 West Stanley Pit disaster and Kevin Keegan's grandfather.
- Michael Heaviside (1880–1939), a miner who lived in Craghead, served in the Durham Light Infantry during the First World War and, in 1917, was awarded the Victoria Cross for his heroism during the Battle of Arras.
- Joseph Crawford (1910–1997), born in New Kyo, was a coal miner and trade unionist who became general secretary of NACODS, the National Association of Colliery Overmen, Deputies and Shotfirers (1960–1973); he became president of the Trades Union Congress (TUC) in 1973. He was appointed an Officer of the Order of the British Empire (OBE) in 1971.
- Tom Lamb (1928–2016) was a miner at Craghead colliery and an artist who sketched and painted the underground life of miners as well as County Durham landscapes.
- Alun Armstrong (born 1946) is an actor from Annfield Plain.
- Micky Horswill (born 1953), from Annfield Plain, is a former professional footballer who played as a midfielder for Sunderland, Manchester City, Plymouth Argyle, Hull City, Happy Valley (Hong Kong) and Carlisle United.
- Kim Darroch (born 1954), from South Stanley, was Britain's ambassador to the United States from 2016 to 2019.
- Mak Wilson (born 1957), from Shield Row, was a puppeteer for Jim Henson's Creature Shop and the BBC, working on films including Labyrinth, Teenage Mutant Ninja Turtles, Babe and Muppets Most Wanted.
- Yvonne Ridley (born 1958), from Stanley, a journalist, author and politician, was held captive by the Taliban in Afghanistan for 11 days in 2001.
- Glenn McCrory (born 1964), from Annfield Plain, was the IBF cruiserweight champion from 1989 to 1990.
- Brian Tinnion (born 1968) is a former Newcastle United and Bristol City footballer from Burnopfield.
- Carly Telford (born 1987), from Tanfield, is a former professional footballer who played as a goalkeeper for Notts County Ladies F.C., Chelsea and the England women's national football team.
- Lewis Miley (born 2006), from Stanley, is a professional footballer who plays for Newcastle United and the England national under-20 football team.

== Memorials and commemorations ==
=== Memorials ===
==== Pit disasters ====
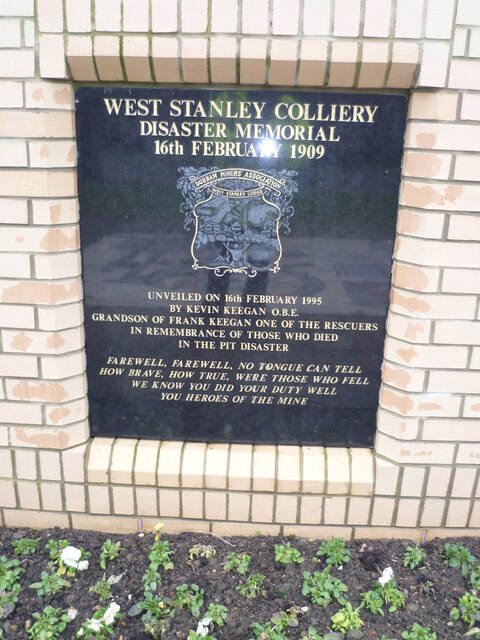
Central plaque of the 1995 memorial to the 1909 West Stanley Pit Disaster

There are two memorials to the 1909 West Stanley Pit Disaster: one unveiled in 1913, four years after the event, and another unveiled in 1995, 86 years after. In addition, a memorial headstone to mark the mass graves of those who died was dedicated in 2005.

A memorial to the 1947 Louisa Morrison Pit Disaster was unveiled in 1997 on the fiftieth anniversary of the event; it was rededicated in 2018 after being moved to another site. A service to mark the seventy-fifth anniversary took place in Annfield Plain Park in 2022.

==== Wars ====
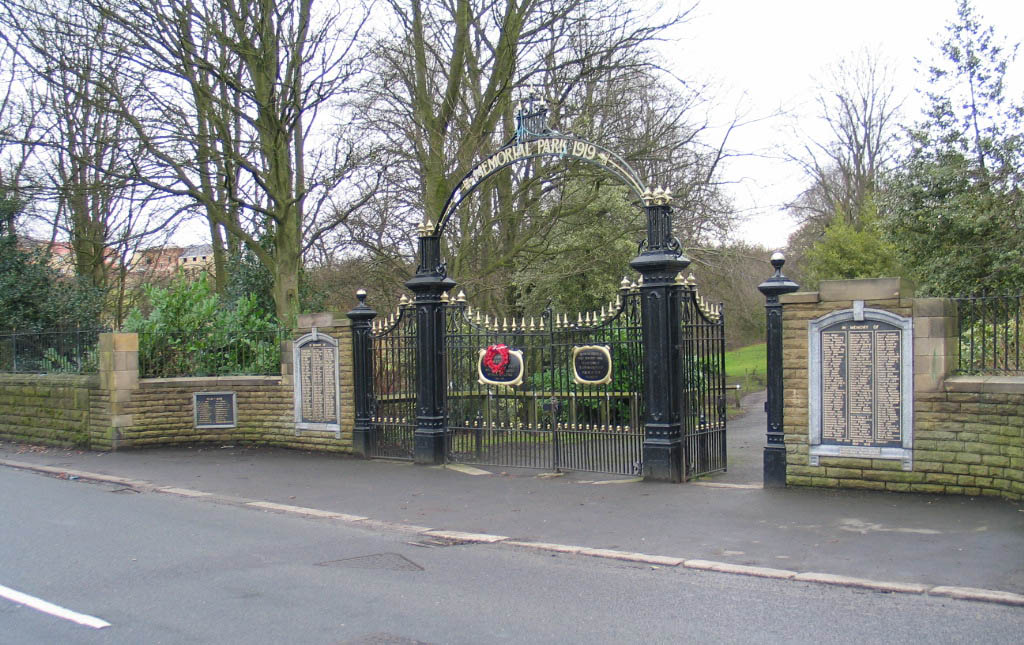
Gates of South Moor Memorial Park

South Moor Memorial Park was opened in 1920 and dedicated to the memory of employees of the South Moor Colliery Company who died in WWI. It was rededicated in 1950 to also commemorate those who died in WWII. (Note: A casualty of the Korean War was later added to the WWII plaque.)

The war memorial in Annfield Plain Park is inscribed with the names of the 263 men of Annfield Plain who died in WWI and the 66 in WWII. The memorial in Craghead, located off Edward Street, lists the names of the 109 local men who died in WWI and the 53 in WWII.

The Masonic Hall in Stanley has a plaque commemorating members of the Coronation Lodge who served or were killed in WWI.

=== Commemorations ===
Armed Forces Day, an official UK event, is observed on the last Saturday in June.

Miners' Sunday, a celebration of Stanley's heritage, takes place in late August.
