= Quaking Houses =

Village in County Durham, England

Coordinates: 54.852°N 1.706°W

- Location within County Durham
- OS grid reference: NZ189508
- Unitary authority: County Durham
- Ceremonial county: County Durham
- Region: North East
- Country: England
- Sovereign state: United Kingdom
- Post town: DURHAM
- Postcode district: DH9
- Police: Durham
- Fire: County Durham and Darlington
- Ambulance: North East

Quaking Houses is a small village near to the town of Stanley in County Durham, in England. It may have been originally settled by Quakers, but during the Industrial Revolution it developed into a mining village with traditional terraced houses. The Quaker origin is supported by the 1873 name for a mine with two shafts at the village called Quaker House Pit. However, an alternative origin is suggested by the following; the 1865 OS Map shows a farm called Quaking House to the north at Anfield Plain and a colliery railway line ran past this farm branching to the village mine. This colliery railway line was called the Quaking House Branch Line. A colloquial name for the village was "nanny goat island" perhaps reflecting the livestock kept in the extensive allotments and grazing area around the village.

Accessible by road only from the main South Moor Road, the village is dominated by one large road, with large strips of terraced housing on either side, both facing outwards. The large road is divided into several different street names: Third Street and Fourth Street, with Woodside Terrace and Fellside Terrace located at the west end. A large turning circle enables large vehicles, particularly buses, to change direction.

A shorter road parallel to the large road once had two streets, First Street and Second Street. The Community Hall which opened in 1997 stands where First street was once situated and Second Street still remains. The original housing stock was tied property which passed to the National Coal Board following nationalisation of the coal industry. The properties in Fellside and Woodside Terrace were larger than the other properties and were originally occupied by people with "middle management" occupations in the mining industry.

At one time at the bottom of Fourth Street stood a walled reservoir and at the top of the village on the fell in the woodland was a dam, both of which had been required for the mines in the area. The William Pit, colloquially known as the Billy Pit, and which, prior to nationalisation, was owned by the South Moor and Holmside Colliery Company [SM&HCC] stood near the reservoir. SM&HCC also operated a drift mine in the Stanley Burn valley to the north of Woodside Terrace.

Quaking Houses, from Langley View, south of New Kyo
