= The Middles =

Village in County Durham, England

Coordinates: 54.854°N 1.670°W

- Location within County Durham
- OS grid reference: NZ212510
- Unitary authority: County Durham
- Ceremonial county: County Durham
- Region: North East
- Country: England
- Sovereign state: United Kingdom
- Post town: Durham
- Postcode district: DH9
- Police: Durham
- Fire: County Durham and Darlington
- Ambulance: North East

The Middles is a village in County Durham, in England. It is situated between Stanley and Craghead.
