= South Moor =

Village in County Durham, England

Coordinates: 54.8623°N 1.7059°W

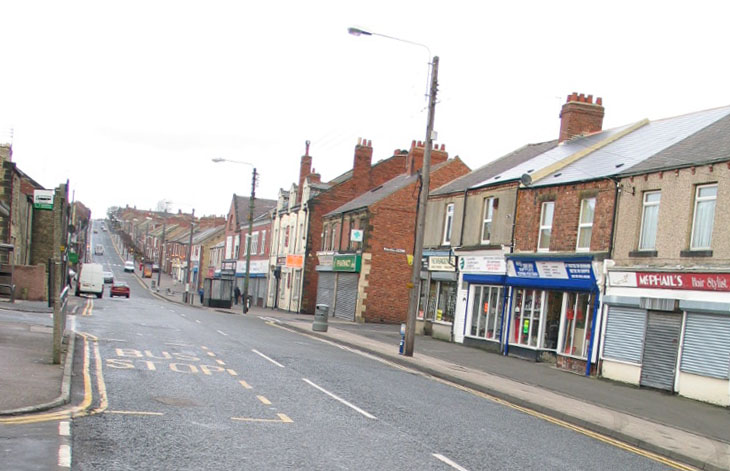
- Park Road

- Location within County Durham
- OS grid reference: NZ189519
- Civil parish: Stanley
- Unitary authority: County Durham
- Ceremonial county: Durham
- Region: North East
- Country: England
- Sovereign state: United Kingdom
- Post town: STANLEY
- Postcode district: DH9
- Dialling code: 01207
- Police: Durham
- Fire: County Durham and Darlington
- Ambulance: North East
- UK Parliament: North Durham

South Moor is a village in the civil parish of Stanley, in County Durham, England. It is located to the south-west of Stanley on the northern slope of the Craghead valley. It is a well-developed village, yet still semi-rural, containing a main street (Park Road) of around twelve shops which survive despite their proximity to the front street of Stanley and its Asda supermarket.

There was a branch of Stanley Co-op at the bottom of Park Rd and a glove factory above it. On the opposite side in a walled garden stood the Colliery Offices for the district. A local meeting place for teenagers in the 1950s and 1960s was Boves café which had a jukebox and sold coffee and snacks. The proprietor also had an ice cream factory around the back of the shop and vans travel about to this day selling to the public. There is a local church, St. Georges at the bottom of South Moor and "The Woodland Tavern" once was the Miners Hall.

== South Moor Park ==
South Moor Park is located at the bottom of the valley between Oxhill, and the small village of Quaking Houses. Alongside the large gates which denote the entrance to the park are names of local people who died during World War I. Two names, however, were deleted when it was discovered that the 'victims' had not actually died.

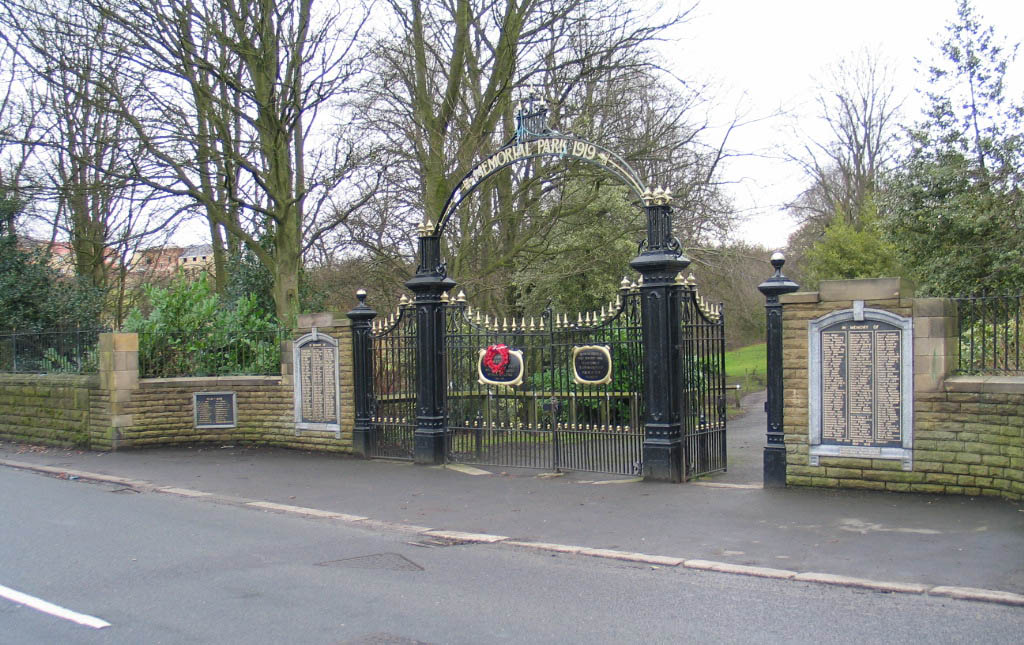
South Moor Park, gates

A stream passes through the park. The section of the park adjacent to Park Road features a bowling green and a public, concrete tennis court. Recent new development in the area has meant that the park is now undergoing refurbishment work.

The west side of the park is completely wooded. The main path follows the course of the stream. The remains of the bandstand is hidden by trees and growth and the remains of a previous paddling pool could be seen opposite the bandstand. This was well used in the 1930s by locals.

== Governance ==
On 30 September 1894 South Moor became a civil parish, being formed from the part of Lanchester in Stanley urban district, on 1 October 1916 the parish was abolished and merged with Stanley. In 1911 the parish had a population of 4054.
