= Wor Nanny's a mazer =

Song performed by Tommy Armstrong

Song by Tommy Armstrong
- Language: English (Geordie)
- Written: 1800s
- Songwriter(s): Tommy Armstrong

Wor Nanny's a mazer is a famous Geordie folk song written in the 19th century by Tommy Armstrong, in a style deriving from music hall. It is regarded by many as one of the classics.

This song tells the tale of a husband and wife setting out on a train trip from Rowlands Gill, a village in County Durham, to "toon" - meaning 'town', presumably Newcastle upon Tyne - to do some shopping. The trip starts to go wrong when they miss their train. The pair end up in a pub where the wife becomes "a bit the worse for wear". We are left to assume no shopping was done and no clothes bought.

== Lyrics ==
Verse 1
Wor Nanny and me myed up wor minds
te gan and catch the train,
For te gan te the Toon te buy some claes
for wor little Billy and Jane;
But when we got to Rowlands Gill
the mornin' train wes gyen,
And there was ne mair te gannin' that way
till siventeen minutes te one.
So aa says te wor Nan, "Its a lang way te gan,"
aa saa biv hor fyece she wes vext;
But aa says, "Nivvor mind, we hev plenty o'time,
so we'll stop and gan in wi' the next"
She gov a bit smile, when aa spoke up and said,
"There's a pubbilick hoose alang heor,
We'll gan alang there and hev worsels warmed,
and a glass of the best bittor beor"
Nan wes se' stoot aa knew she'd not waak,
and she didn't seem willin' te try;
When aa think o'the trubble aa'd wiv hor that day,
If aa liked aa cud borst oot and cry.

Chorus
Aye, wor Nannie's a mazer,
and a mazer she'll remain,
As lang as aa leeve,
aa winnet forget,
the day we lost the train.

Verse 2

So away we went te the pubbilick hoose,
and when we got te the door,
She says, "We'll gan inti the parlor end
For aa've nivvor been heor afore".
So in we went and teuk wor seats,
and afore aa rung the bell,
Aa axed hor what she was gannin' te hev,
"Why," she says, "The syem as yorsel"
So aa caalled for two gills o'the best bittor beor,
She paid for them when they com in;
But after she swalleyed three parts of hor gill,
She said, "Bob, man, aa'd rather hev gin."
So aa caalled for a glass o'the best Hollands gin,
And she gobbled it up the forst try;
Says aa te wor Nan, "Thoo's as gud as a man"
She says, "Bob man, aa felt varra dry."
So aa caalled for another, and that went the same way;
Aa says, "That'll settle thee thorst."
She says, "Aa've had two, and aa's nee better now
than aa was when aa swally'd the forst."

Chorus

Verse 3

She sat and drank till she got tight;
She says "Bob man, aa feel varra queer."
"Why", aa says, "Thoo's had nine glasses o'gin
Te maa three gills o'beor."
She lowsed hor hat and then hor shaal,
And hoyed them on te the floor;
Aa thowt she was gan te gan wrang in hor mind,
So aa sat mesel close by the door.
She says, "Give iss order, aa'll sing a bit sang"
Aa sat and aa glowered at hor;
Aa thowt she wes jokin', for aa'd nivvor hard,
Wor Nanny sing ony before.
She gave iss a touch of 'The Row in the Gutter',
She pleased every one that was there.
There was neebody in but wor Nanny and me,
and aa laughed till me belly was sair.
She tried te stand up for te sing the 'Cat Pie',
But she fell doon and myed sic a clatter,
She smashed fower chairs, and the landlord com in,
And he said, "What the deuce is the matter?"

Chorus

Verse 4
The landlord says, "Is this yor wife,
And where de ye belang?"
Aa says, "It is, and she's teun a fit
Wi' tryin' te sing a bit sang"
He flung his arms aroond hor waist;
And trailed hor acroos the floor,
And Nan, poor sowl, like a dorty hoose cat,
Was tummelled oot-side o'the door.
There she wes lyin', byeth groanin' and cryin',
Te claim hor aa reely thowt shyem;
Aa tried for te lift hor, but aa cudden't shift hor,
Aa wished aa had Nanny at hyem.
The papor man said he wad give hor a ride,
So we lifted hor inti the trap:
But Nan was that tight, she cudden't sit up,
So we fasten'd hor doon wiv a strap;
She cudden't sit up, she wadden't lie doon,
She kicked till she broke the convaince:
She lost hor new basket, hor hat and hor shaal,
That mornin' wi lossin' the train.

=== Places mentioned ===
- Rowlands Gill is a village situated between Winlaton Mill and Blackhall Mill, on the north bank of the River Derwent, historically in County Durham but now in Gateshead, England

This is the only place mentioned by name. It is not known either where they started their journey, or where they intended to do their shopping, although Newcastle upon Tyne would be an educated guess as it is locallyreferredto as the toon.

- As Rowlands Gill was not a rail interchange, it has to be assumed that they travelled the first part of their journey by means other than rail.
- The Derwent Valley Railway was started in 1865 and the line was opened on 2 December 1867. The line (part single track) ran between Blackhill and Derwenthaugh on the River Tyne where it joined the Newcastle upon Tyne to Carlisle rail track.
- Even the name of the pubbilick hoose was not given.

== Recordings ==
- Alex Glasgow (1935–2001) was one of the North of England's most popular folk singers in his day. His CD entitled "Alex Glasgow - Songs Vol - now and then" recorded in 1970 (ref MWMCDSP21) included "Wor Nanny's a Mazer" together with 28 other titles
- Bob Fox and Benny Graham include the song on their album "How Are You Off For Coals?", along with several more of Tommy Armstrong's songs. (Fellside Records catalogue number FECD111)
- YouTube recording
- YouTube recording of

== See also ==
Geordie dialect words
