= Michael Heaviside =

English Victoria Cross recipient (1880-1939)

Michael Wilson Heaviside
- Born: 20 October 1880; Gilesgate, County Durham, England
- Died: 26 April 1939 (aged 58); St Thomas's Churchyard, Craghead, County Durham, England
- Military career
- Allegiance: United Kingdom
- Branch: British Army
- Rank: Private
- Units: Royal Army Medical Corps; Durham Light Infantry
- Conflicts: Second Boer War; World War I
- Awards: Victoria Cross

Michael Wilson Heaviside VC (20 October 1880 – 26 April 1939) was an English recipient of the Victoria Cross, the highest and most prestigious award for gallantry in the face of the enemy that can be awarded to British and Commonwealth forces.

== Early years ==
Heaviside was born in 1880 at Station Lane, Gilesgate in Durham where his father, John Wilson Heaviside, was a grocer. His paternal grandfather was the Durham-based photographer Thomas Heaviside (1828–1886). When Michael was still a boy, the family moved to Kimblesworh, where his father worked as head keeker and Michael went to the local municipal school. Later, the family moved to Sacriston, when his father transferred to the local pit.

Following the death of his mother, Annie, Michael enlisted - as 11796 Private Heaviside - in the Royal Army Medical Corps. He served as a stretcher bearer in South Africa during the Boer War and was awarded the Queen's and King's South African Medals, before he was invalided home suffering from enteric fever.

After he left the Regular Army, he transferred to the Army Reserve and began work underground at Burnhope Colliery. He met his future wife, Elizabeth, whilst living in Burnhope and they married at Lanchester. About 1913, he took work as a hewer at Oswald pit and the family moved to Craghead, near Stanley.

On 7 September 1914, with the First World War just a month old, 4/9720 Private Michael Heaviside re-enlisted, just one amongst the thousands of miners from County Durham who answered Kitchener's call. After training, he crossed to France in June 1915 and there settled into the deadly routine of trench warfare on the Western Front.

== Details ==
He was 36 years old, and a Private in the 15th Battalion, The Durham Light Infantry, British Army during the First World War at the Battle of Arras when the following deed took place for which he was awarded the VC.

On the evening of 5 May 1917, the battalion returned to their barricades on the Hindenburg Line, near Fontaine-les-Croisilles, France. Only one hundred yards separated the British and German positions but the terrible fighting of the preceding days had died down. Snipers and machine gunners were, however, still active and any movement attracted deadly fire. Then about 2 o’clock the next afternoon, 6 May 1917, a sentry noticed movement in a shell hole about forty yards from the German barricade. A wounded British soldier was desperately waving an empty water bottle. Any attempt to help this soldier in daylight would result in almost certain death for the rescuers. Michael Heaviside, however, said that he was going to try. Grabbing water and a first aid bag, the stretcher bearer scrambled over the barricade and out into no-man's-land. Immediately, he came under heavy rifle and machine gun fire from the German positions and was forced to throw himself to the ground. He then began to crawl sixty yards across the broken ground from shell hole to shell hole to where the wounded soldier was sheltering. One eyewitness later wrote -

"We could see bullets striking the ground right around the spot over which Heaviside was crawling. Every minute we expected to be his last but the brave chap went on". As he crawled closer to the German lines, the firing increased. -

"The enemy seemed to be more determined to hit him, for the bullets were spluttering about more viciously than ever".

When Private Heaviside reached the soldier, he found the man nearly demented with thirst for he had been lying badly wounded in the shell hole for four days and three nights, without any food or water. Michael Heaviside gave the soldier water, dressed his wounds and then promised that he would return with help. That night, Michael Heaviside led two other stretcher bearers out across no-man's-land to the wounded soldier and carried him back to safety. Without doubt, he had saved this man's life. The London Gazette announced the award of the Victoria Cross to Private Michael Heaviside on 8 June 1917 for his "most conspicuous bravery and devotion to duty". He was the third soldier of The Durham Light Infantry to gain this award during the First World War.

== Death ==
After the war, Michael Heaviside VC returned to work as a miner at Craghead. On 26 April 1939, he died at his home at Bloemfontein Terrace, aged just 58 years, his health damaged by his years underground and his time on the Western Front. Hundreds of mourners, many wearing their Great War medals, followed Michael Heaviside's coffin to St Thomas's Church, Craghead, as the local Colliery Band played the "Dead March in Saul". At the graveside, a firing party from the 8th Battalion DLI fired three volleys of shots, followed by the "Last Post" played by the battalion's buglers, then the mourners filed past, each dropping Flanders poppies into the open grave.

== The medal ==
On 12 July 1957, forty years after his "Welcome Home" parade through the streets of Stanley and Craghead, Michael Heaviside's Victoria Cross and other medals were presented by his family to The Durham Light Infantry's Regimental Museum. This presentation took place during a parade at Brancepeth Castle, when, watched by his mother and over thirty sons, daughters, grandchildren and other relatives of Michael Heaviside VC, Company Sergeant Major Norman Heaviside proudly handed over his father's medals.

The Victoria Cross was displayed at the Durham Light Infantry Museum and Durham Art Gallery. The D.L.I. Museum (now closed) was the official museum of the Durham Light Infantry. Located in Durham the museum housed an extensive array of artifacts and documentation detailing the regiment's history. It featured displays on World War I and World War II activities and exhibits included uniforms, weapons, medals, flags, hats, letters, photographs, badges, ceremonial regalia and many other items associated with the regiment. The museum was located on two floors, with the Durham Art Gallery on a third level. In October 2015 Durham County Council announced the closure of the D.L.I. Museum in a cost saving exercise. This decision sparked the formation of a campaign to save the museum led by John Richardson. The campaign attracted the attention and support of thousands of people from around the world, as well as County Durham itself, who appealed and protested at the County Councils proposed action. The campaign was unsuccessful and the museum closed in March 2016.

Durham Light Infantry (DLI) Collection is now based at Spennymoor. The address of the centre is; DCC DLI Collection, Sevenhills, Greenhills Business Park, Enterprise Way, Spennymoor, Co. Durham DL16 6JB. Tel. 03000 266 231 Details of the facility feature on the pages of the Durham County Council website.
