= Tanfield, County Durham =

Village near Stanley in County Durham, England

Tanfield
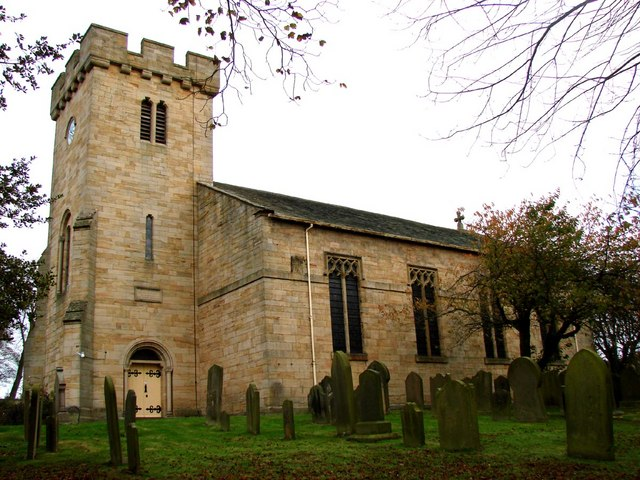
- St Margaret of Antioch's Church

- Location within County Durham
- Population: 8,270 (2011.Ward)
- OS grid reference: NZ191557
- Civil parish: Stanley
- Unitary authority: County Durham
- Ceremonial county: Durham
- Region: North East
- Country: England
- Sovereign state: United Kingdom
- Post town: Stanley
- Postcode district: DH9
- Dialling code: 01207
- Police: Durham
- Fire: County Durham and Darlington
- Ambulance: North East
- UK Parliament: North Durham

Tanfield is a village and former civil parish, now in the parish of Stanley, in the County Durham district, in the ceremonial county of Durham, England. It is near Stanley, and the location of Tanfield Railway, the Causey Arch and Tanfield School. The village was formerly a mining village.

== History ==
The village was first recorded in 1179 as Tamefeld, believed to be Old English for "field by the River Team", but it is mentioned in an account by John of Hexham of the Scottish invasion of 1138. The village church is from the 10th century.

=== Civil parish ===
Tanfield was formerly a chapelry, from 1866 Tanfield was a civil parish in its own right, on 1 April 1937 the parish was abolished and merged with Stanley, Consett and Lamesley. In 1931 the parish had a population of 9236.

== Economy ==
=== Collieries ===
In 1797, Frederick Eden in his 'State of the Poor' reported on the depressed state of the coal industry in Tanfield parish

- Tanfield Lea Colliery, Tanfield Lea. Closed 25 August 1962. Owners:- Lambton, Hetton & Joicey Collieries Ltd; (1947) NCB. Location:- (Sheet 88) NZ188544, 54°53′2″N 1°42′25″W, 7 miles (11 km) SW of Newcastle.
- Tanfield Moor Colliery, Tantobie. Opened before 1828. Closed Oct 1948. Owners:- Lambton, Hetton & Joicey Collieries Ltd. Location:- (Sheet 88) NZ169545, 54°53′6″N 1°44′12″W, 7.5 miles (12.1 km) SW of Newcastle.
- East Tanfield Colliery, Tantobie. Opened 1844. Closed January 1965. Owners: - James Joicey (from 1844), East Tanfield Colliery Co. Limited (from 1917), South Derwentside Coal Co. Limited (from 1929). National Coal Board (from 1947). Location: - (Sheet 88) NZ194552, 54°53′28″N 1°41′51″W, 6.5 miles (10.5 km) SW of Newcastle

The village has the highest rate of people aged 16–74 who have never worked, the figure stands at 33.33 percent, in the whole of England and Wales.

== Religious sites ==
The village church of St. Margaret of Antioch dates back to 900 AD, but the present structure was built in the 18th century. It was the parish church of Beamish Hall, former home to the Eden, Joicey and Shafto families. There is a Methodist church in Tanfield Lea.

== Notable people ==
Tanfield was the home of Tommy Armstrong (1848–1919), the "pit-man poet", whose grave is in the village cemetery.

== Sources ==
- Smailes, AE (1960). North England. Edinburgh: Thomas Nelson & Sons Ltd.
