= Causey (surname) =

Causey is a surname. Notable people with the surname include:

- Brian Causey, American guitarist and composer
- Jeff Causey (born 1971), American soccer goalkeeper
- John W. Causey (1841–1908), American farmer and politician
- Matthew Causey, American actor known for his role in the movie The Party Animal
- Peter F. Causey (1801–1871), American merchant and politician from Milford, Delaware
- Richard Causey (born 1960), Enron's Executive Vice President and Chief Accounting Officer during the Enron accounting scandal
- Thomas Causey (1949–2026), American sound engineer
- Wayne Causey (born 1936), American baseball infielder
- James Talarico (born 1989), American politician, born as James Causey before adoption
