= Tanfield School =

Coordinates: 54.877°N 1.707°W

Location
- Good Street; Stanley, County Durham, DH9 8AY; England

Information
- Type: Academy
- Motto: Hard Work, Trust, Fairness
- Established: 1912
- Local authority: Durham County Council
- Trust: Eden Learning Trust
- Department for Education URN: 147894 Tables
- Ofsted: Reports
- Headteacher: Steven Clough
- Gender: Coeducational
- Age: 11 to 16
- Enrolment: 710 (2024)
- Colours: Black, yellow and gold
- Website: https://www.tanfieldschool.co.uk/

Tanfield School is a coeducational secondary school in Stanley, County Durham, England, by the border to Tanfield Lea. The school is part of the Eden Learning Trust and is a specialist science and engineering college.

== History ==
Tanfield Lea Higher Elementary School and Pupil Teaching Centre was opened in October 1912. Some of the first pupils had transferred from the old Pupil Teacher Centre. However, most of the new intake were twelve years old.

Mr. Hardy, the first headmaster, recorded in the school log that: "The Pupil Teacher and Preparatory pupils attending the Tanfield Lea P.T. Centre (53 in number) and their teachers Mr. Stringer, Mr. Crabb, Miss Clough came to the school and 174 pupils were admitted by examination from 329 candidates". The object of the school, as stated in the 1914 prospectus, was to: "provide education, between the ages of 12 and 15 years, for children who, having previously attended an ordinary public elementary school, give sufficient promise of being able to take up an extended curriculum of such a character as is here provided, and whose parents intend them to remain until they are at least 15 years of age. The previous education of the pupils will be continued and widened and a practical training in special subjects added. The education given is indeed intended to afford, in an essentially practical manner, an intelligent preparation for the duties which will be undertaken when school days are over".

=== Grammar school ===
In 1919, the school was re-christened Alderman Wood School and took on grammar school status two years later. In 1945 its name was changed to Stanley Grammar School.

=== Comprehensive ===
In 1977, Tanfield Comprehensive was formed by the amalgamation of the existing school with Shield Row Secondary School. The school then had about 1,300 pupils and 76 teachers.

1986 saw another change with the phasing out of the Sixth Form and the opening of the Tertiary College at Consett.

11 May 1998 was 'The Great Fire of Tanfield' which led to the demolition of the Tower Block (the 1960s four-storey building used to house all the English, Maths and Science teaching areas). In November 2000, Ofsted inspectors commented, "The school has had to cope with very difficult working conditions following a major fire in May 1998, which resulted in the loss of 24 classrooms, school offices, resources, equipment and pupils' coursework".

=== Academy ===
Previously a community school administered by Durham County Council, in May 2020 Tanfield School converted to academy status. The school is now sponsored by the Eden Learning Trust.

== Notable former pupils ==
=== Stanley Grammar School ===
- John Caine (athlete), 10,000 m runner in the 1970 Commonwealth Games, later stadium manager of Gateshead International Stadium
- Fenwick Lawson, sculptor
- Colin Milburn, Northamptonshire cricketer
- Yvonne Ridley, journalist, author and film-maker

=== Tanfield School ===
- Carly Telford, England football goalkeeper
- Lewis Gibson, football player
- Lewis Miley, football player
- Darren Grimes, politician
