= Causey, County Durham =

Village in County Durham, England

Coordinates: 54.900°N 1.682°W

Causey
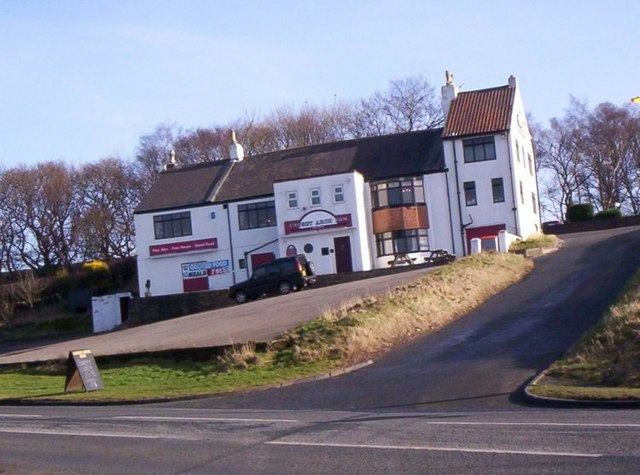
- Causey Arch Public House

- Location within County Durham
- OS grid reference: NZ204561
- Unitary authority: County Durham
- Ceremonial county: County Durham
- Region: North East
- Country: England
- Sovereign state: United Kingdom
- Post town: NEWCASTLE UPON TYNE
- Postcode district: NE16
- Police: Durham
- Fire: County Durham and Darlington
- Ambulance: North East

Causey is a village in County Durham, in England. It is situated a short distance to the north of Stanley.

== Demographic Information ==
Village contains at least 100 people, where 49% are male 52% are female.

== The Causey Arch ==
Around the Causey are a lot of ravines, valleys and denes, these are a relic of the ice age. The arch was built to cross one of these ravines. They had built a bridge of wood in 1725 which collapsed. A new bridge was built in 1726 which took more than a year to erect and cost over £6,000. The people who built it were known as the ‘Grand Alliance.’ They were Bowes ‘Ancestor to the Queen,’ Liddell and Wortleys. It was built to carry coal down to the Tyne at Dunston. It must be remembered that the locomotive had not been invented and no locomotive ever ran over it. The rails were made of wood, and the coal trucks were pulled by horses. The bridge had a span of over lOOft and is 8Oft above the stream and is about 23 ft wide. The Causey Arch is the oldest single span railway bridge in the world. In the 1930s the first thing told about the Arch was that it was built without a keystone, however, no one seems to remark on that now.

There were two cottages on the Tanfield side of the Arch. The children who went to the Causey School in the 1920s and 1930s were let out of school sooner in the dark nights as the bridge was unfenced. It has been used as a footpath since the coming of the locomotive and steel railway.

== See also ==
- Tanfield Railway
