= Causey Arch =

Bridge in County Durham, England

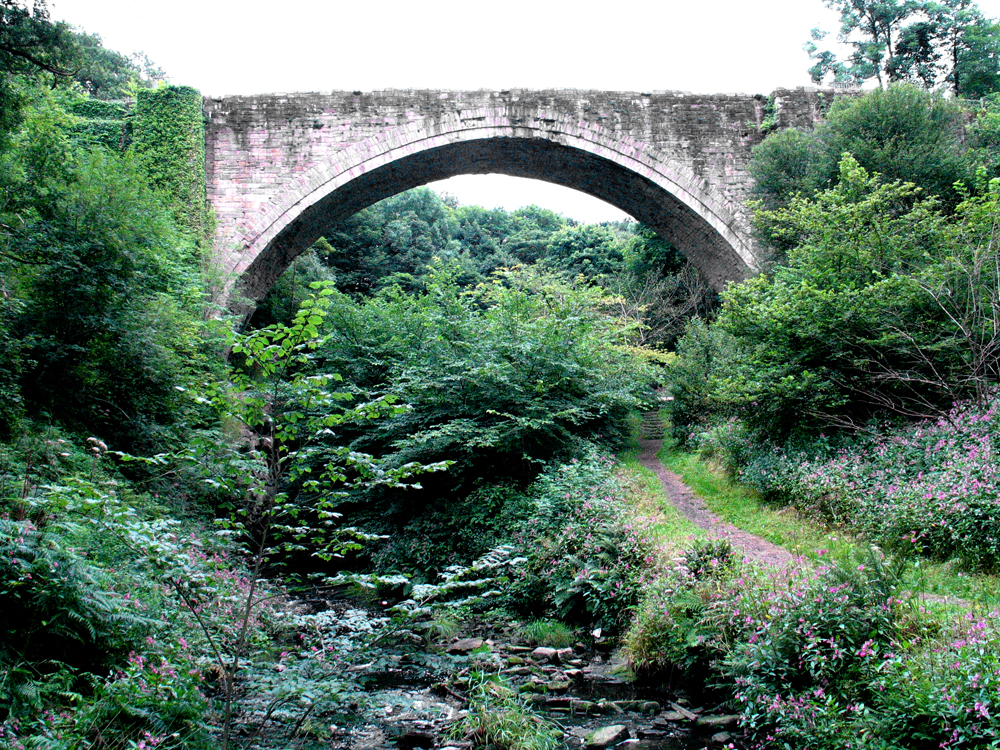
- North side of the bridge
- Coordinates: 54°53′51″N 1°41′15″W
- OS grid reference: NZ 20126 55896
- Carries: Waggonway (disused); footpath
- Crosses: Causey Burn
- Locale: Stanley, County Durham

Characteristics
- Design: Arch
- Material: Stone
- Total length: 105 ft (32 m)
- Height: 80 ft (24 m)
- No. of spans: 1

History
- Designer: Ralph Wood
- Opened: 1727

Statistics

Listed Building – Grade I
- Official name: CAUSEY ARCH
- Designated: 19 July 1950
- Reference no.: 1240816

The Causey Arch is a bridge near Stanley in County Durham, northern England. It is the oldest surviving single-arch railway bridge in the world, and a key element of the industrial heritage of England. It carried an early wagonway (horse-drawn carts on wooden rails) to transport coal. The line was later diverted, and no longer uses the bridge.

== History ==
Originally named Dawson's Bridge and associated with Dawson's Colliery, it was built in 1725–26 by stonemason Ralph Wood, funded by a coalition of coal-owners known as the "Grand Allies" (founded by Colonel Liddell, the Hon. Charles Montague and George Bowes the owner of Gibside Estate on which the bridge is situated) at a cost of £12,000.

When completed in 1726, it was the longest single-span bridge in the country with an arch span of 31 metres (102 ft), a record it held for thirty years until 1756 when the Old Bridge was built in Pontypridd, Wales. After he designed the bridge, Ralph Wood was so afraid that his arch would collapse that he committed suicide in 1727, but the bridge still stands today. An inscription on a sundial at the site reads "Ra. Wood, mason, 1727".

Two tracks crossed the Arch: one (the "main way") to take coal to the River Tyne, and the other (the "bye way") for returning the empty wagons. Over 900 horse-drawn wagons crossed the arch each day using the Tanfield Railway.

Use of the arch declined when Tanfield Colliery was destroyed by fire in 1739.

== Present status ==
The Arch has been Grade I listed since 1950. It was restored and reinforced in the 1980s. There are a series of scenic public paths around the area and the Causey Burn which runs underneath it. The quarry near the bridge is a popular spot for local rock climbers.

Causey Burn itself flows into Beamish Burn which then flows into the River Team, eventually discharging into the River Tyne.

== See also ==
- Brandling Junction Railway
