= River Team =

River in North East England

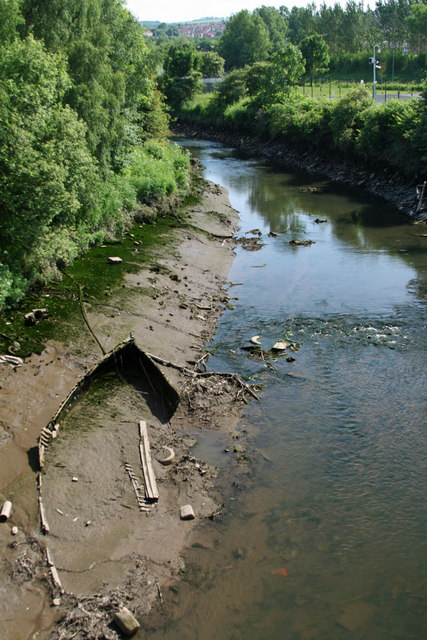
- River Team near Gateshead

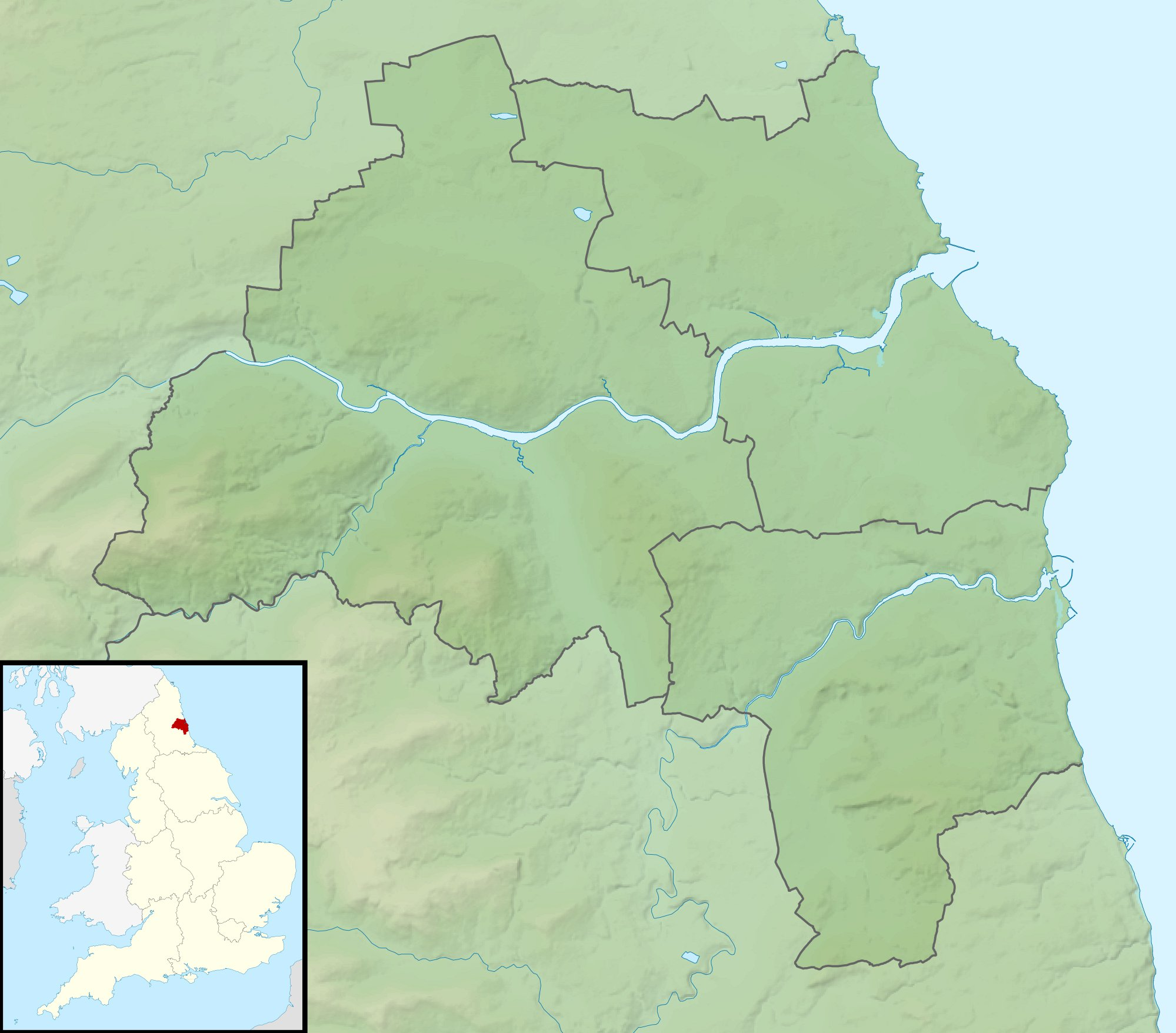
- Location of mouth within Tyne and Wear

Location
- Country: United Kingdom
- Country within the UK: England
- Counties: Tyne and Wear; County Durham
- Towns: Gateshead

Physical characteristics
- Mouth
  - location: Confluence with the River Tyne, Dunston, Tyne and Wear
  - coordinates: 54°57′28″N 1°38′14″W

Basin features
- Tributaries
  - left: Black Burn, Lady Park Burn, Strandy Burn, Coltspool Burn, Small Waters, Red Burn, Bobgins Burn, Carrmyers Burn
  - right: Allerdene Burn, Leyholdburn Gill, Rowletch Burn, Letch Burn

The River Team is a tributary of the River Tyne in Gateshead, England.

The minor tributaries of the River Team include Strandy Burn, Coltspool Burn, Rowletch Burn, Red Burn, Letch Burn, Bobgins Burn, Farleith Burn, and Carrmyers Burn. The Black Burn is also a tributary, albeit culverted at its confluence with the Team, and it flows by Watergate Park, and rises at Sunniside.

== Etymology ==
The name Team may have a Brittonic origin. The name may be from the Brittonic root tā-, with a sense of "melting, thawing, dissolving", plus a nasal root determinative, giving a form of *tā-m- or *tā-n-. However, Team has also been associated with the Indo-European *temhx-, "dark" and *tṃh-, "cut" or "be cut".

== Course ==
Its source is near Annfield Plain, where it is known as Kyo Burn. Briefly known as Houghwell Burn, it then changes its name again to Causey Burn as it flows underneath the famous Causey Arch. It then flows past Beamish Museum in County Durham (where it is known as Beamish Burn) then crosses the border into Gateshead flowing through Lamesley. Continuing on into the Team Valley, the river flows through a culvert in the middle of the roundabout underneath the A1 road, it then continues through the Team Valley Trading Estate through a covered culvert, before emerging to the surface halfway along.

It then flows through the site of the 1990 National Garden Festival, before finally discharging into the River Tyne in Dunston. This area is known as Teams, after the river. At the mouth is the Dunston Staiths.

== Pollution ==
The River Team has long been regarded as one of the most polluted rivers in the area due to the discharges from Sewage works near Lamesley and heavy industry in the Team Valley. It is called "The Gut" by the residents of Dunston. However considerable improvements have now been made and the river is relatively clean.

=== Water quality ===
The Environment Agency measure water quality of the river systems in England. Each is given an overall ecological status, which may be one of five levels: high, good, moderate, poor and bad. There are several components that are used to determine this, including biological status, which looks at the quantity and varieties of invertebrates, angiosperms and fish. Chemical status, which compares the concentrations of various chemicals against known safe concentrations, is rated good or fail.

Water quality of the River Team in 2019:

Section	Ecological Status	Chemical Status	Length	Catchment	Channel
Team from Source to Tyne	Moderate	Fail	23.158 km (14.390 mi)	85.064 km^{2} (32.843 sq mi)	Heavily modified

== Geology ==
Prior to the last ice age, the lower part of the River Team actually formed the lower part of the River Wear, with a combined Tyne-Wear river continuing to the coast from Dunston. The ice diverted the River Wear to its current course towards the coast at Sunderland, with the smaller River Team flowing along its former course towards the River Tyne.
