= Tanfield Lea =

Village in County Durham, England

Coordinates: 54.880°N 1.710°W

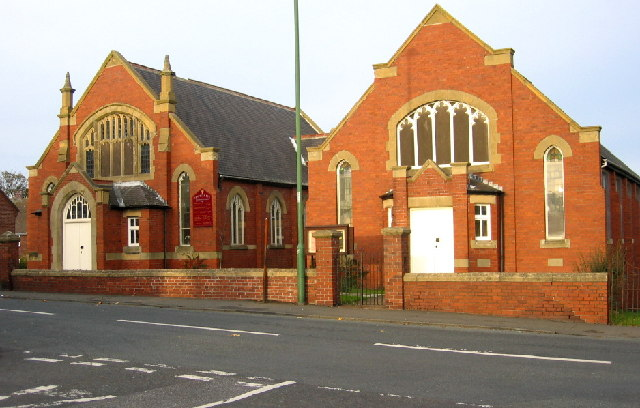
- Methodist Church and Hall

- Location within County Durham
- OS grid reference: NZ186539
- Unitary authority: County Durham
- Ceremonial county: County Durham
- Region: North East
- Country: England
- Sovereign state: United Kingdom
- Post town: DURHAM
- Postcode district: DH9
- Police: Durham
- Fire: County Durham and Darlington
- Ambulance: North East

Tanfield Lea is a village north of Stanley, County Durham, England, and south of Tantobie.

== Religious sites ==
There is a Methodist Church, which also has a village hall.

== Industry ==
The Ever Ready battery company used to be a major employer in the local area, employing over a thousand workers at its peak. The Tanfield Lea factory was closed in 1996, following the take over of British Ever Ready by the American company Ralston Purina in 1992.
