= Tantobie =

Coordinates: 54.8907°N 1.7179°W

- Location within County Durham
- OS grid reference: NZ181551
- Unitary authority: County Durham
- Ceremonial county: County Durham
- Region: North East
- Country: England
- Sovereign state: United Kingdom
- Post town: STANLEY
- Postcode district: DH9
- Dialling code: 01207
- Police: Durham
- Fire: County Durham and Darlington
- Ambulance: North East
- UK Parliament: North Durham

Tantobie is a former colliery village in County Durham, England. It is situated 2 miles to the northwest of Stanley and the same distance to the north of Annfield Plain. Older maps of the area show the village under the name "Tantovy" and "Tantoby". The etymology is doubtful: it looks as if it ends in Old Norse by "village", "farm", like Lockerbie and Formby, but the meaning is uncertain.

To the east is a small housing estate named 'Sleepy Valley', which is close to the village of Tanfield.

== Notable people ==
See Category:People from Tantobie
