= Craghead =

Village in County Durham, England

Coordinates: 54°51′N 1°40′W

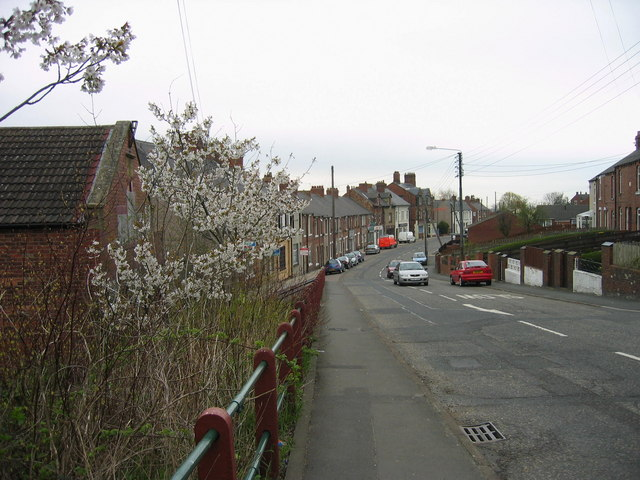
- Edward Street

- Location within County Durham
- Civil parish: Stanley
- Unitary authority: County Durham
- Ceremonial county: Durham
- Region: North East
- Country: England
- Sovereign state: United Kingdom
- Post town: STANLEY
- Postcode district: DH9
- Dialling code: 01207

Craghead is a village and former civil parish, now in the parish of Stanley, in the County Durham district, in the ceremonial county of Durham, England. A former mining village, it is located at the bottom of the valley to the south of Stanley, on the main road between Stanley and Durham, and not far from the village of Edmondsley. In 1931, the parish had a population of 4,973. From 1869, Craghead was a civil parish in its own right. On 1 April 1937, the parish was abolished and merged with Stanley and Lanchester.

In 1938, Craghead was the subject of a BBC radio programme called Coal. The closure of the coal mine in 1969 featured in a BBC Two TV documentary programme in the A Year in the Life series, and the village featured in a follow-up programme in the A Year in the life: Twenty Years On series in 1990.

The village still has some reminders of its industrial past, including a colliery brass band. Craghead United F.C., a defunct association football club, was based here.

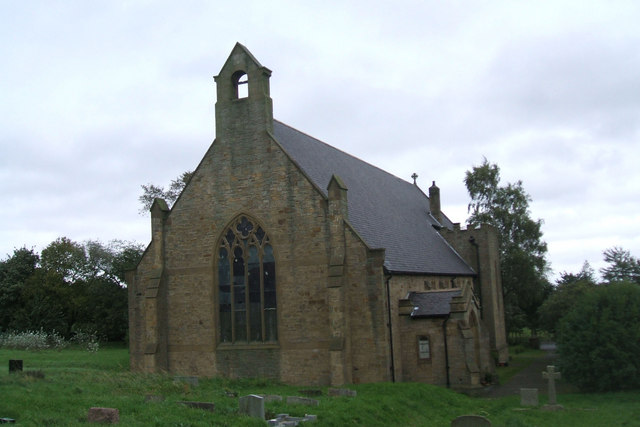
St Thomas' Church

Public houses in Craghead include the Punch Bowl. Craghead is also well known for its wind farm, with two wind turbines on a hill known as the Craghead Windmills.
