= Daisy Edis =

- Born: 1887; Durham, UK
- Died: March 1, 1964
- Occupation: Photographer
- Organization(s): Royal Photographic Society, British Institute of Professional Photography, Durham Photographic Society

Daisy Emma Edis FRPS FIBP (12 October 1887 – 1 March 1964; married name Spence) was a photographer based in Durham, UK. She is commemorated by a blue plaque at her former home in Gilesgate as a "pioneering Durham professional photographer".

== Career ==
Edis began working in the photography studio founded by her father, John Reed Edis, as a teenager in 1901, and continued the business alone after his death in 1942 until her own death in 1964.

Edis was a specialist in portrait photography but also became well known for photography for Durham Cathedral, Durham University, and Durham School; she was one of the last photographers to use the platinum print process, and her work was exhibited in Europe, the US, Australia and Japan as well as in the UK. She became an Ordinary Member and then an Associate Member of the Royal Photographic Society in 1933, and a Fellow in 1935; she was also a Fellow of the British Institute of Professional Photography, and a founding member of the Durham Photographic Society in the 1940s.

Edis' married name was Spence, but her husband died only a few years after their marriage and she continued to use her maiden name professionally.

== Legacy ==
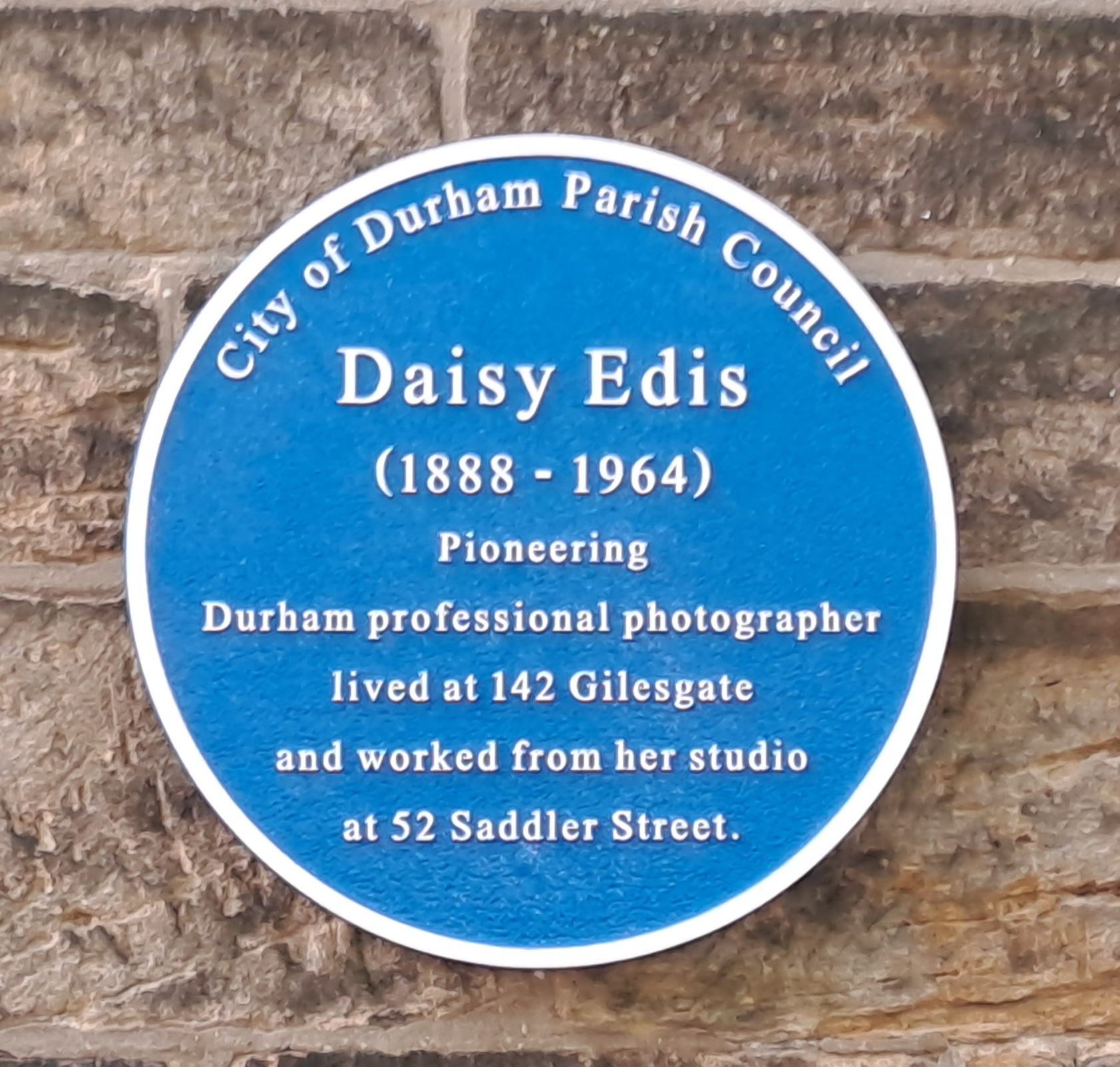
Blue plaque commemorating Daisy Edis

Collections of photographs taken by Daisy and John Edis are held by Durham University and Beamish Museum. Beamish also has a replica photography studio, JR & D Edis Photographers, which is based on the Edis' studio at 52 Saddler Street, Durham and includes objects from the original studio.

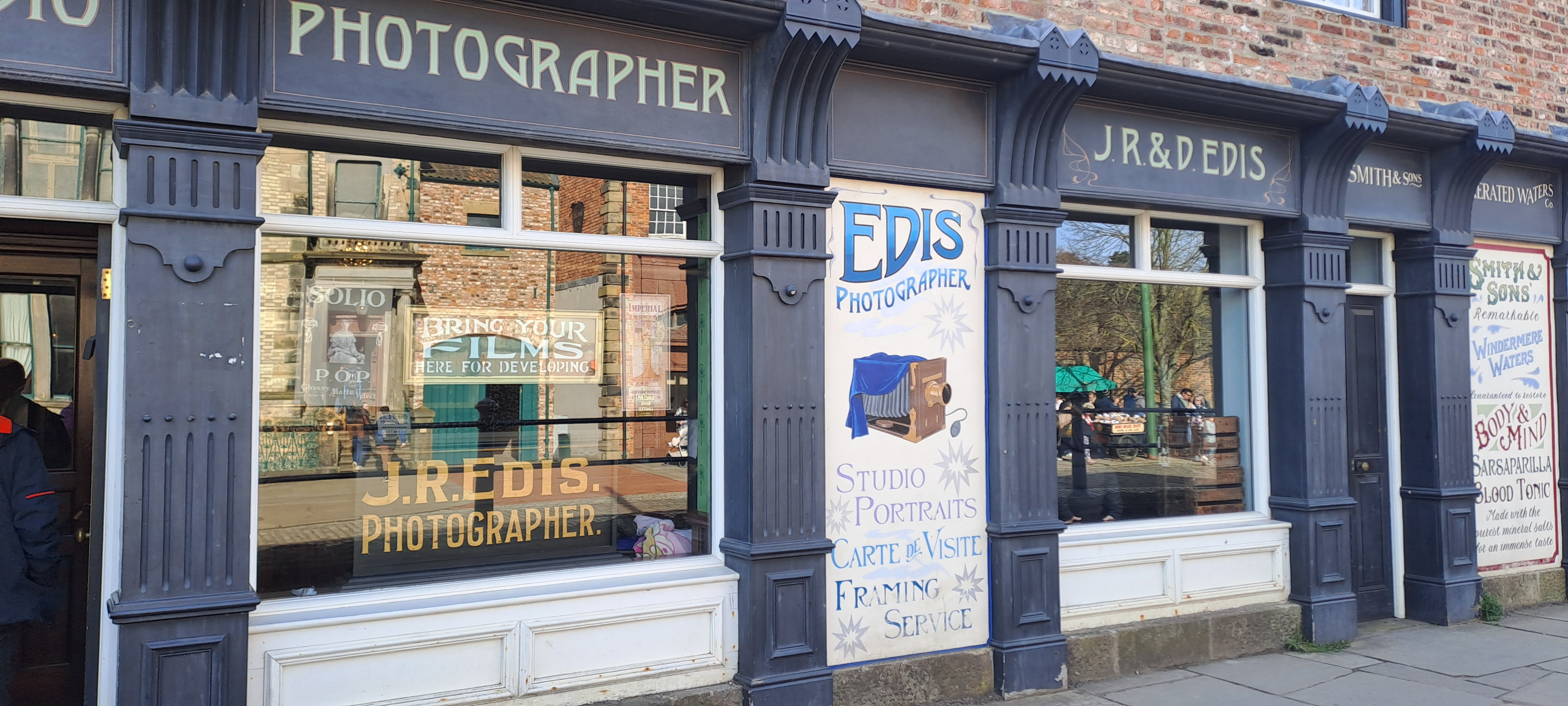
Replica of John R and Daisy Edis' Durham photography studio

The blue plaque commemorating Edis was installed by the City of Durham Parish Council at her former home at 142 Gilesgate, Durham, in 2022. The date of birth on the plaque is incorrect. Daisy was born on 12 October 1887 in Darlington, County Durham.
