= Joseph Hedley =

English quilter and murder victim (died 1826)

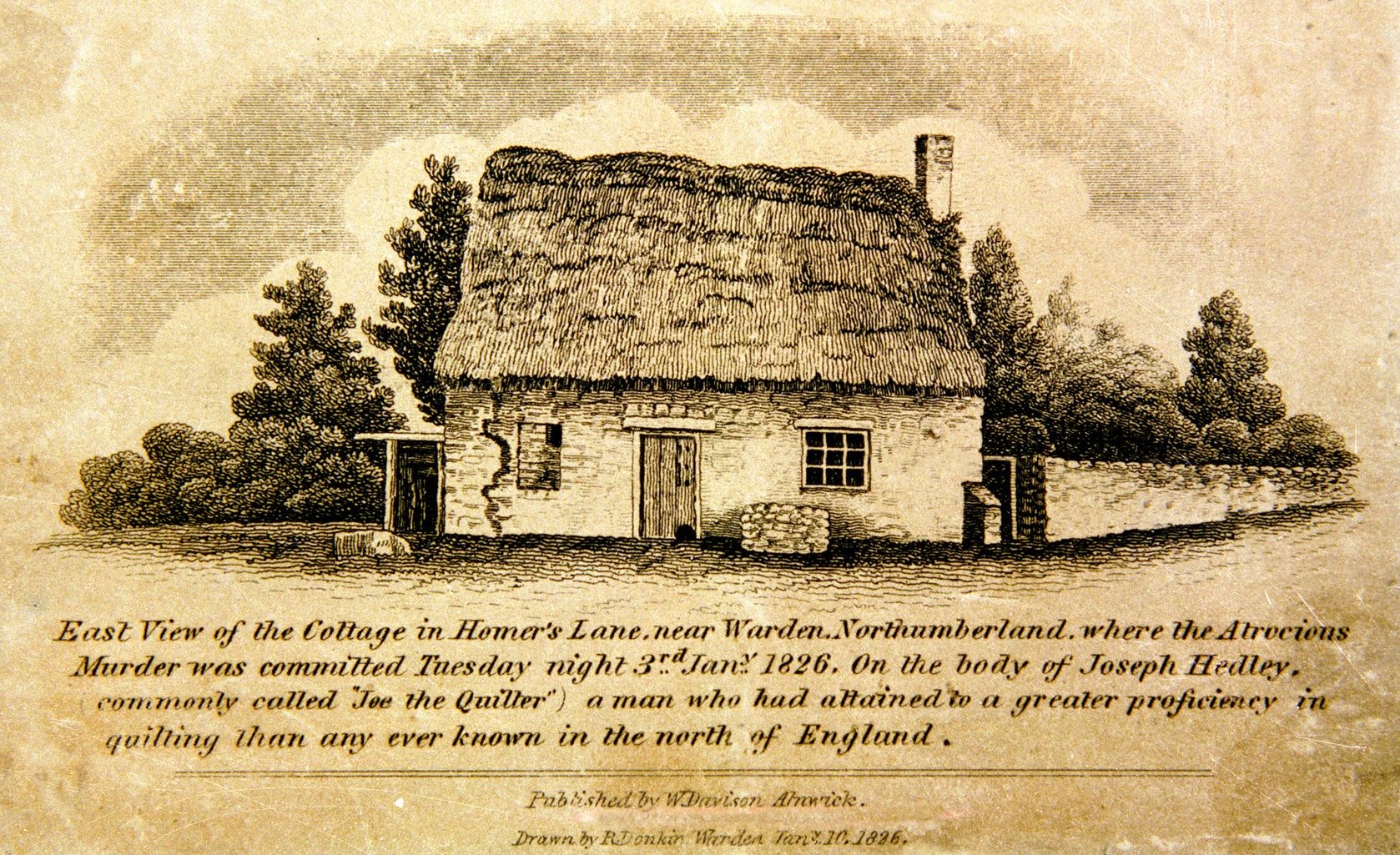
An 1826 postcard showing an illustration of "Joe the Quilter's" Cottage, Homers house.

Joseph Hedley (also known as Joe the Quilter, 1749 or 1750 – 3 January 1826) was a quilter from Northumberland. During his life, he was renowned for his quality of craftsmanship, with his work being exported as far as America. He lived his later years on parish relief. His life was widely recorded in newspapers across the country and is most remembered due to his brutal murder, which occurred on 3 January 1826. His murderers were not found despite a large reward being offered, and the culprits remain unknown.

== Life ==
Joseph Hedley was born at some point in 1749 or 1750 in Northumberland. Little is known about his early life except what scant information is given in his obituaries, which are more interested in contrasting the peacefulness of his late life with his grisly murder. It is known that he trained as a tailor, probably taking an apprenticeship in the craft. However, for an unknown reason, he gave up the craft for that of Quilt making.

"His quilts with country fame was crowned,
"So neatly stitched, and all the ground
"Adorned with flowers or figured round."

— A. B. Wright, Section of a contemporary ballad

While much of the nation's quilting industry was in decline during the second half of the 18th century, in part due to the Industrial Revolution, Northumberland quilters in general and Joe the Quilter in particular managed to buck this trend. During his life he was known as a highly skilled craftsman, designing and quilting in both linen and cotton, with extremely fine details executed down to a quarter of an inch. Many of his designs show a propensity towards flowers, chains and diamond shapes, becoming especially associated with a pattern known as 'Old Joe's chain'. Such was his reputation that he created quilts for customers as far away as America and Ireland.

In 1773, at the age of 23, Hedley married Isabel Thompson, a woman 25 years his elder, and moved into a typical 2 roomed 'squatter' cottage in Warden Parish, called "Homer's House". The cottage was on the road between Warden church and Chollerford, overlooking the Tyne. The Hedleys kept a small garden, containing vegetables and herbs and had kept a variety of animals. As Isabel aged, Joseph spent many of his prime years caring for her and when she died he was left almost destitute. He was generally well-liked by the local community but his seclusion made him liable with it being reported that he would have starved during a severe snowstorm in 1823, had it not been for a Hexham clergyman wading through snow drifts to bring him food when other attempts to reach him had failed.

== Murder ==
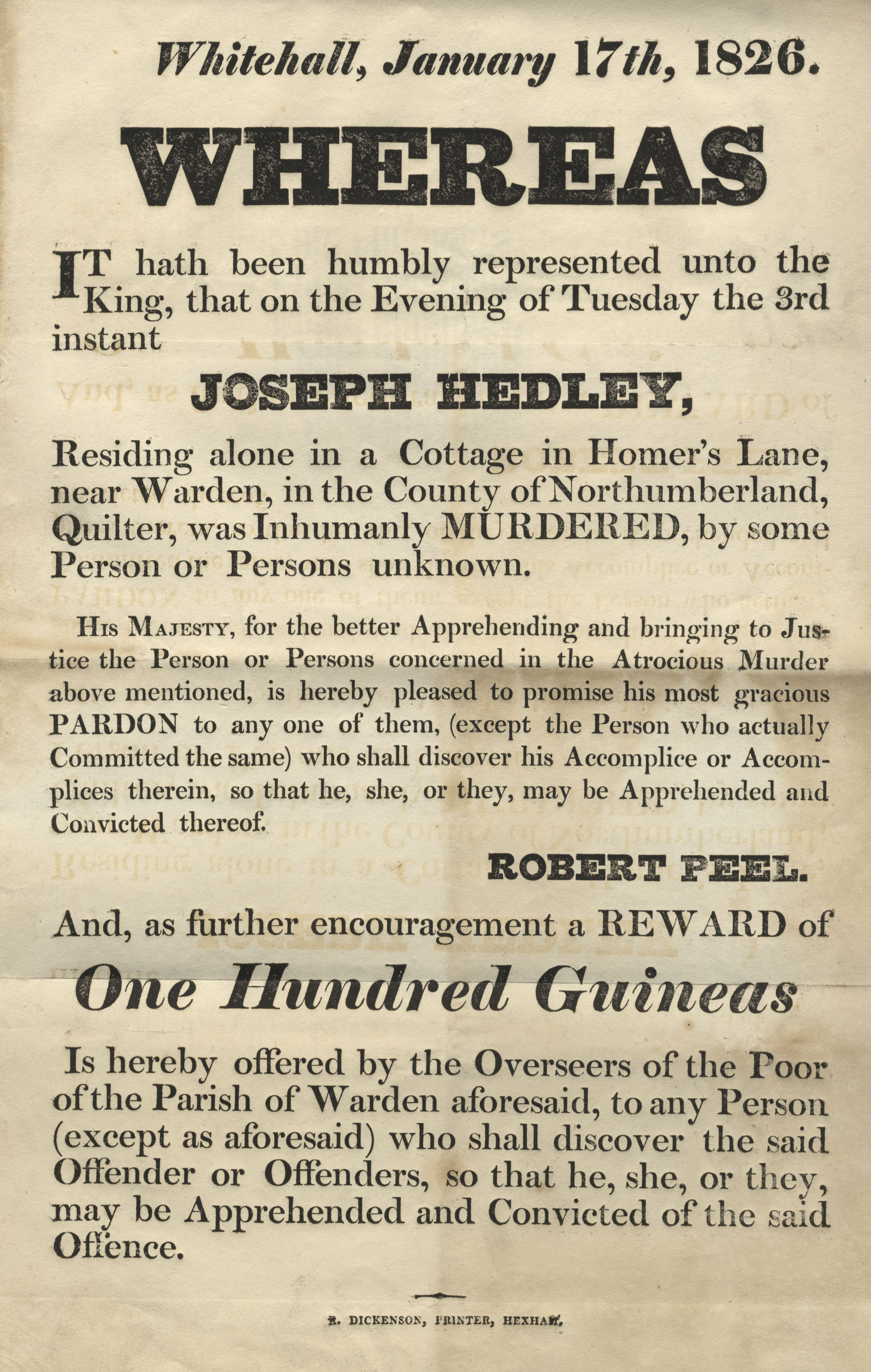
Reward notice, signed in the name of Robert Peel, offering a reward of 100 guineas for evidence in the case.

On the evening of Thursday, 3 January 1826 he was murdered in his home by an unknown attacker. Hedley was 76 years old. That afternoon he had been at Walwick Grange and had received charitable aid from the farmer there. During the evening a variety of visitors called on him and all recall him being in good health, with the last person to see him alive being a peddler (Note: The peddlers of Northumberland would have been well known to Hedley as they were the primary way that craftsmen such as him would have bought their materials, with cloth peddlers calling into individual farms. Such traders were still working in Northumberland into the 20th Century.) from Stamfordham asking for directions. An hour later when a Mr. Smith of Haughton Castle rode past he noted Joe's cottage was dark and silent. Despite passers-by and herdsman noting the strangeness of the cottage being locked up and silent over the next few days, it wasn't until the Saturday that further inquiry was undertaken.

On the afternoon of the 7th alarmed neighbours burst open the locked door to Hedley's home. His body was found in a small inner room with more than 40 wounds inflicted to his face and neck. There seemed to have been a struggle outside the cottage as his clogs and some scraps of cloth were discovered on the other side of the road, with some at the time theorising this showed that Hedley had been attempting to flee to the nearest residence, Wall Mill. (Note: Wall Mill was about a quarter of a mile from Homers House) There were also signs of struggle inside the cottage and several garden tools were suspected to have been used as murder weapons by those at the scene.

Little motive could be discerned for such a violent act. The only possible explanation seems to be that his murderers believed rumours that Hedley had some secret fortune despite the fact that Joe was known to be receiving parish aid. This interpretation is backed up by the fact that the perpetrators appear to have rummaged through the old man's drawers, evidently in search of something. On the other hand, Robert Hill argues that personal motive should be considered because of details such as the clock face being smashed, something he points out would not have been done in the struggle and instead a purposeful attack against Hedley's identity. (Note: During this period clocks were expensive items, often family heirlooms and therefore were "part of a person 'display'") He proposes as a possibility for the murderer a neighbour named William Herdman who had been an early suspect. However, he was discounted by contemporaries because he was, in the words of The Newcastle Chronicle, "a poor and simple creature of rather imbecile intellect".

A 100 guineas reward was put up by the local parish and a full pardon was promised by Robert Peel for any accomplice who came forward. Despite this, all efforts to find the culprits came to nought. Several arrests were made in the immediate aftermath but no one was prosecuted, and from time to time afterwards, purported confessions were made but all have been discounted as fabrications.

== Legacy ==
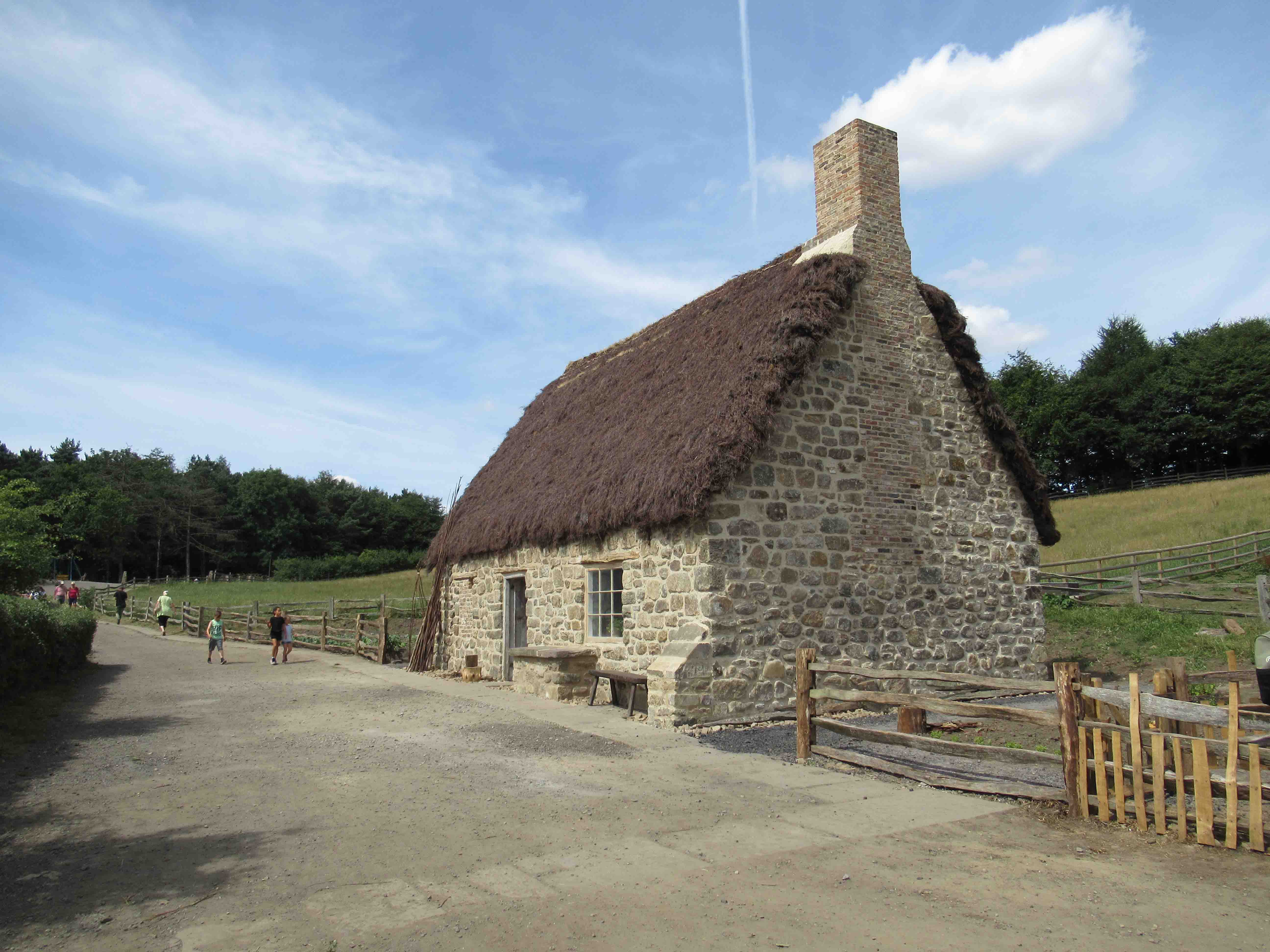
The recreation of Joe the Quilter's cottage at Beamish Museum

The life and death of Joe the Quilter was remembered in a contemporary elegiac ballad by A. B. Wright of the Hexham theatre. The song inspired the Richard Dawson song "Joe The Quilt Maker" from his album Glass Trunk. Because of the brutality of his death and subsequent reaction in newspapers around the country, a lot more is recorded about Joseph Hedley's life and living conditions than is usual for a person of his social standing in the Georgian era.

Hedley's cottage was demolished in 1872 and its location was forgotten until archaeologists led by the Beamish Museum, using an 1826 postcard and old maps of the area, excavated the site. The dig uncovered the cottage's walls, fireplace, flagstones and smaller items such as pottery and a silver groat coin. The museum used a floor plan, along with 10 tonnes of material removed from the site, and information from the time to reconstruct the cottage, opening it to visitors in 2018.
