= British Institute of Professional Photography =

Professional photographers' organisation in the United Kingdom

- Abbreviation: BIPP
- Formation: March 28, 1901; 125 years ago
- Founded at: Fleet Street, London
- Type: Non-profit, Professional association
- Legal status: Active
- Professional title: FBIPP, ABIPP, LBIPP
- Headquarters: United Kingdom
- Region served: United Kingdom (and international)
- Members: 500+
- President: Jeff Brown
- Main organ: Membership Services Advisory Board (MSAB)
- Website: www.bipp.com
- Formerly called: The Professional Photographers' Association; Institute of Incorporated Photographers

The British Institute of Professional Photography (BIPP) is a not-for-profit organisation for professional photographers in the United Kingdom. Members must be qualified professionals, and agree to be bound by the BIPP's code of conduct.

The institute was formed as The Professional Photographers' Association on 28 March 1901, at a meeting at a hotel in Fleet Street, and has since changed its name three times, including Institute of Incorporated Photographers. From 100 members at its outset, the institute now has over 500 members. Members can become qualified at three different levels as assessed by the BIPP, with the highest being Fellowship (FBIPP).

The current President of the British Institute of Professional Photography is Jeff Brown.

== Competitions and Awards ==
The BIPP runs regional competitions in the U.K, as well as participating in international competitions. The British Professional Photography Awards are a combined photography award run by the Master Photographers Association and the British Institute of Professional Photography.

The 2023 Photography Print Competition was won by Graeme Hewitson.

The 2022 Photography Print Competition was won by Su Kaye for her dog portrait titled "Things Are Looking Up".

== Controversy ==
A photograph of a London Black Lives Matter protest, initially posted on the BIPP Instagram page, was removed after criticism that it was 'racially insensitive'.

== Organisational structure ==
The Membership Services Advisory Board (MSAB) is made up of members put forward by their respective regions. The MSAB is also responsible for choosing the board of directors.
