= Low Westwood =

Village in County Durham, England

Coordinates: 54.903°N 1.824°W

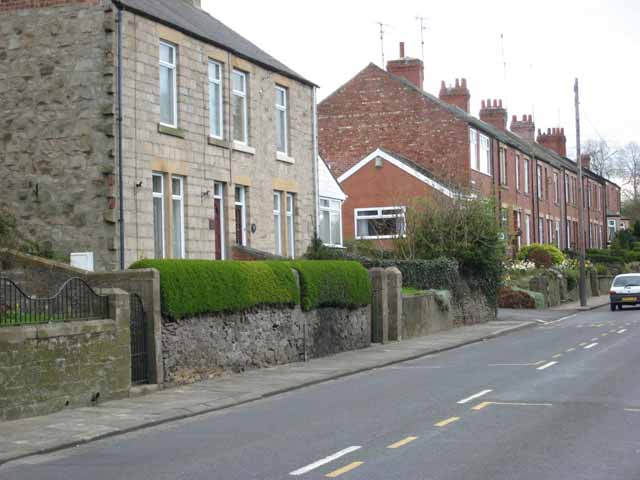
Sherburn Terrace

Low Westwood is a village in County Durham, England. It is situated immediately to the west of Hamsterley. Low Westwood is probably best known for Hamsterley Christ Church and Derwent care home.

Low Westwood grew as a result of coal mining. Westwood Colliery, located on the Shotley Bridge to Newcastle road, was operational from the 1840s (appearing on the 1856 Ordnance Survey map Durham sheet V). By the 1870s the original colliery had been replaced by the High Westwood colliery.

By the 1890s there was housing for the miners as well as a Church Of England church, Christ Church. A Roman Catholic church, dedicated to the Sacred Heart, was established in 1898 and closed in 1998. A school (1898) and cemetery, associated with the church, were also established.

The Derwent Valley Railway served the village from 1868 until the closure of High Westwood station in 1942.

== Geography ==
The River Derwent flows at the bottom of the valley, and separates the nearby villages of Blackhall Mill and Chopwell. Although situated in County Durham, Low Westwood has a Newcastle-upon-Tyne postcode (NE17). Low Westwood is approximately 800 yards (730 m) from the village of Ebchester, built on the site of the Roman fort of Vindomora.

== Transport ==
Low Westwood lies just off the A694, and is on the 'Red kite' (45/46) Go North East bus route which runs from Consett to Newcastle upon Tyne. There are also regular bus links to Chopwell, and a free Tesco bus which runs once or twice a day between Chopwell and the Delve's Lane Tesco.

Low Westwood lies just off the Derwent Cycle Path, which runs from Consett to Gateshead.

== Nightlife ==
Low Westwood and Hamsterley had one pub between them, The Cronniewell, a popular pub/nightclub. This has recently closed and is now an Italian restaurant. There are two pubs in Ebchester about 15 minutes' walk away.

== Economy ==
Low Westwood saw a huge economic boom in the late 19th century, with the establishment of many of its residential properties, built with a yellow grey Durham stone, iconic of the area. These are typical of thriving North Durham villages. Many newer houses, flats and apartments have been built within a mile radius in the style of these houses, an appreciation of the golden age of the late 19th Century.

The town benefits from local employment in larger nearby towns, such as Consett and Rowlands Gill.
