= High Westwood railway station =

Disused railway station in High Westwood, County Durham

High Westwood
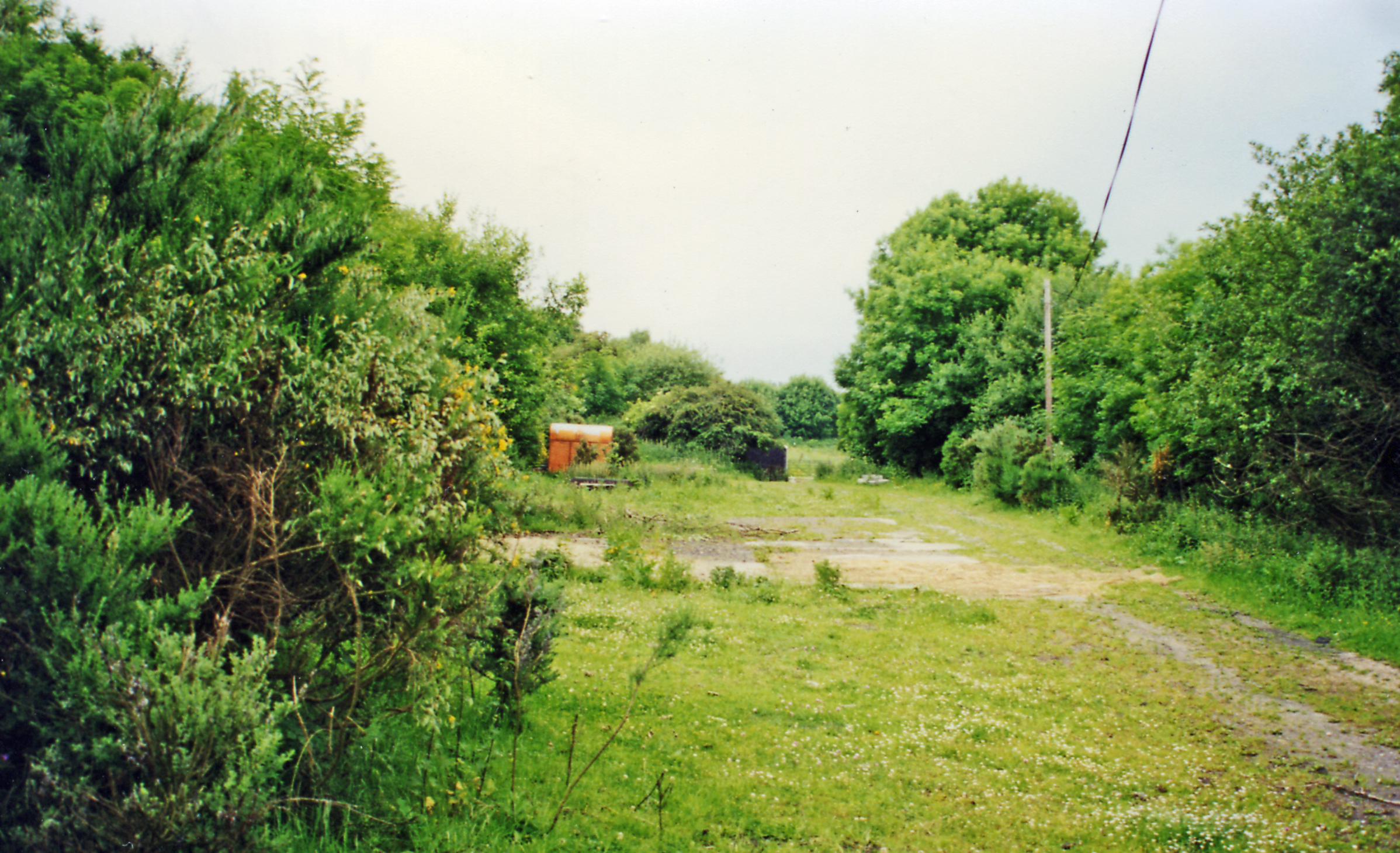
- The site of the station, looking west towards Blackhall, in 2000

General information
- Location: High Westwood, County Durham; England
- Coordinates: 54.8992°N 1.8214°W
- Grid reference: NZ115560
- Platforms: 2

Other information
- Status: Disused

History
- Original company: North Eastern Railway
- Post-grouping: LNER

Key dates
- 1 July 1909: Opened
- 4 May 1942: Closed to passengers
- 11 November 1963: Closed to goods
Location

High Westwood railway station served the village of High Westwood, County Durham, England from 1909 to 1942 on the Derwent Valley Railway.

== History ==
The station opened on 1 July 1909 by the North Eastern Railway. The station was situated at the end of a track running from Derwent Crescent. The platforms were made of timber and it was on a hill above the village. The station was the first on the line to close; it closed to passengers on 4 May 1942 while the other stations survived and closed to goods traffic on 11 November 1963.

Preceding station	Disused railways	Following station
Lintz Green; Line and station closed	North Eastern Railway; Derwent Valley Railway	Ebchester; Line and station closed
