= Rowlands Gill railway station =

Disused railway station in Rowlands Gill, Tyne and Wear

Rowlands Gill
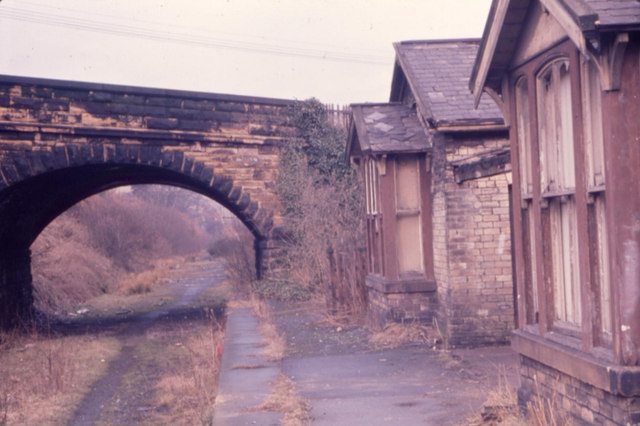
- The station after closure and lifting of the tracks

General information
- Location: Rowlands Gill, Tyne and Wear; England
- Coordinates: 54.9201°N 1.7406°W
- Grid reference: NZ167584
- Platforms: 2

Other information
- Status: Disused

History
- Original company: North Eastern Railway
- Pre-grouping: North Eastern Railway
- Post-grouping: LNER; British Railways (North Eastern)

Key dates
- 2 December 1867: Opened
- 1 February 1954: Closed to passengers
- 11 November 1963: Closed completely
Location

Rowlands Gill railway station served the village of Rowlands Gill, Tyne and Wear, England from 1867 to 1963 on the Derwent Valley Railway.

== History ==
The station was opened on 2 December 1867 by the North Eastern Railway. It was situated on the south side of Station Road. The goods traffic was timber, bricks and coal to Newcastle and iron ore to Consett. Due to passenger numbers failing to recover after the Second World War, the station was closed on 1 February 1954 to passengers and closed completely along with the line on 11 November 1963.

The station master's house is the only remaining building from the station.

Preceding station	Disused railways	Following station
Swalwell; Line and station closed	North Eastern Railway; Derwent Valley Railway	Lintz Green; Line and station closed
