= Ebchester railway station =

Disused railway station in Ebchester, County Durham

Ebchester
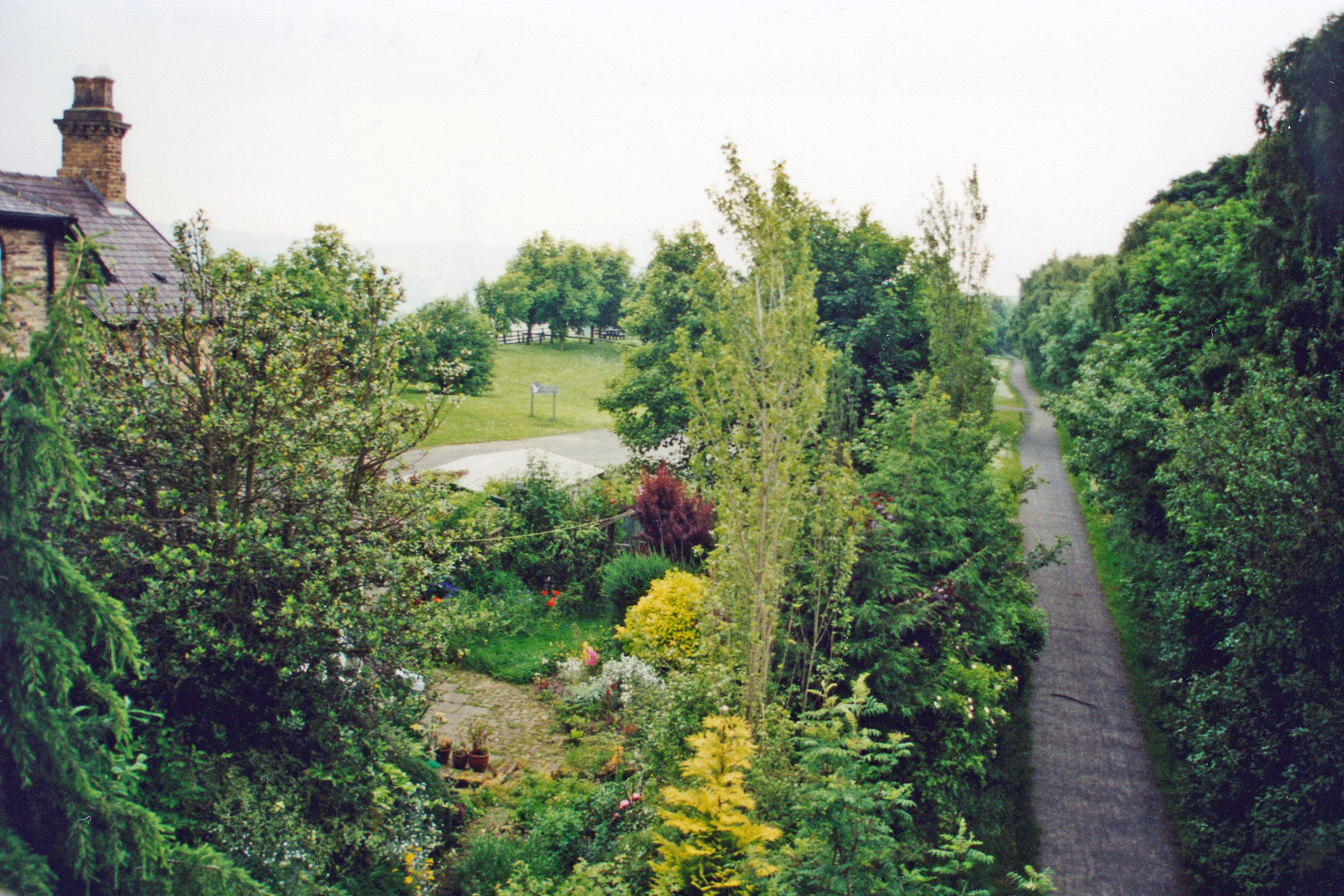
- The site of the station, looking northeast towards Newcastle, in 2000

General information
- Location: Ebchester, County Durham; England
- Coordinates: 54.8879°N 1.835°W
- Grid reference: NZ106548
- Platforms: 2

Other information
- Status: Disused

History
- Original company: North Eastern Railway
- Post-grouping: LNER; British Railways (North Eastern)

Key dates
- 2 December 1867: Opened
- 21 September 1953: Closed to passengers
- 11 November 1963: Closed to goods
Location

Ebchester railway station served the village of Ebchester, County Durham, England from 1867 to 1963 on the Derwent Valley Railway.

== History ==
The station opened on 2 December 1867 by the North Eastern Railway. It was situated on the east side of Ebchester Hill on the B6309. The site of the station had a large station yard and worker's cottages. It closed to passengers on 21 September 1953. and to goods traffic on 11 November 1963.

Preceding station	Disused railways	Following station
High Westwood; Line and station closed	North Eastern Railway; Derwent Valley Railway	Shotley Bridge; Line and station closed
