= Shotley Bridge railway station =

Disused railway station in Shotley Bridge, County Durham

Shotley Bridge
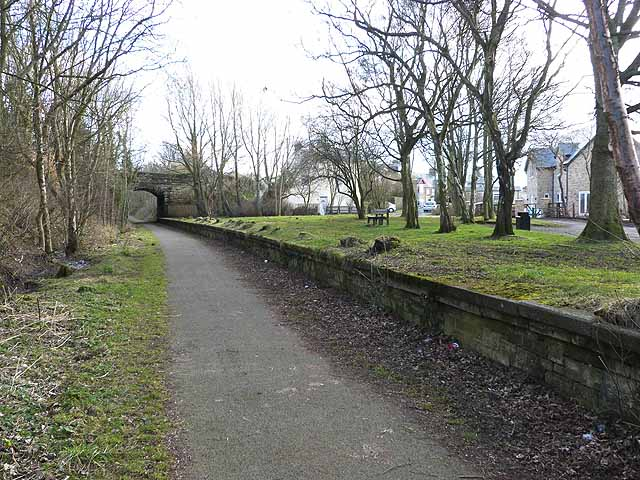
- The site of the station in 2014

General information
- Location: Shotley Bridge, County Durham; England
- Coordinates: 54.8755°N 1.8416°W
- Grid reference: NZ102534
- Platforms: 1

Other information
- Status: Disused

History
- Original company: North Eastern Railway
- Post-grouping: LNER; British Railways (North Eastern)

Key dates
- 2 December 1867: Opened
- 21 September 1953: Closed
Location

Shotley Bridge railway station served the village of Shotley Bridge, County Durham, England from 1867 to 1953 on the Derwent Valley Railway.

== History ==
The station opened on 2 December 1867 by the North Eastern Railway. It was situated on the north side of the B6310. Nearby were worker's cottages and a goods yard. The station was closed to both passengers and goods traffic on 21 September 1953. The single platform remains along with the worker cottages but a closed toilet block now occupies what was the goods yard.

Preceding station	Disused railways	Following station
Ebchester; Line and station closed	North Eastern Railway; Derwent Valley Railway	Blackhill; Line and station closed
