= Newlands, Northumberland =

Hamlet in Northumberland, England

Coordinates: 54.894°N 1.859°W

Newlands
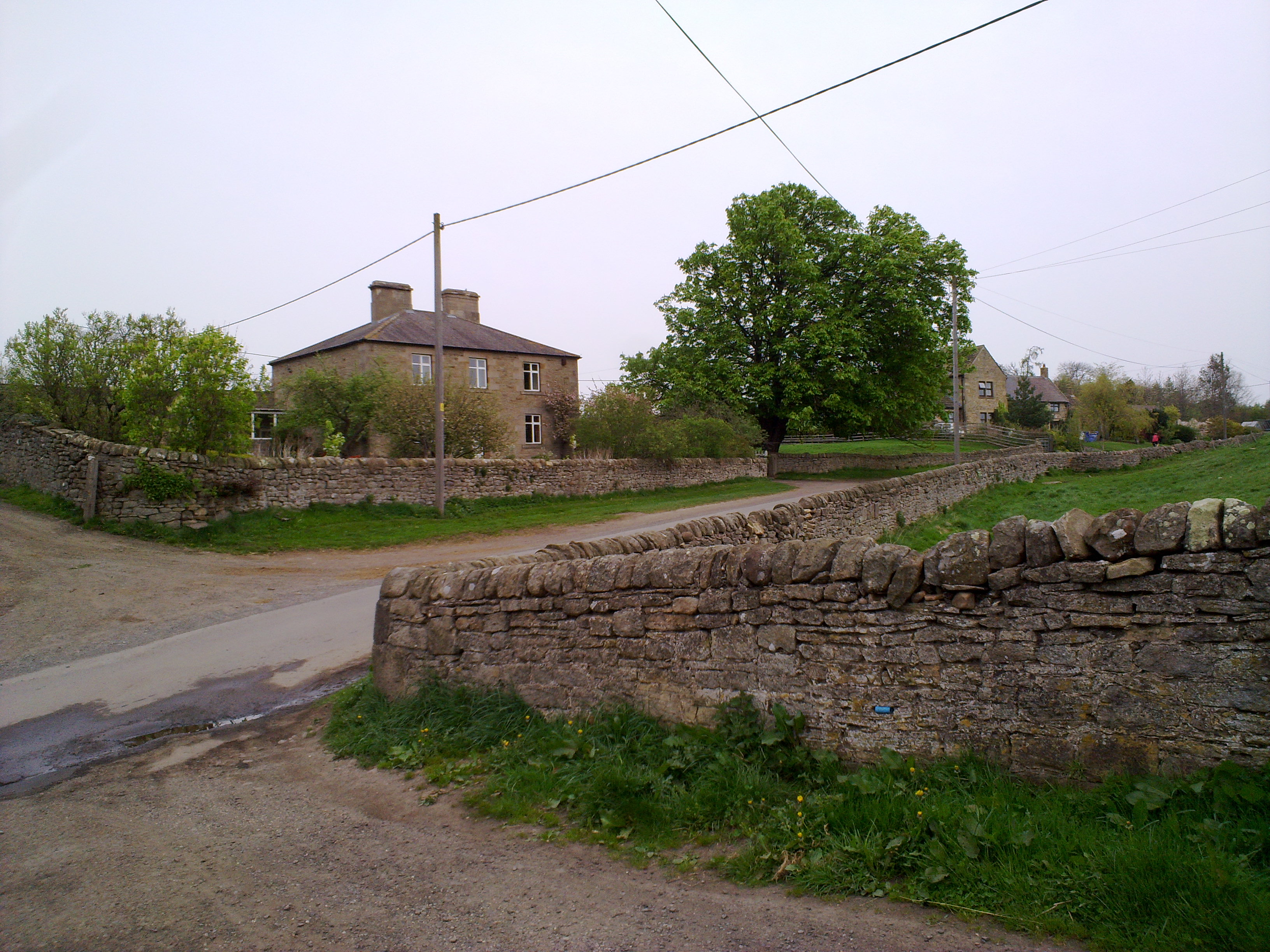

- Location within Northumberland
- Civil parish: Shotley Low Quarter
- Unitary authority: Northumberland
- Shire county: Northumberland
- Region: North East
- Country: England
- Sovereign state: United Kingdom
- Post town: CONSETT
- Postcode district: DH8
- Police: Northumbria
- Fire: Northumberland
- Ambulance: North East

Newlands is a hamlet and former civil parish, now in the parish of Shotley Low Quarter, in the county of Northumberland, England. It is north of Ebchester and south of Whittonstall on the B6309, which follows the route of the ancient Roman road of Watling Street. It is situated north of the River Derwent (forming a border between County Durham and Northumberland). The nearest large settlement is Consett to the south west. In 1951 the parish had a population of 71.

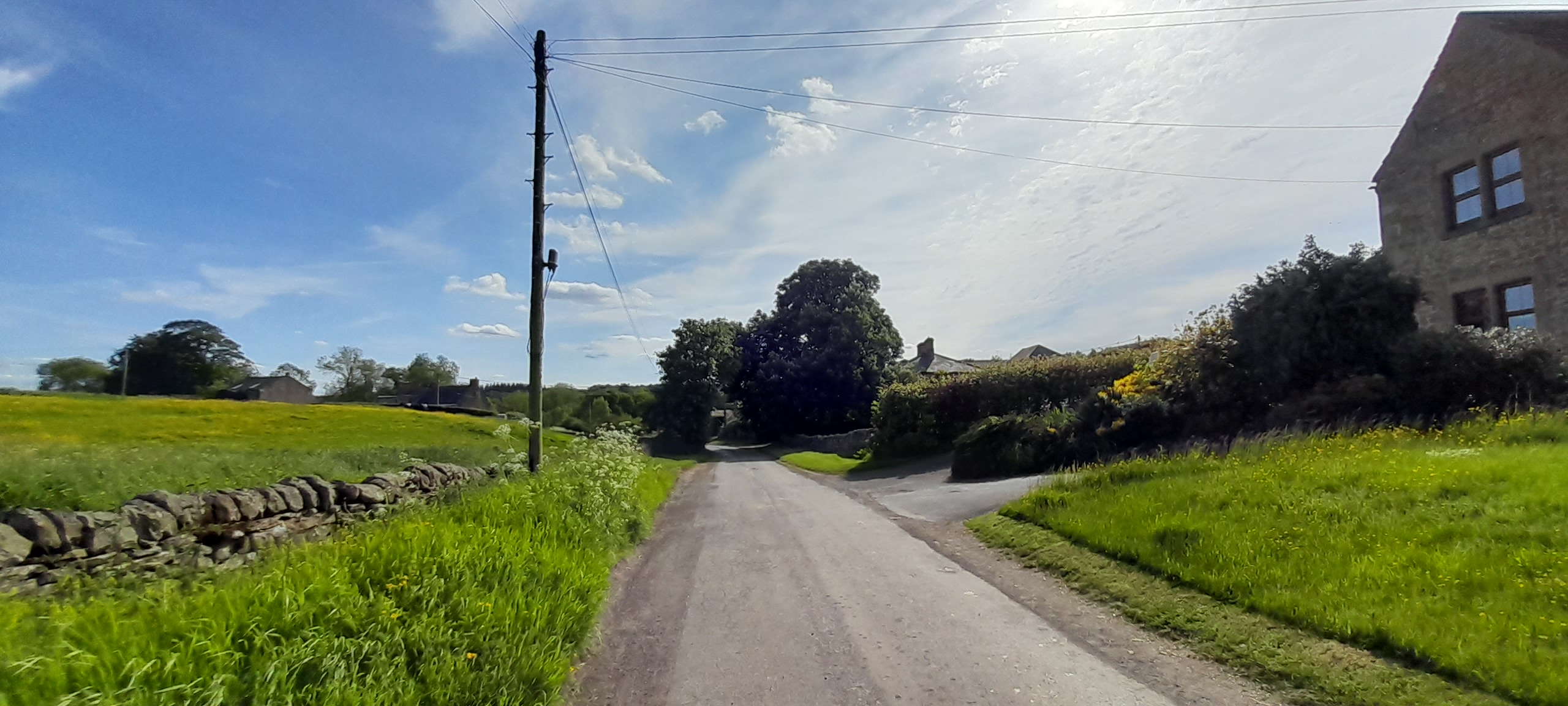
Newlands, a hamlet in Northumberland near the County Durham village of Ebchester.

The hamlet consists mainly of a group of closely located farmhouses on a road called Fine Lane, west of and coming off the B6309. The derelict Marley Tiles factory sits on the B6309 itself, currently subject to a planning application for 109 homes.

A second batch of houses and rental chalets known as Newlands Lodges sit at the point where the B6309 crosses the River Derwent and climbs Chare Bank into Ebchester where it meets and crosses the A694.

The only public transport is the twice daily 689 bus service (three times Saturday) between Consett and Hexham via Slaley. However, bus links to Newcastle and Consett (X45 and 47) are available from nearby Ebchester.

== Attractions ==
Veering south west off Fine Lane and past Sisterson Farm, is a footpath running parallel to then crossing a stream known as Small Burn. Two waterfalls can be found on this stream, collectively referred to on Google Maps as Small Burn Falls (nicknamed Sisterson Falls by some, after the nearby farm. Not owned by Farm.). The first is hidden in the trees at the top of a gorge on the edge of Newlands (note this can be dangerous to access when the stream is in flood). The second can be found a further 150 m further on where the footpath crosses Small Burn over a stone bridge.

The path crosses a further stream called Mere Burn with another small waterfall, Mere Burn Waterfall, before turning south then running south west adjacent to the River Derwent towards Shotley Bridge. For this reason, the path is nicknamed locally as Waterfall Way. Both streams join the River Derwent.

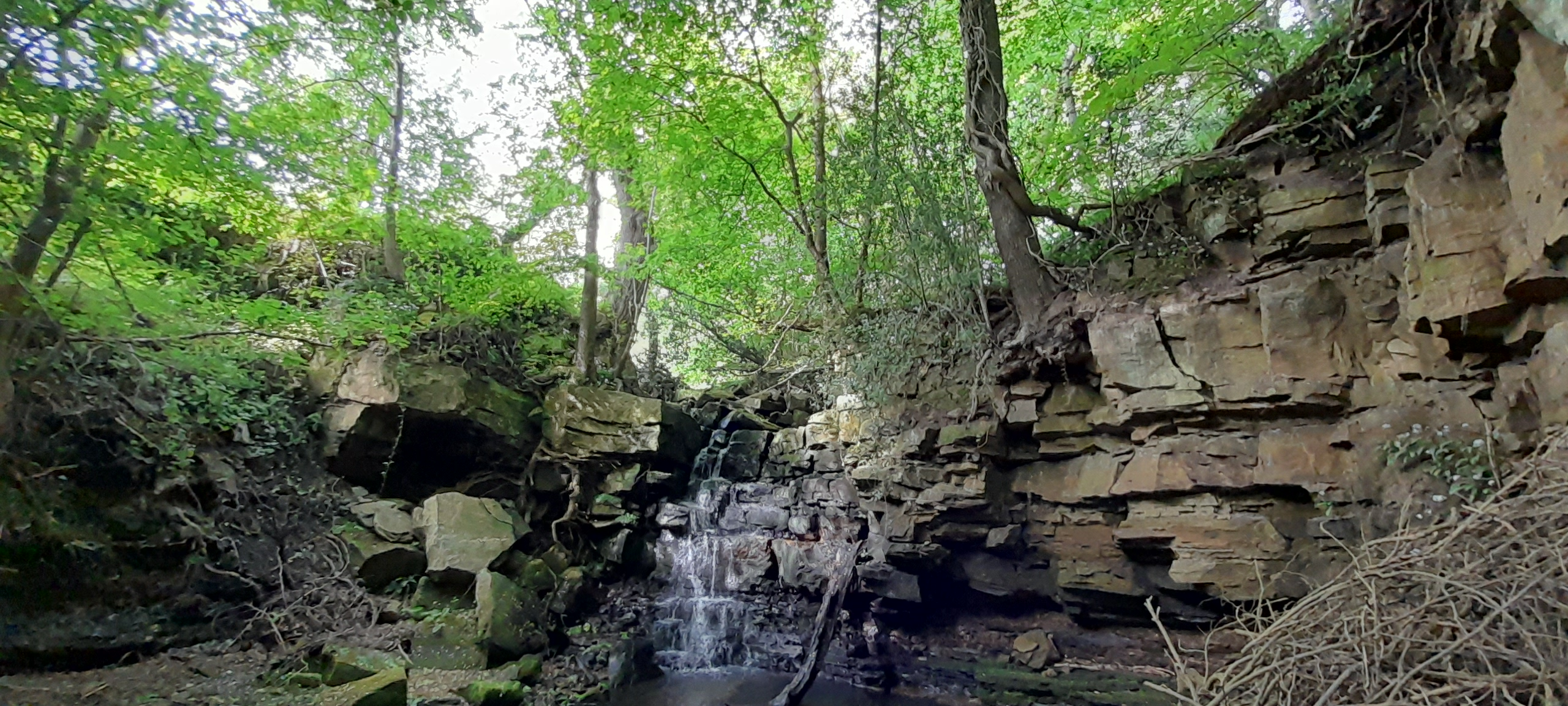
The first of the two Small Burn waterfalls, referred to on Google Maps as Sisterson Falls, Newlands, as it’s near to Sisterson farm. The first is the nearest one to the hamlet, hidden in a gorge.

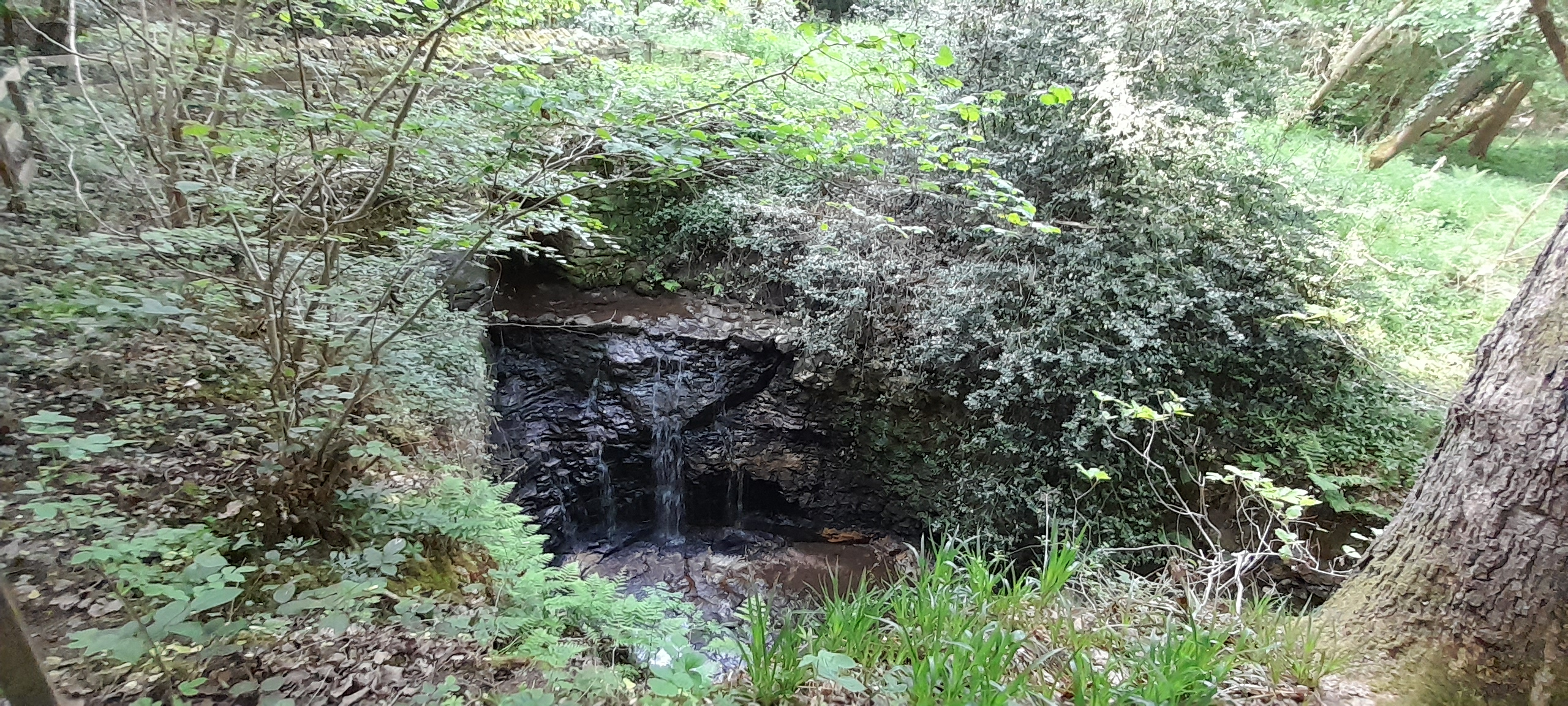
The second of the two Small Burn waterfalls, Newlands. This waterfall is further away from Newlands, again on the stream known as Small Burn.

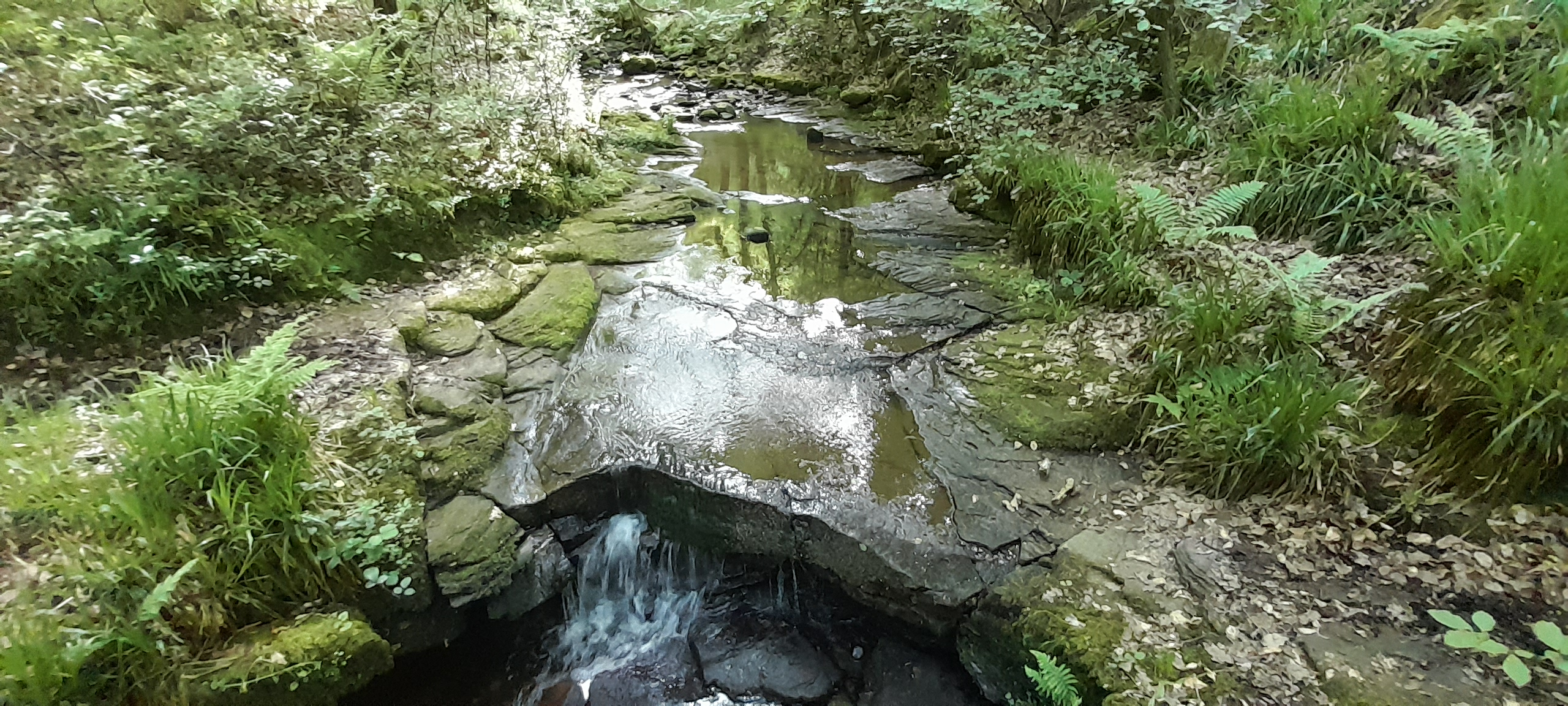
Mere Burn Waterfall outside Newlands. This small waterfall exists as shown where the footpath crosses Mere Burn further away from Newlands on the way to Shotley Bridge.

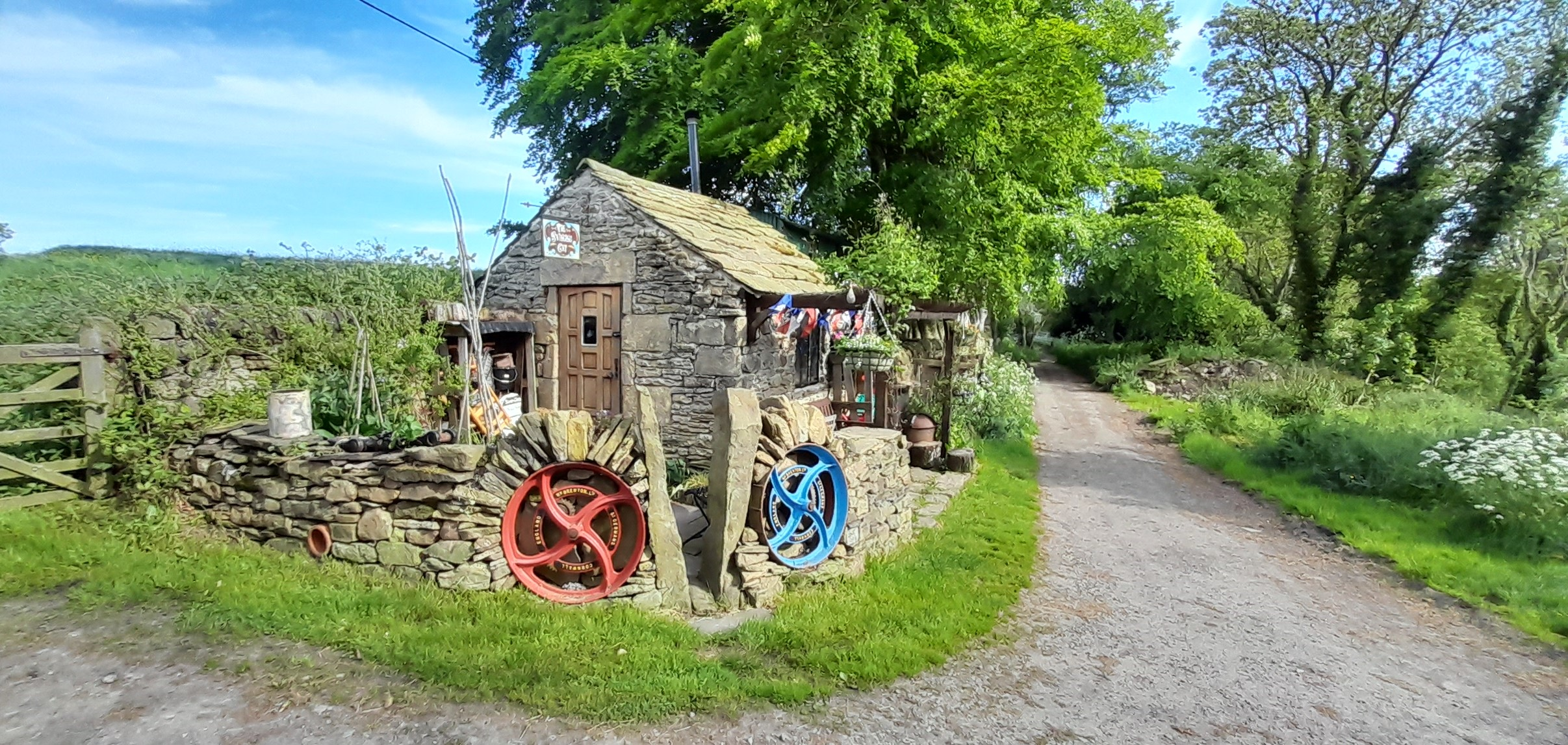
The Swinging Cat, Newlands, Northumberland.

== History ==
The name "Newlands" means 'New land'.

The origins of the hamlet possibly date back to the granting of 314 acres of land in 1200 by Hugh de Baliol in about 1200 "to be assarted (cleared of trees), cultivated, built upon and enclosed" on the Ebchester road. Another 200 acres were added later

Newlands was formerly a township in the parish of Bywell St. Peter, from 1866 Newlands was a civil parish in its own right, on 1 April 1955 the parish was abolished and merged with Shotley Low Quarter.
