= High Westwood =

English village in County Durham

Coordinates: 54°53′48″N 1°49′17″W

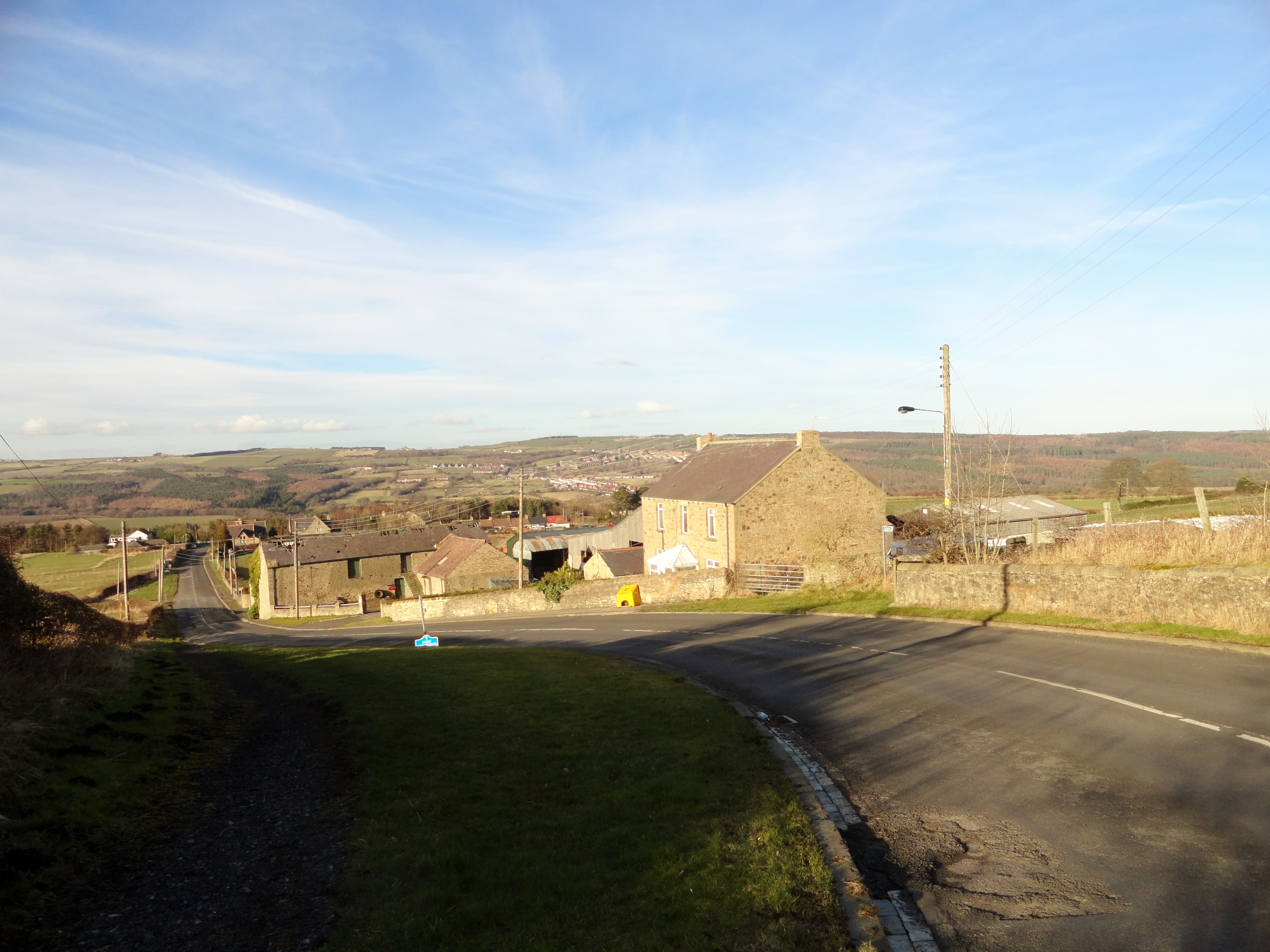
Looking north from Allendale Farm

High Westwood is an English village in County Durham, a few miles to the north of Consett, near Ebchester and Hamsterley. It once had a colliery and coke works.

Westwood colliery began operation in the 1870s and was owned by Consett Iron Company. It ceased operations in 1964.

With the closure of the colliery in 1964 the miners' houses at High Westwood were demolished when they became vacant. Those houses at Allendale Cottages were to be used by the council for housing but they too were to be demolished. By 1972 demolition of the houses was practically complete.

== Past and present ==
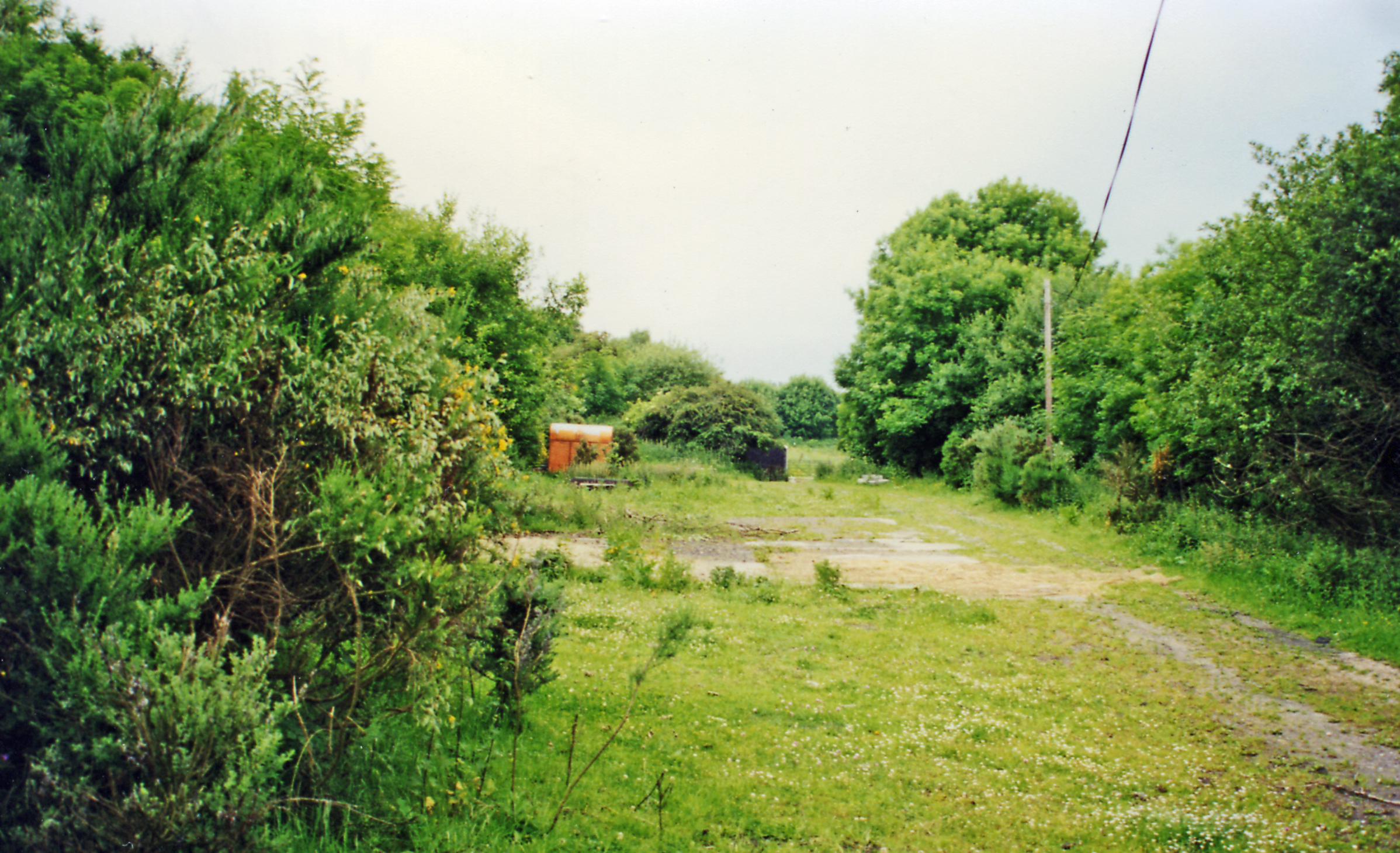
Site of High Westwood Station

Once a thriving industrial village, High Westwood is now much reduced in size and amenities. There was a railway station on the Derwent Valley line from 1904 to 1942.

The village is now surrounded by countryside and the old railway line part of a country walkway. Nearby oak woodland still has deer and glades of bluebells, but the red squirrels vanished in the 2000s. Barn owls and tawny owls are common, along with a wide range of smaller birds.

The site of the former Westwood County Junior Mixed and Infant School is now a housing complex, where the houses are named after one of the rows of colliery houses demolished in the early 1970s. There is also a row of six surviving bungalows. The school was built in 1879 and there was a centenary celebration held in 1979, but it was closed in about 2003 with too few pupils.

The village still has a cricket pitch that is used regularly, but the football pitch and the other sports and leisure amenities are overgrown.

On the 5 July 2016, planning permission was passed for a substantial commercial livery stable to be built in front of the village houses (ref Durham County Council planning portal) despite strong objections from the village and the risk posed by increased traffic on single track roads with no passing places and blind corners. The objectors' hopes then rested a Coal Authority subsidence report on the stability of the land. It was alleged that no member of the planning committee had ever been to High Westwood.Eight years later it is still unfinished!
