= Whittonstall =

Village in Northumberland, England

Coordinates: 54.909°N 1.890°W

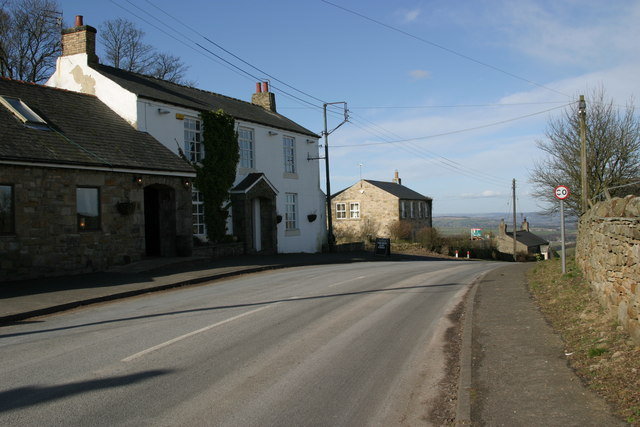

- Location within Northumberland
- Civil parish: Shotley Low Quarter
- Unitary authority: Northumberland
- Ceremonial county: Northumberland
- Region: North East
- Country: England
- Sovereign state: United Kingdom
- Post town: STOCKSFIELD
- Postcode district: NE43
- Dialling code: 01661
- Police: Northumbria
- Fire: Northumberland
- Ambulance: North East
- UK Parliament: Hexham

Whittonstall is a hilltop village (altitude 252 metres or 826 feet above sea level) in the civil parish of Shotley Low Quarter, in Northumberland, England.

== Description ==
It is situated between Hexham and Consett, to the south of the River Tyne and north of the River Derwent. Newlands, Northumberland is one and a half miles to the south. Broomley is a mile to the north. A minor road turns west at the north end of the village, crossing the A68 after two miles and eventually reaching the village of Slaley near Hexham.

Whittonstall was formerly a chapelry and chapelry in the parish of Bywell-St. Peter, in 1866 Whittonstall became a separate civil parish, on 1 April 1955 the parish was abolished and merged with Shotley Low Quarter. In 1951 the parish had a population of 127.

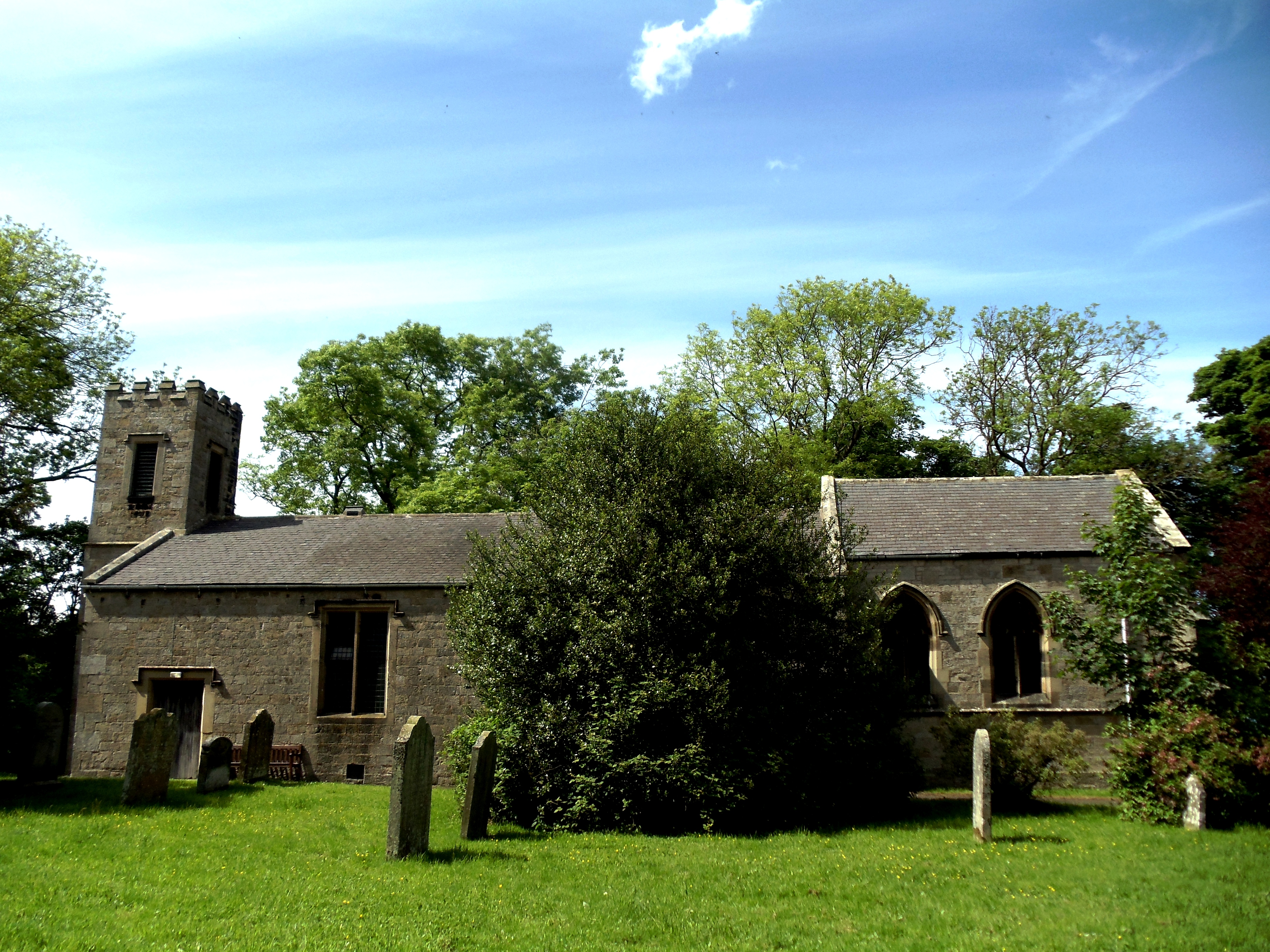
St. Philip and St. James Church, Whittonstall

The most notable local landmarks are The Anchor Inn, a public house (pictured in the information box) and the chapel of St. Philip and St. James set back off the B6309 road (following the route of the Dere Street Roman road) passing through the village. This starts at Leadgate (roundabout junction with the A691 and A692), heading north and crossing the A694 and River Derwent at Ebchester, passing through Newlands and after Whittonstall, continuing to Broomley after which it joins the A68.

Whittonstall First School is situated across the road from the Anchor Inn.

The only public transport is the twice daily 689 bus service (three times Saturday) between Consett and Hexham via Slaley.
