= Swalwell railway station =

Disused railway station in Swalwell, Tyne and Wear

Swalwell
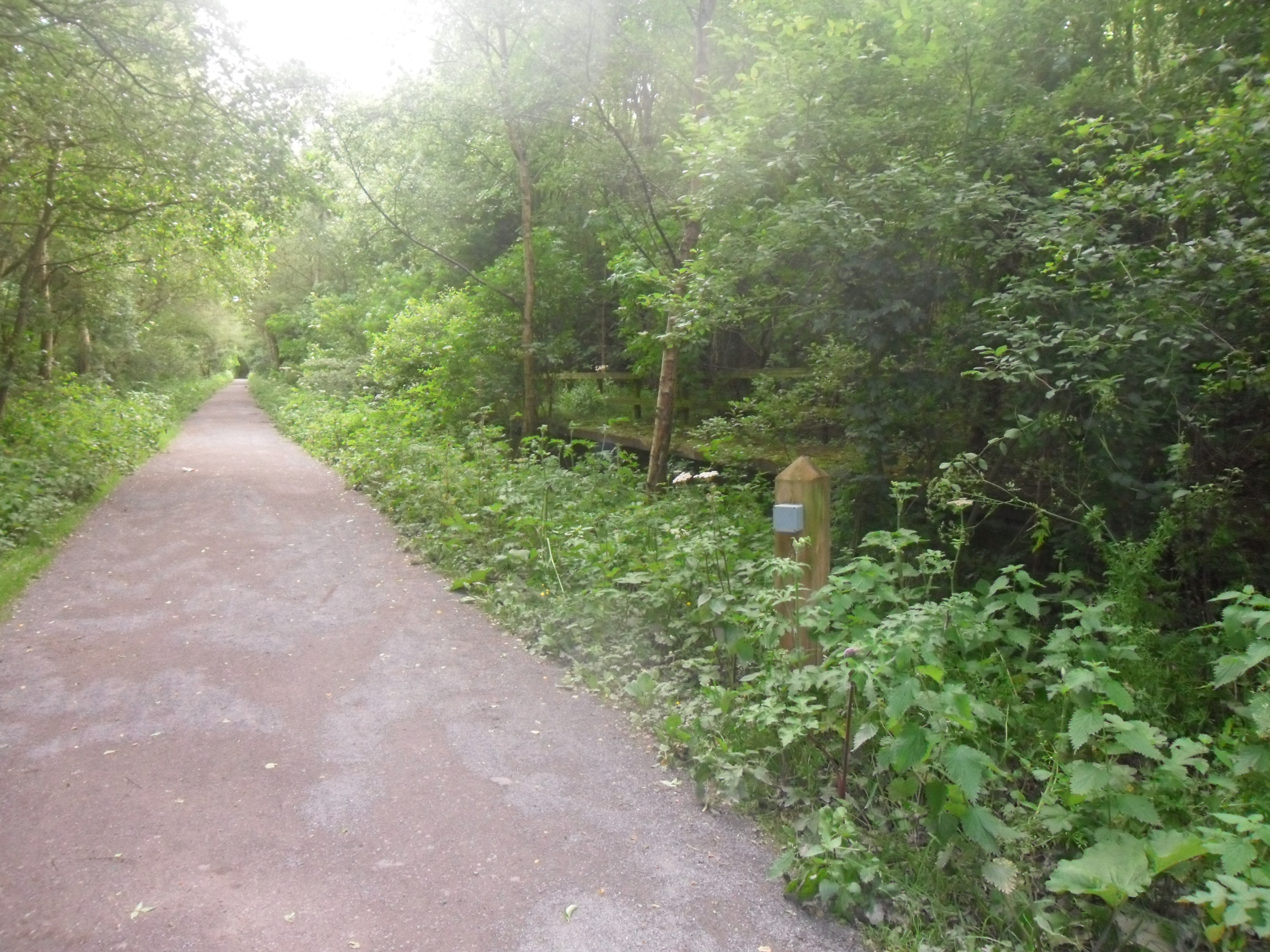
- The site of the station in 2012

General information
- Location: Swalwell, Tyne and Wear; England
- Coordinates: 54.9527°N 1.6895°W
- Grid reference: NZ199620
- Platforms: 2

Other information
- Status: Disused

History
- Original company: North Eastern Railway
- Post-grouping: LNER; British Railways (North Eastern)

Key dates
- April 1868: Opened
- 2 November 1953: Closed to passengers
- 7 March 1960: Closed completely
Location

Swalwell railway station served the village of Swalwell, Tyne and Wear, England from 1868 to 1960 on the Derwent Valley Railway.

== History ==
The station opened in April 1868 by the North Eastern Railway. The station was situated on the south side of Hexham Road on the B6317. Freight traffic served collieries, coke-ovens, brickworks, paper mills, dairy farms and the livestock market at Blackhill. This declined during the Second World War. After the war, the station failed to recover its passenger numbers, so it inevitably closed on 2 November 1953. As the road traffic became more efficient, freight traffic declined until it ceased on 7 March 1960. An excursion train later ran to Whitley Bay on 16 June 1962.

Preceding station	Disused railways	Following station
Scotswood; Line and station closed	North Eastern Railway; Derwent Valley Railway	Rowlands Gill; Line and station closed
