= Lintz Green railway station =

Former railway station in England

Lintz Green
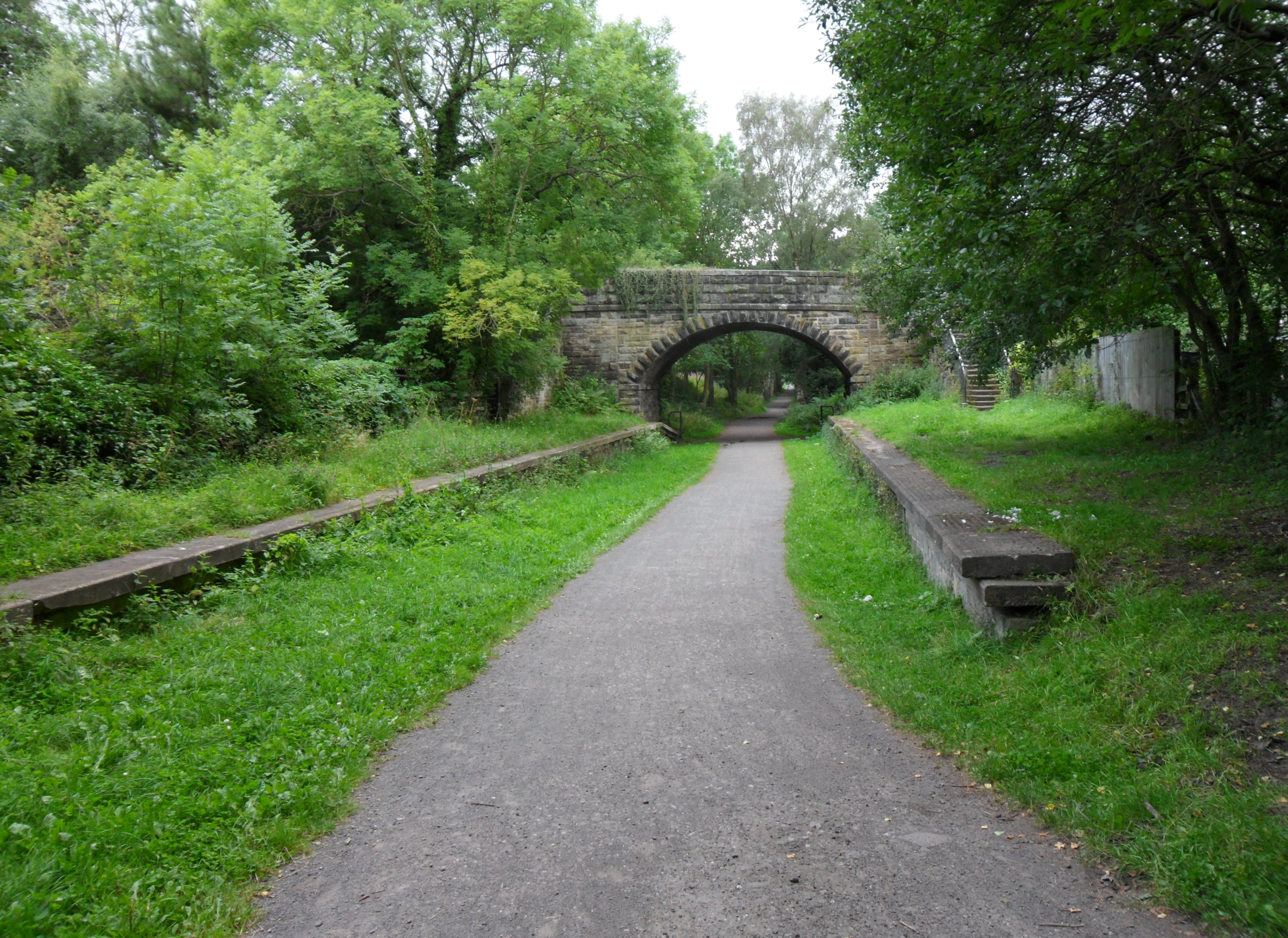
- Remains of the station in 2011

General information
- Location: County Durham; England
- Coordinates: 54.905°N 1.766°W
- Platforms: 2

Other information
- Status: Disused

History
- Original company: North Eastern Railway
- Pre-grouping: North Eastern Railway
- Post-grouping: London and North Eastern Railway

Key dates
- 2 December 1867: Station opens
- 2 November 1953: Station closes
Location

Lintz Green Railway Station was on the Derwent Valley Railway Branch of the North Eastern Railway near Consett, County Durham, England. The railway station opened with the rest of the line on 2 December 1867 and closed to passengers on the 2 November 1953. The line closed completely in 1963 and was dismantled with the station site becoming part of the Derwent Walk Country Park.

The hamlet of Lintz Green is roughly half a mile south of the station site, and the small village of Lintzford is by the River Derwent about a half-mile to the north.

The station was infamous at the time for the unsolved 1911 murder of its stationmaster.

== Unsolved murder ==
On the night of Saturday 7 October 1911 the sixty-year-old stationmaster, George Wilson, was shot when returning home after closing his office at the station. Although he did not die instantly, when questioned, Wilson was unable to say who had shot him.

The motive for the killing was probably robbery as Wilson was in the habit of carrying the day's takings from the booking office to his house, a trip of 50 yards, when he left for the night. On the day in question, however, he had transported the money earlier in the day. Although the murder hunt, still one of the largest in the northeast, involved two hundred officers, no one was convicted of the crime.

The prime suspect was the relief porter Samuel Atkinson who was arraigned at the local magistrates' court for the murder and sent for trial at the assize court in Durham. At the opening of the trial, the local chief constable, William E. Morant, appeared and offered no evidence against Atkinson, who was released.

== See also ==
- List of unsolved murders in the United Kingdom

| Preceding station | Disused railways | Following station |
|---|---|---|
| Rowlands Gill; Line and station closed | North Eastern Railway; Derwent Valley Railway | High Westwood; Line and station closed |
