= East Law =

Village in County Durham, England

Coordinates: 54.885°N 1.848°W

- Location within County Durham
- OS grid reference: NZ099545
- Unitary authority: County Durham
- Ceremonial county: County Durham
- Region: North East
- Country: England
- Sovereign state: United Kingdom
- Post town: DURHAM
- Postcode district: DH8
- Police: Durham
- Fire: County Durham and Darlington
- Ambulance: North East

East Law is a small village in County Durham, England. It is situated on the A694 to the north of Consett and north east of Shotley Bridge. It is located south west of Ebchester, of which it can be (probably mistakenly) considered an outlying part.

Derwent Hill, a Georgian mansion built in 1820, was the residence of the Quaker and engineer Edwin Octavius Tregelles. He moved there after his marriage to Elizabeth Richardson in 1850 and left in 1877. Elizabeth was the sister of Jonathan Richardson, of Shotley Park, founder of the Derwent Iron Company (later the Consett Iron Company).

The farm buildings at West Law (to the south of East Law) built in the late 17th century are listed buildings.

The River Derwent flows south west to north east in the valley to the village's south west, forming a border with neighbouring Northumberland.
