= Hamsterley, Consett =

Village in County Durham, England

Coordinates: 54°54′11″N 1°48′54″W

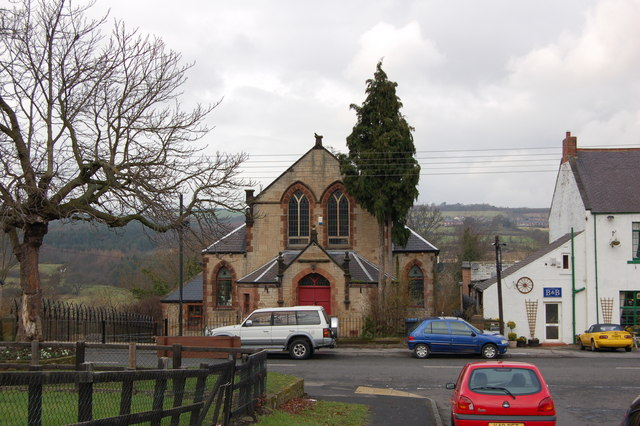
Converted chapel in Hamsterley

Hamsterley is a village in County Durham, England. It is situated to the north of Consett and borders the hamlet of Low Westwood.

The name Hamsterley possibly derives from the Old English ‘hamstra’, meaning a corn weevil and ‘ley’ meaning clearing, hence a clearing frequented by corn weevils, perhaps indicating the poor quality of farming in the area.

Hamsterley is mentioned in Bishop Hatfield’s survey of 1382, the land being held by John de Felton and the heirs of Hugh del Redhugh. By 1500 the lands were held by the Swinburne family whose descendants continued to hold the land until the early century 19th century. Hamsterley Hall was built by the Swinburnes in the early 17th century and later enlarged in the following centuries. The Surtees family took over the estate and hall in 1806, passing to the Viscounts Gort in 1885. Hamsterley Hall was the birthplace of the hunting novelist Robert Smith Surtees, author of Jorrocks' Jaunts and Jollities.

== Colliery ==
It was known until recently as Hamsterley Colliery, after the large mining colliery situated to the south of the village by the south banks of the River Derwent. The colliery, halfway between Hamsterley and High Westwood, had opened in 1864 and closed on 2 February 1968. The colliery was operated by Hamsterley Colliery Ltd, one of the directors being Sir Cecil Harcourt-Smith. He had married Alice Edith Watson, daughter of W. H. Watson owner of the mine in the 1860s.

== Homonymous ==
One of two villages of this name in County Durham, Hamsterley should not be confused with the larger village of Hamsterley, near Bishop Auckland, 20 miles to the south.
