= Shotley Bridge =

Village in England

Coordinates: 54.87°N 1.86°W

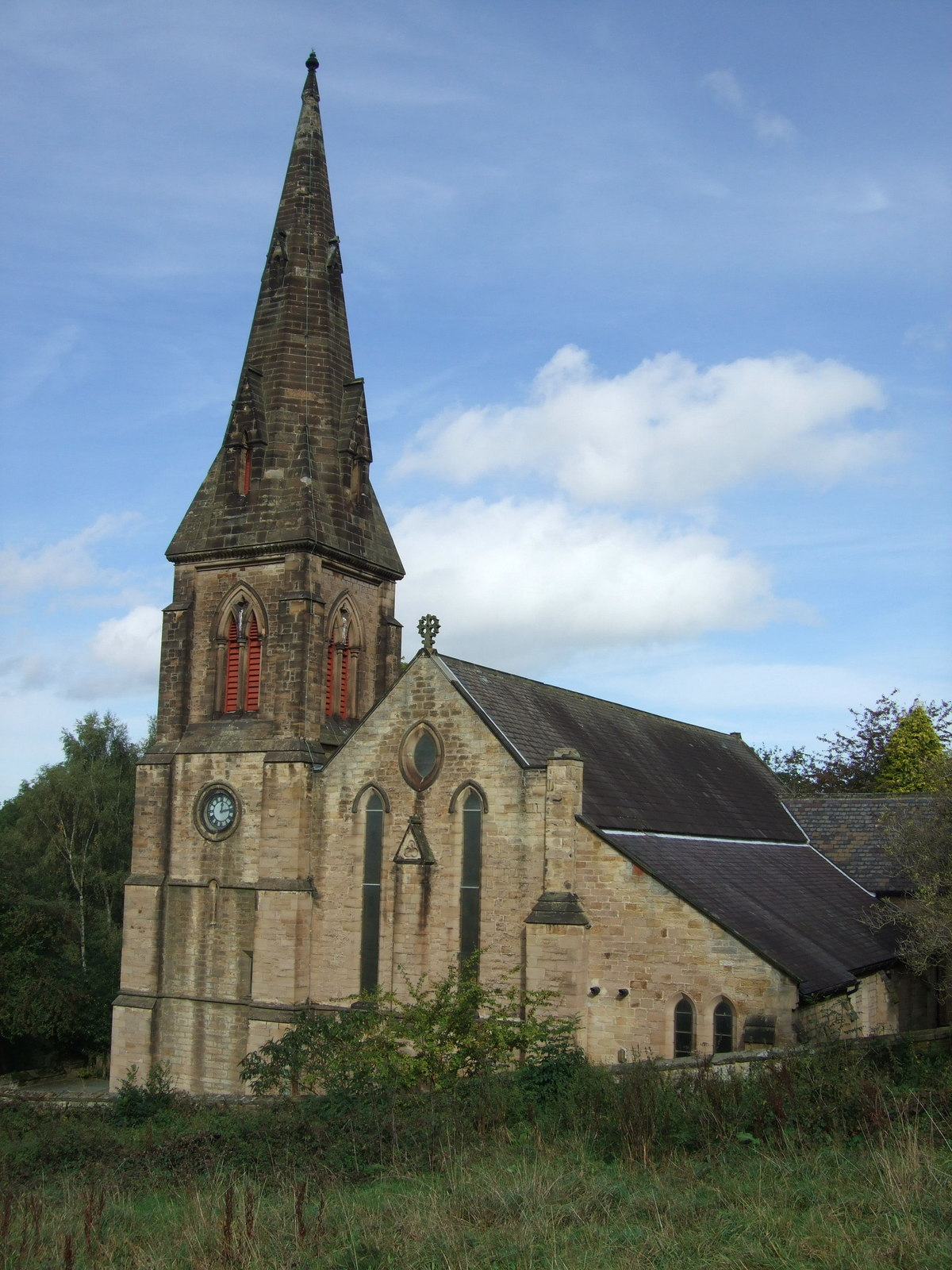
- St Cuthbert's Church

- Location within County Durham
- Population: 27,394
- OS grid reference: NZ108511
- Unitary authority: County Durham
- Ceremonial county: Durham
- Region: North East
- Country: England
- Sovereign state: United Kingdom
- Post town: CONSETT
- Postcode district: DH8
- Dialling code: 01207
- Police: Durham
- Fire: County Durham and Darlington
- Ambulance: North East
- UK Parliament: North West Durham

Shotley Bridge is a village, adjoining the town of Consett to the south in County Durham, England, 15 miles northwest of Durham.

It is located on the A694 road starting from Consett and Blackhill to the south, then continuing north east to East Law, Ebchester and onward to Swalwell within the borough of Gateshead. Shotley Bridge sits beside the River Derwent which is crossed by the bridge giving the name. A small portion sits on the far bank of the River Derwent to the north west within the county of Northumberland. and along a side road to the west of the Kings Head Social Club and right off the A694 sits the hamlet of Shotley Grove.

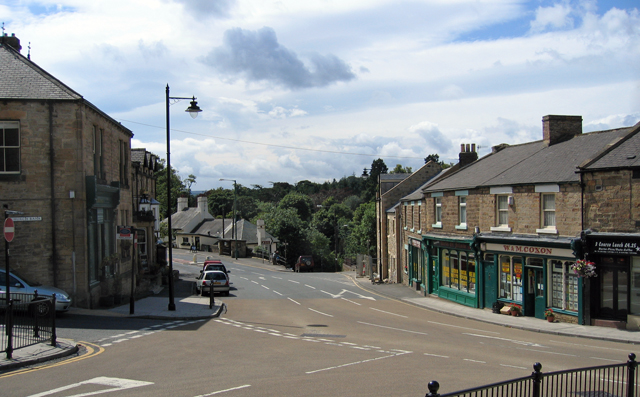
Shotley Bridge - centre of village with Crown and Crossed Swords public house on the left and road leading to the bridge of Shotley Bridge on the right.

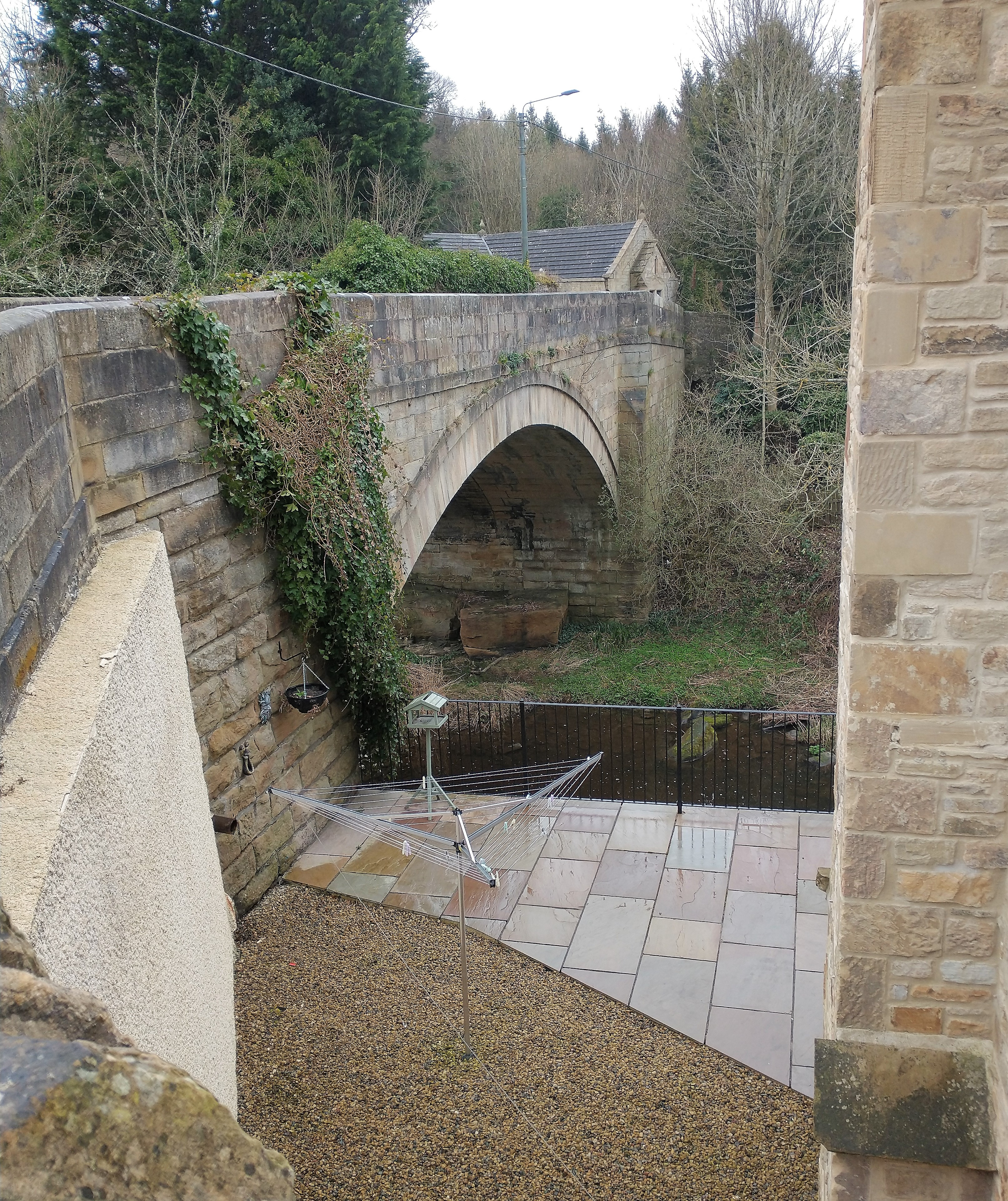
The bridge at Shotley Bridge, from where the village gets its name.

Shotley Bridge was once the heart of Britain's swordmaking industry.

== History ==
There were formerly several fords over the River Derwent near this place and in medieval times a wooden bridge. The present stone bridge was widened in 1820, but its original date is not known. The bed of the river itself was the source of stone for millstones, and licences for this are recorded at "Shotley Brig" in 1356.

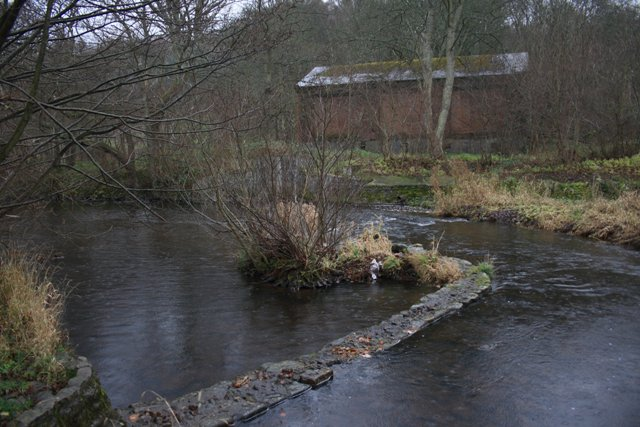
Disused Weir, River Derwent, Shotley Grove, just south west of Shotley Bridge. The building behind is an old pump house.

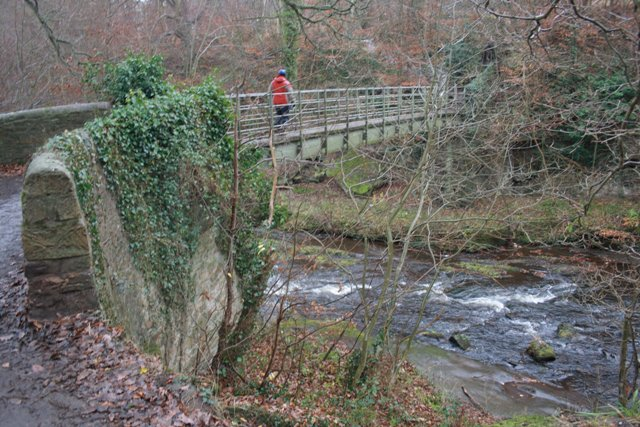
Shotley Grove Footbridge over the River Derwent just south west of Shotley Bridge

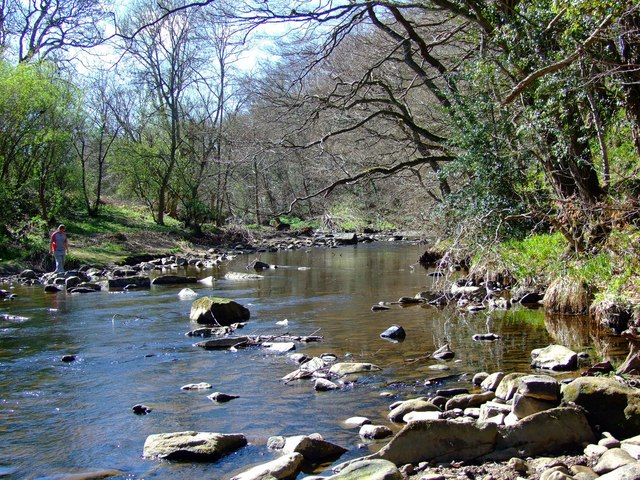
The River Derwent at Shotley Grove, near Shotley Bridge

A water-powered corn mill was established in the 14th century, later replaced by a steam-powered one which was sold to the Derwent Co-operative Flour Mill Society Ltd in 1872, and continued until its closure in 1920. A paper mill was established in 1788 (the first in the north of England) and greatly expanded with mechanization so that in 1894 it had 300 hands (half being girls) and was a major factor in the expansion of the village. However it closed in 1905.

A well near the village had unpleasant tasting water rumoured to be effective in curing disease and thus known as the "Hally Well" (hally = healthy, like hale). In 1828 a local entrepreneur John Richardson used this as the basis for a Spa which enjoyed considerable success with the well-to-do, becoming less fashionable as industry grew in nearby towns, but being remade as a playground for workers.

It was during the Victorian era that much of the town's architecture was constructed, including some grand residences and many listed buildings, so that by 1898 it had much of its present form. and a population of over 1000. This also saw the advent of Shotley Bridge railway station (closed 1952) and a gasworks which closed in the 1960s, electric lighting having replaced gas lamps from 1950. The closure of the steelworks at Consett in 1980 caused an economic decline, however since then the village has become more popular.

== Swordmaking ==
In the 17th century a group of swordmakers (Oley, Vooz, Molle and Bertram) from Solingen in Germany settled in Shotley Bridge, in order to escape religious persecution. Shotley Bridge was chosen because of the quality of the ironstone in the area and the softness and fast flow of the River Derwent.

The Oley family were makers of the highest quality swords, rivalling those of Toledo, by using Damascus steel, in great demand during the Napoleonic Wars. They became very wealthy. Their steel production facility was one of the earliest factories for manufacture of steel. The Oley family were involved in the formation of the Consett Iron Company. New weapons and industrialization reduced demand for swords so they diversified into other types of cutlery, but could not compete with Sheffield, and the sword works closed in 1840. Some moved to Birmingham and their business eventually became part of Wilkinson Sword.

Evidence of this industry includes grooves in the stones of the river, the fine house inscribed "Cutlers Hall, 1767, William Oley" and the name of the public house "The Crown and Crossed Swords". Before the last remaining cottages occupied by the swordmakers were demolished, there was an inscription over the door of the Oley house on Wood Street reading "Das Herren segen machet reich ohn alle Sorg wenn Du zugleich in deinem Stand treu und fleissig bist und tuest alle vas die befolen ist". This means "The blessing of the Lord makes rich without care, so long as you are industrious in your vocation and do what is ordered you".

== Places of Worship ==
The first mention of a chapel at Shotley is in 1165. This is the site of the (now disused) Anglican parish church, St Andrew's, Shotley, which is high on a hill above the town. It is an eighteenth-century Grade II listed building rebuilt in 1892 because of subsidence due to coal workings below. The current parish church is that of St John at Snod's Edge, also Grade II listed, dating from 1837 when it was founded as a chapel outpost of St Andrew's. There is a Roman Catholic Church, Our Lady of the Rosary (1952), and an Anglican Church, St Cuthbert's (1850), designed by John Dobson, in the Benfieldside area south-east of the main town. The Methodist Church was built in 1894, and closed in 2014.

== Shotley Bridge Hospital ==
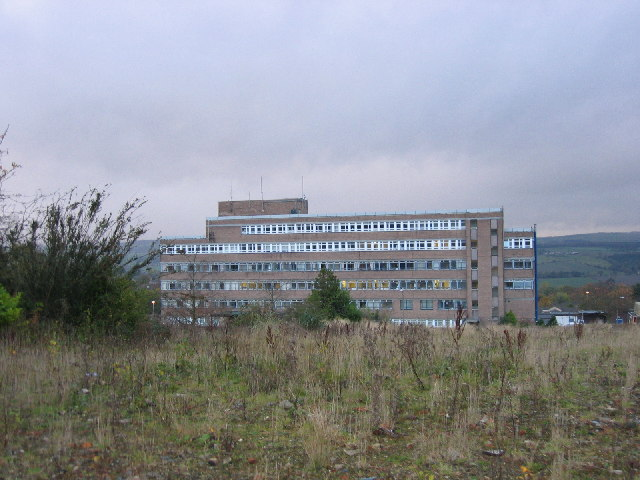
Shotley Bridge Hospital

Shotley Bridge Hospital originated with the acquisition of the Whinney House Estate in 1912. The site was initially used as a tuberculosis hospital but served as a facility for the care of people with mental problems being known as "Shotley Bridge Mental Defectives Colony" from 1927 to 1940, when it was converted to an Emergency Hospital to cope with the Second World War, particularly providing plastic surgery, becoming a general hospital in 1948. Although it was once one of the largest of the Northern Region services have been transferred elsewhere, most of the buildings demolished for housing and the current hospital is a much smaller group of modern buildings operating as a community hospital.

== Other buildings and public houses ==
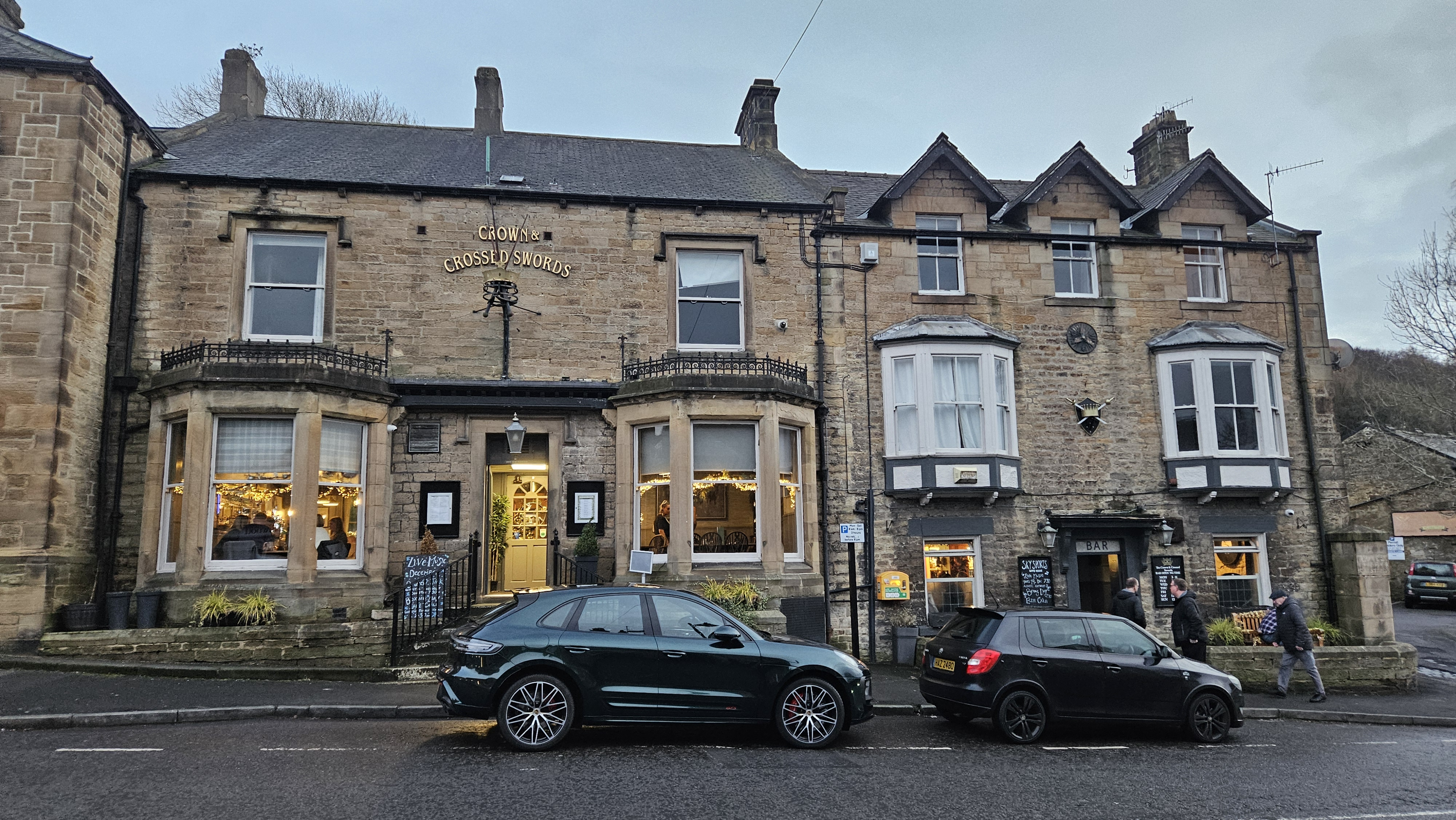
Crown and Crossed Swords public house in Shotley Bridge.

In the Victorian boom time, the village was often referred to as a town with such enthusiasm that a Town Hall was actually built in 1860. It is one of several buildings from this period in Neogothic style. Another is Shotley Hall by Edward Robson. There are other grand houses from this period which are some of the many listed buildings in the area. While the Wesleyan Chapel was demolished, its Sunday School remains and is now the Village Hall. The clergyman's house (vicarage) is now known as The Manse. The 1876 Temperance Hall is now the Assembly Rooms. The Crown and Crossed Swords hotel includes what was once a separate establishment, The Commercial.

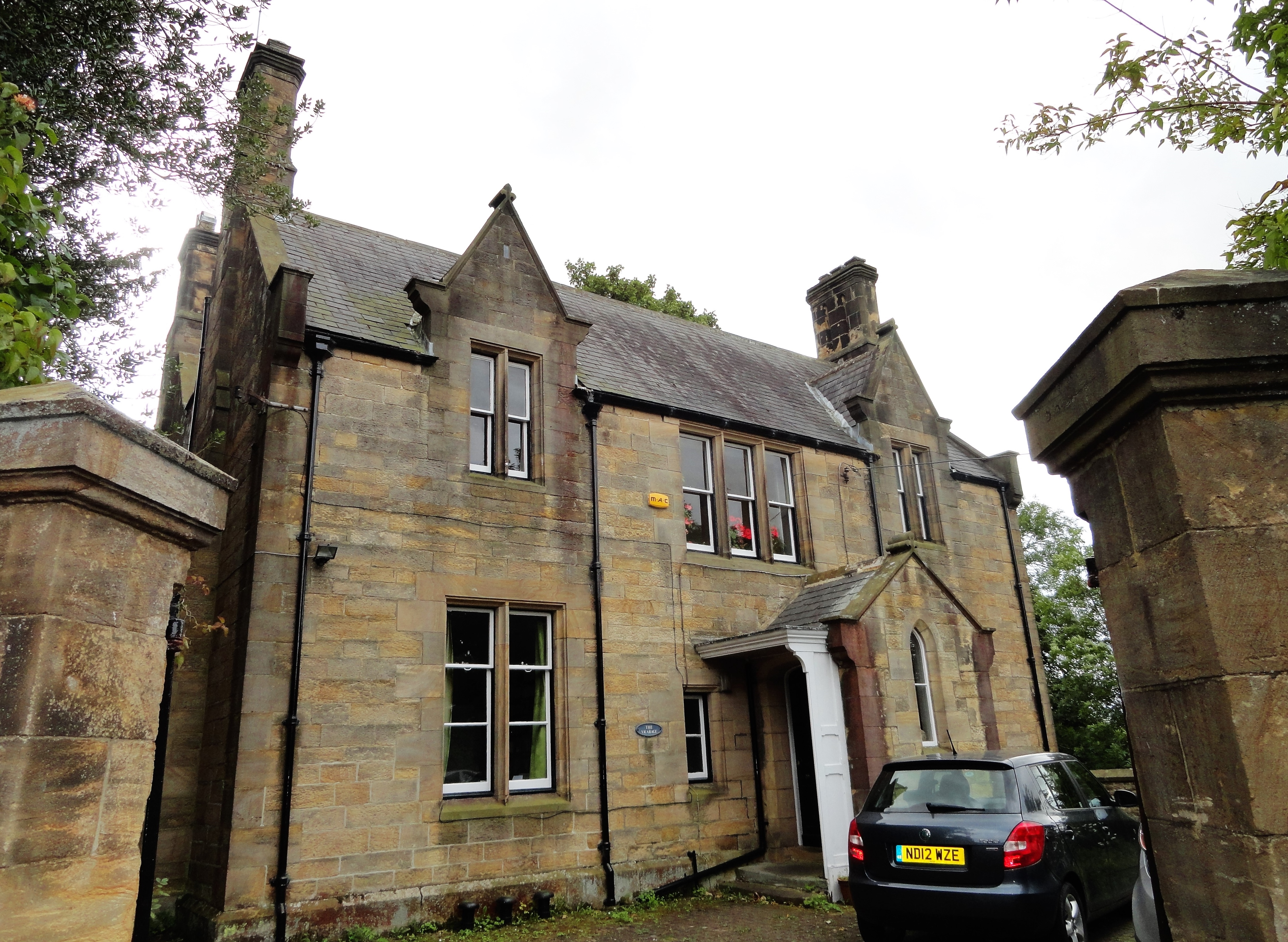
The Clergyman's House or Vicarage at Shotley Bridge

The King's Head, now a social club, sits opposite the Crown and Crossed Swords.

== Other attractions ==
There are a couple of footpaths of note.

One heads west and away from the A694 from close to the King's Head, crossing the River Derwent at Shotley Grove (there is a choice of two bridges 400 metres apart) then continuing along the north bank of the Derwent to Allensford and the A68. The path continues beyond this on the south side of the Derwent to Wharnley Burn Waterfall.

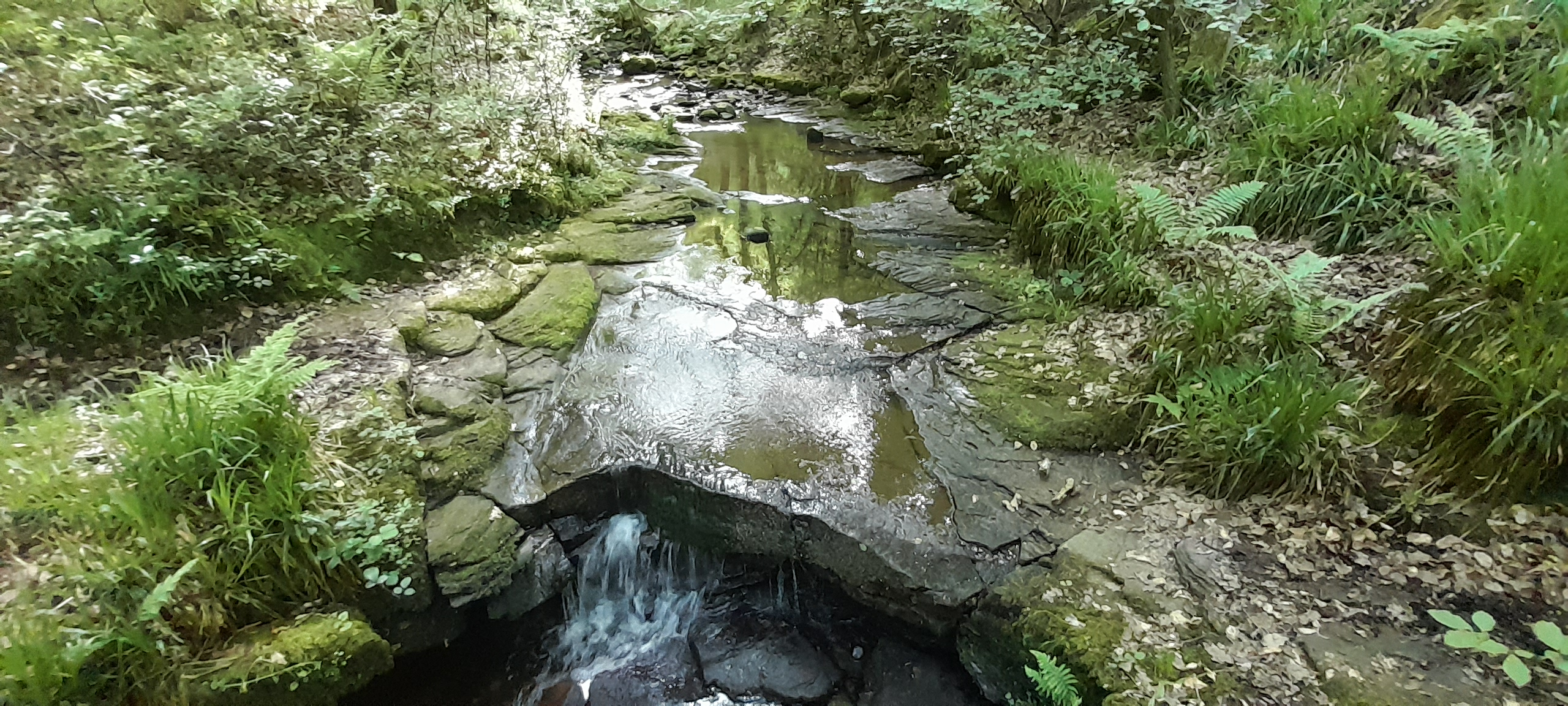
Mere Burn outside Newlands. A small waterfall exists as shown where the footpath crosses Mere Burn further away from Newlands on the way to Shotley Bridge.

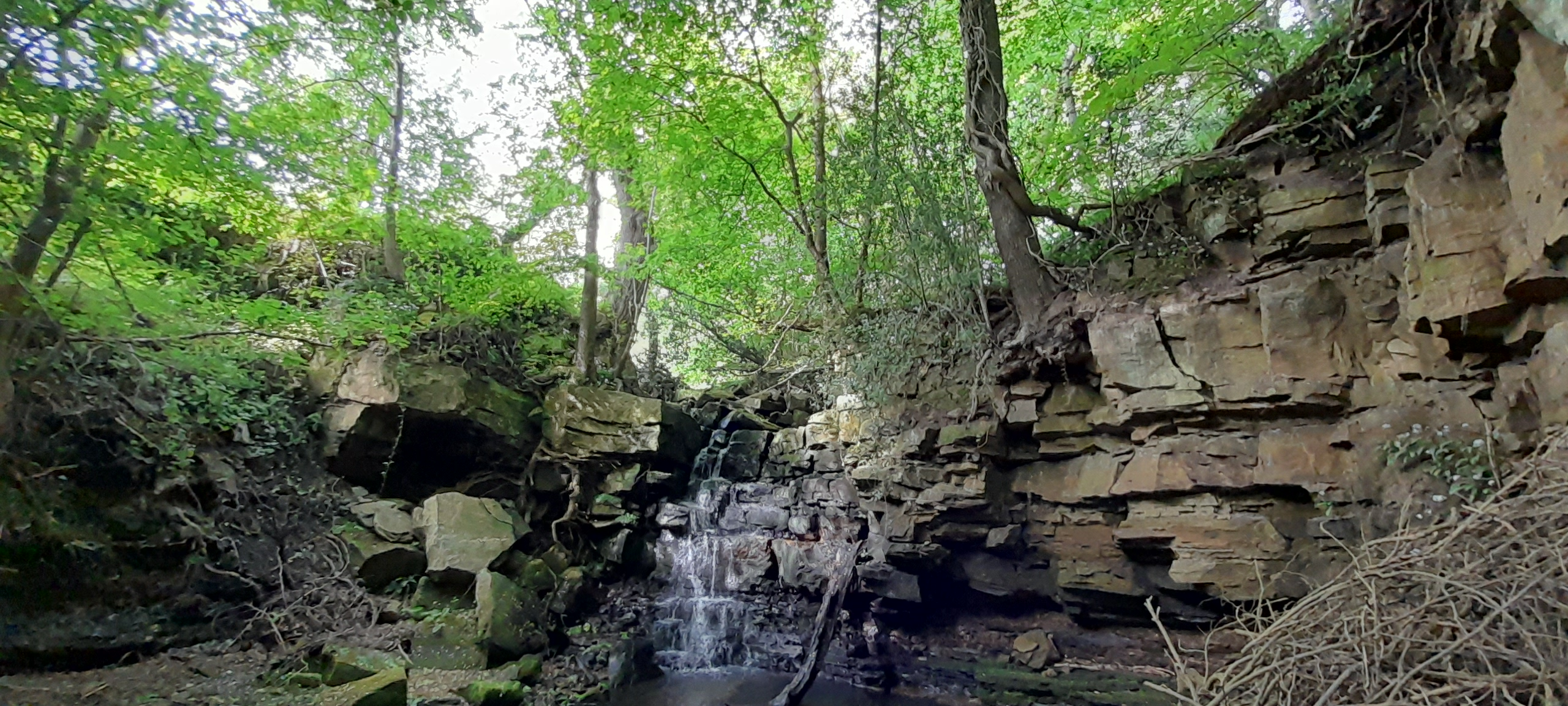
The first of the two Small Burn Falls waterfalls (also nicknamed Sisterson Falls after a nearby farm), Newlands. The first is the nearest one to the hamlet, hidden in a gorge.

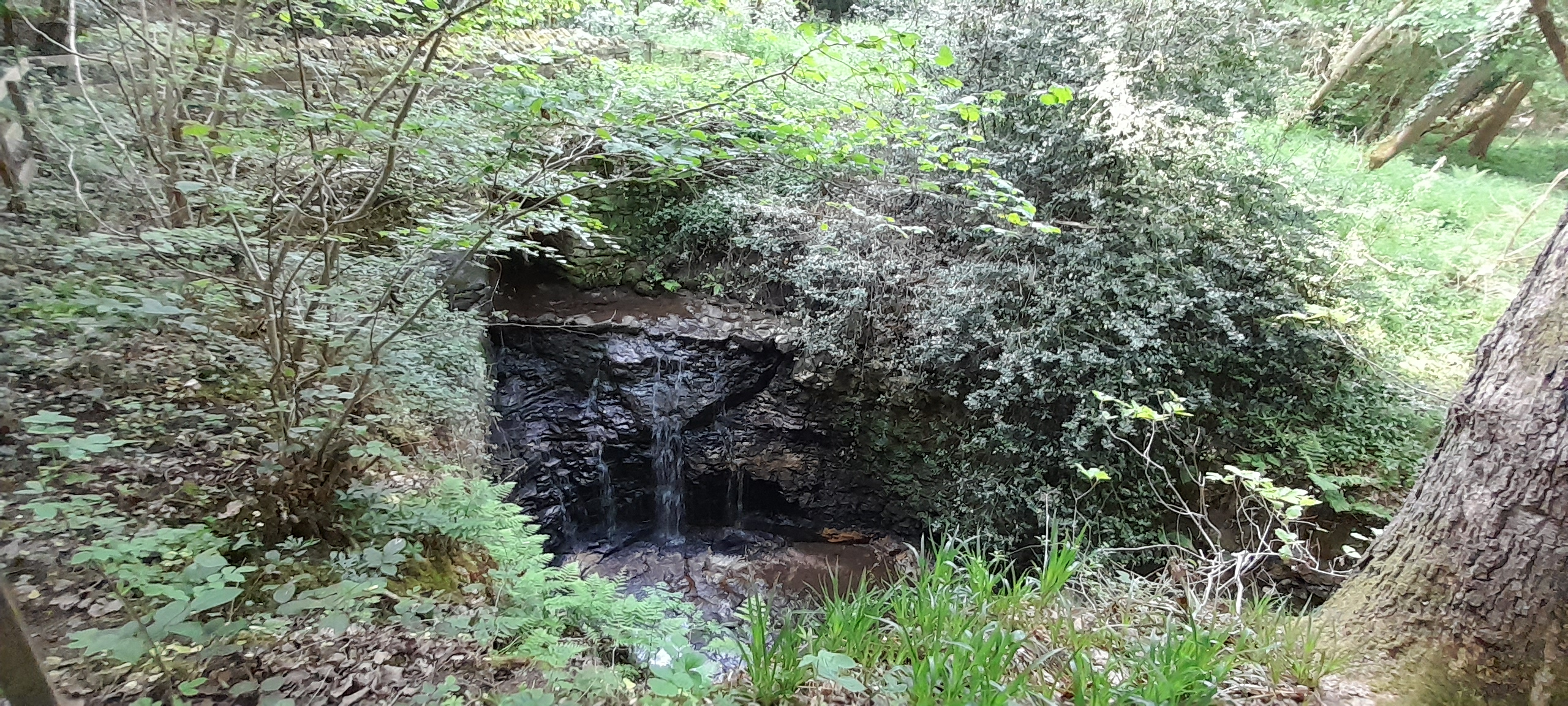
The second of the two Small Burn waterfalls, Newlands. This waterfall is further away from Newlands, again on the stream known as Small Burn.

The other can be accessed up a set of small stone stairs from the road on crossing the bridge across the Derwent to the right (east). This path leads along the north bank of the River Derwent, through first a large field on the opposite side of the river to the Shotley Bridge Cricket Club, then a small wooded nature reserve including the artificially created Price Pond (Google Maps) / wetland and stream, a farm at the top of the following hill, and eventually to the Northumberland hamlet of Newlands. This path has the nickname Waterfall Way due to there being one small waterfall on Mere Burn and two on Small Burn close to the Newlands end of the path. The two near Newlands are also referred to as Sisterson Falls with reference to a nearby farm.

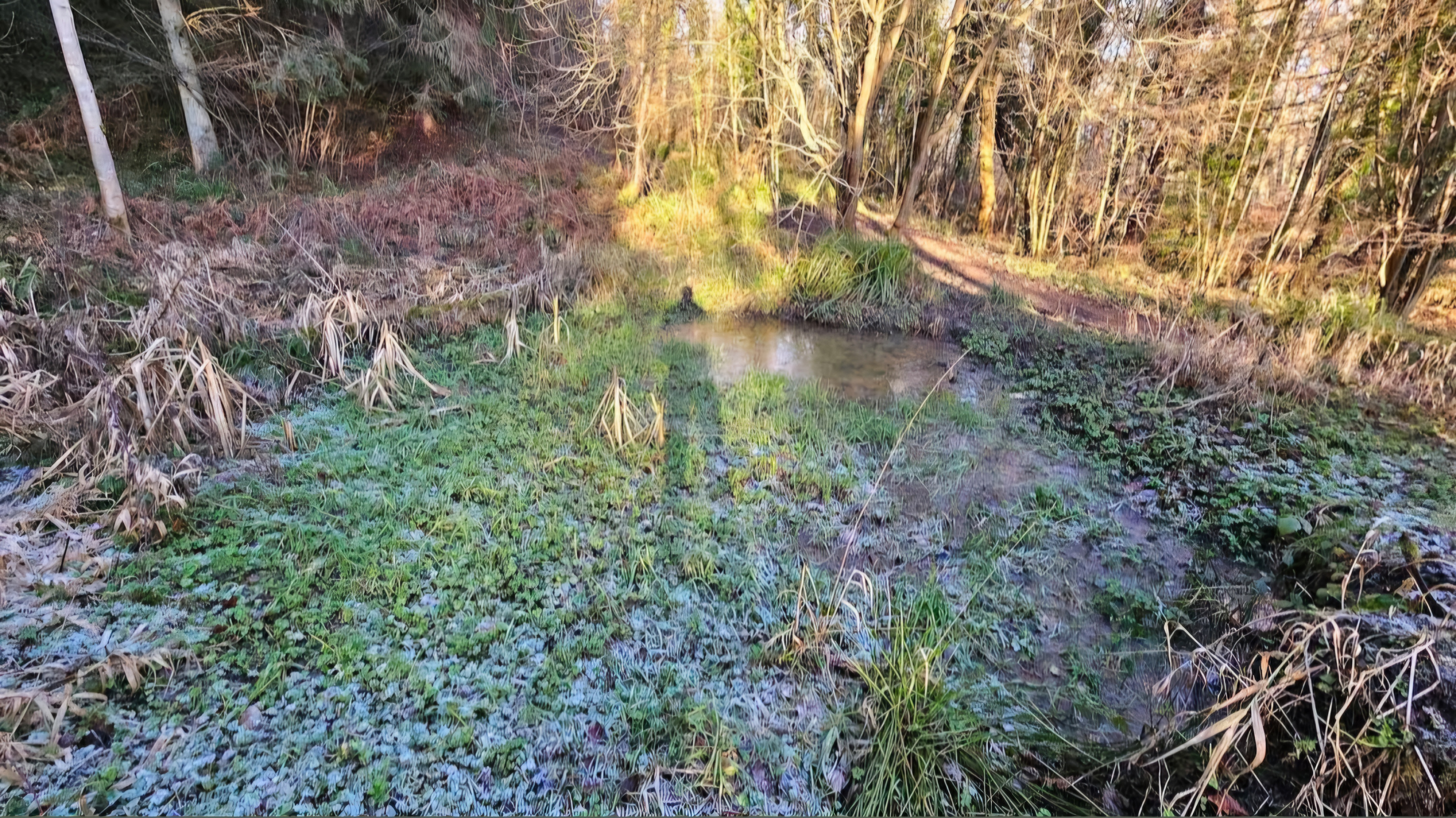
Price Pond, on the north bank of the River Derwent, slightly north of Shotley Bridge

The Derwent Walk is accessible from Blackhill to the south and from the road to Medomsley heading away from the Crown and Crossed Swords pub and A694 to the east. It also passes north eastward from Blackhill to the south of Shotley Bridge Hospital.

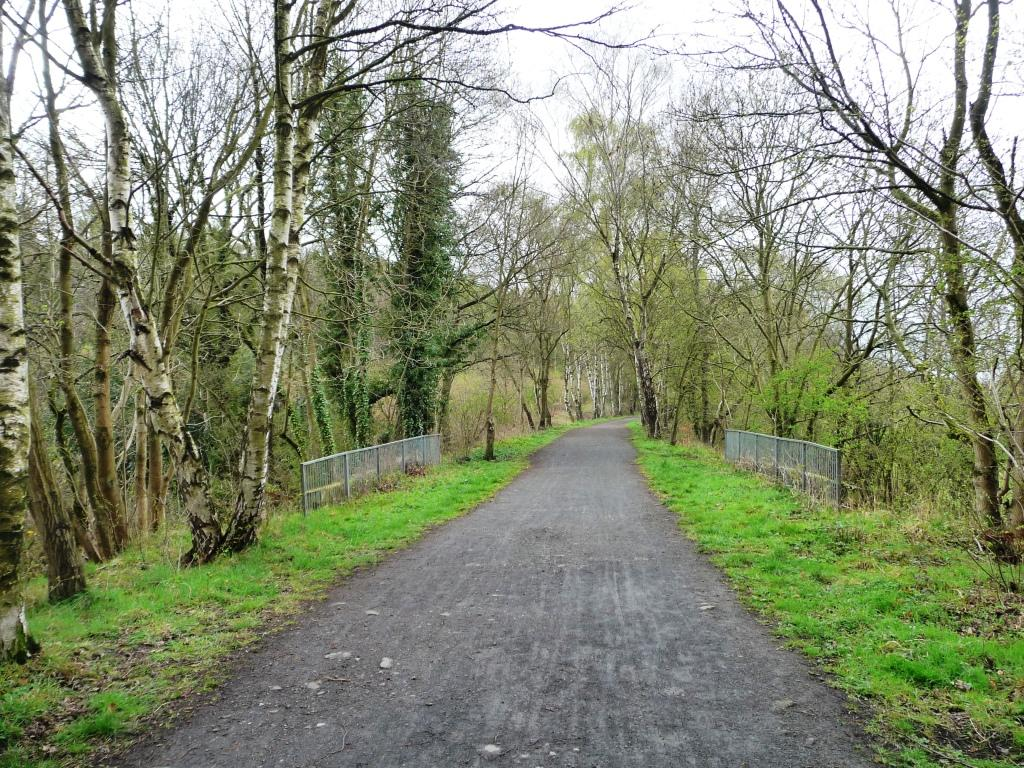
The Derwent Walk near Shotley Bridge Hospital

== Notable people ==
- Professional footballer Ben Clark was born in Shotley Bridge.
- Second World War flying ace Graham Hogg was born in Shotley Bridge.
- England Test cricketer Paul Collingwood played for Shotley Bridge Cricket Club in his youth.
- The Italian poet and writer Avro Manhattan spent his final years in Shotley Bridge, his wife's home town, and is buried there.
- England Rugby Union international Mathew Tait was born in Shotley Bridge.
