= Ebchester =

Village in County Durham, England

Coordinates: 54°53′N 1°50′W

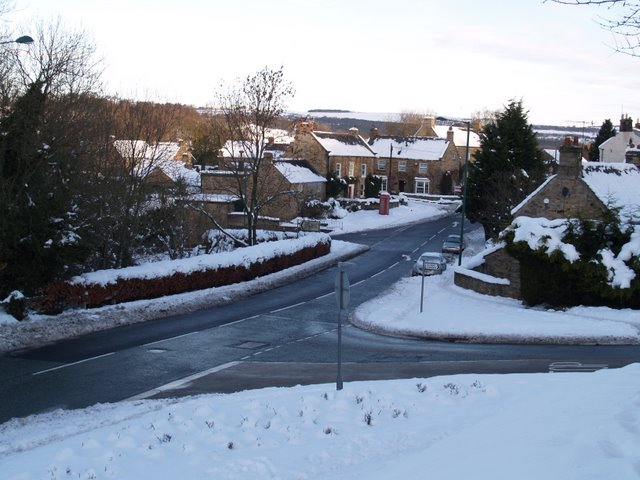

- Location within County Durham
- Unitary authority: County Durham
- Ceremonial county: County Durham
- Region: North East
- Country: England
- Sovereign state: United Kingdom
- Post town: CONSETT
- Postcode district: DH8
- Dialling code: 01207

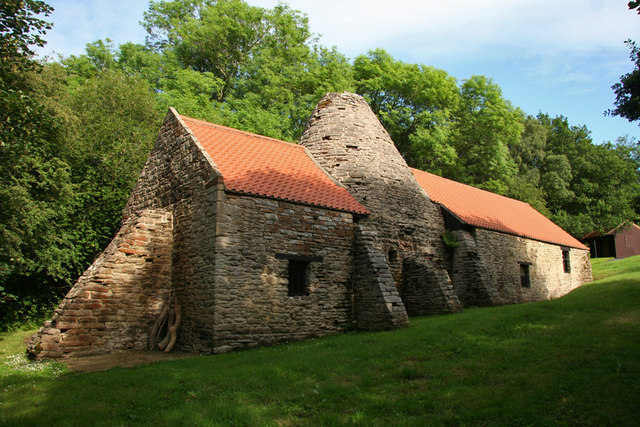
Derwentcote Steel Furnace

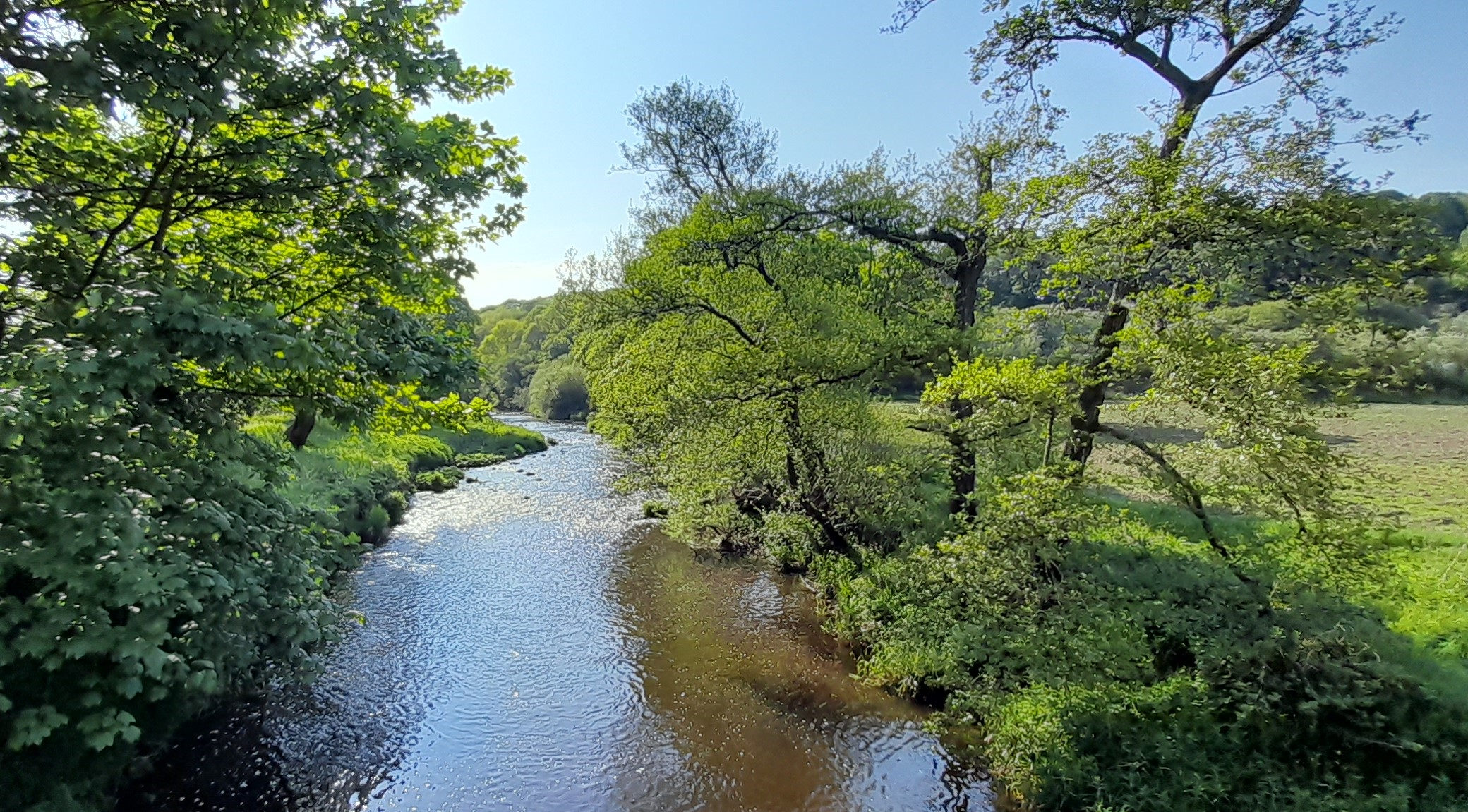
The River Derwent near Ebchester.

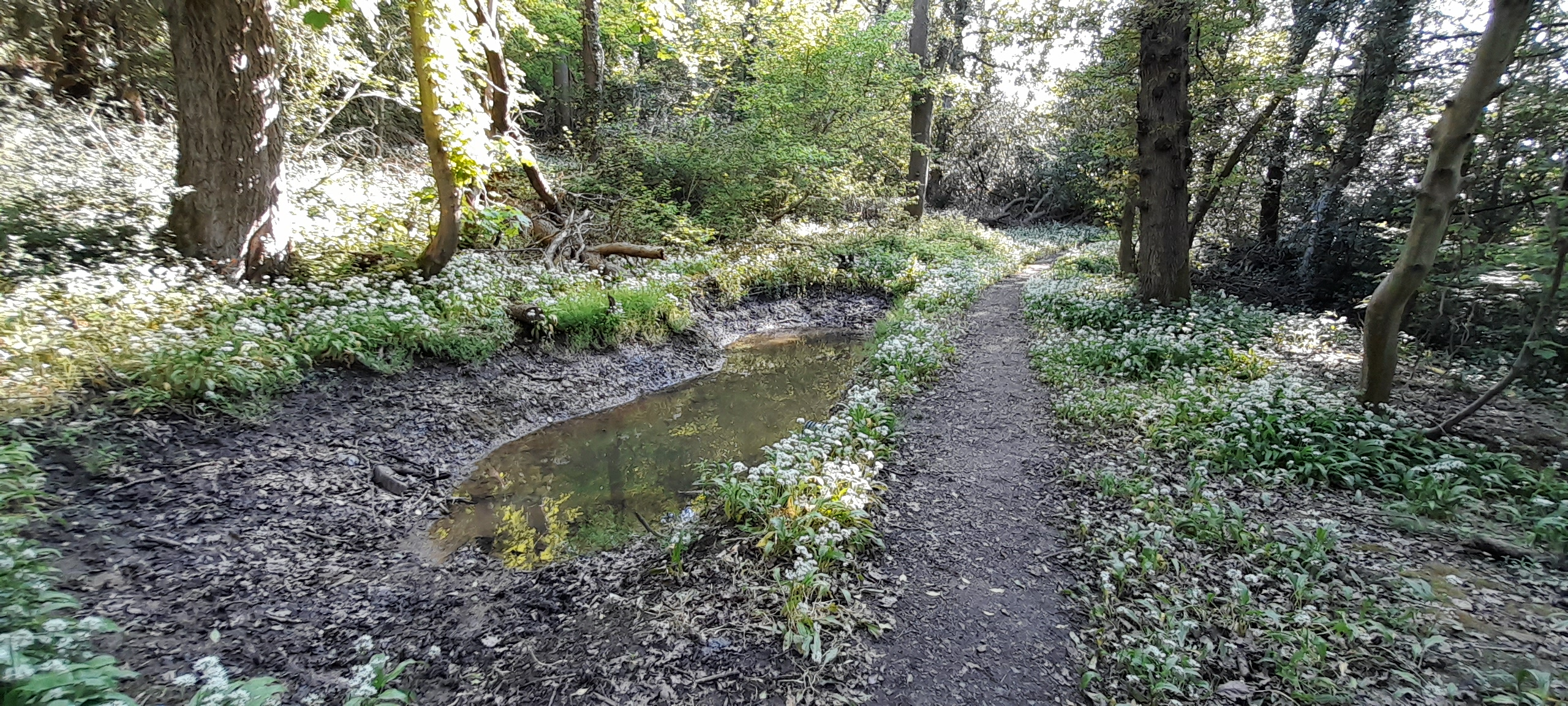
St. Ebba's Pond near the village of Ebchester.

Ebchester is a village in County Durham, England. It is situated to the north of Consett and Shotley Bridge. It also sits to the south east of Whittonstall and the hamlet of Newlands. Running north east to south west along the A694, Ebchester consists of Low Westwood, Ebchester itself and East Law.

The village proper sits at the intersection of the A694, which runs from Consett to Swalwell, and the B6309, which connects the A696 north of Belsay and runs through Whittonstall and Newlands, across the River Derwent (forming a border between County Durham and Northumberland), up Chare Bank then through Ebchester itself then past Medomsley into the A691 immediately south of the village of Leadgate.

Chopwell and Blackhall Mill lie to the north, on the opposite side of the River Derwent.

To the north east of Ebchester lies Derwentcote Steel Furnace. The River Derwent runs along the north west edge of the village.

Ebchester Rowing Club is based on the banks of the Derwent adjacent to the B6309 at the bottom of Chare Bank, using a section of river behind a weir across the Derwent for practice. The small St. Ebba's Pond (Google Maps), a man-made creation, can be found approximately 400 metres along a public footpath into the woods behind the rowing club, this footpath joining the A694 just to the north east of East Law.

The former Chelmsford pub can be found near the junction of the B6309 and A694, which is undergoing conversion to a house. The Derwent Walk Inn can be found up the bank from Ebchester on the B6309. This second pub is adjacent the Derwent Walk (national cycle route 14) running north east to south west to the south east of Ebchester and parallel to the A694, also running between Consett and Swawell. The Derwent Walk, a spur of the C2C cycle route, follows the route of the former Derwent Valley Railway and Ebchester railway station used to stand just to the north of the Derwent Walk Inn.

== Etymology ==
Chester derives from the Old English word for a Roman fortification. There have been some attempts to identify the first element with a Roman place name but on the available evidence it is safest to regard it as coming from an Old English personal name Ebba, thus 'Ebba's fortification'. It is possible that the ‘Ebba’ element refers to Æbbe (c. 615 – 683), an Anglian abbess and noblewoman. Æbbe was the daughter of Æthelfrith, who was king of Bernicia from c. 593 to 616. Æbbe founded monasteries at Ebchester and St Abb's Head, near Coldingham, in Scotland. At Coldingham it is thought she founded her monastery in the remains of a 6th-century fort. If the same was true at what is now known as Ebchester, this could explain the name Ebba's fortification.

== History ==
It is thought that the church of St Ebba was originally a monastery founded about this time by Æbbe of Coldingham, the daughter of Æthelfrith, the first king of Northumbria. Ebba soon moved on to be abbess of Coldingham, where she died in 683. The monastery was destroyed by Danish invaders. Consequently, there are no remains of this date, and the present church was mainly built in the early 11th century, using stone re-used from the Roman fort. The parish church is dedicated to St. Ebba, being of partly Norman construction with a foundation, described as being pre-Conquest. Much of the stone in the walls and doorway had been taken from Roman rubble of the fort of Vindomora, on which most of the village is located.

The church was restored in 1876 and a vestry was added in 1893 at the north-west end. It stands in the southern corner of the site of the fort. There has been relatively little research on the fort, though it is known that a simple mosaic was found here in the 1950s. Several Roman altars and other carved stones are known from the site of the church.

Until the creation of the separate parish of Shotley Bridge in the 19th century, many people from there were christened, married and buried in St Ebba's Church. Quite notably, these include many of the sword-makers from Shotley Bridge.

Ebchester Hall (an 18th-century house with 19th century additions) is now St Mary's Convent and old people's home served by the Order of the Good and Perpetual Succour.

The fort was known by the Roman name of Vindomora but sadly there is now little to be seen as most of the site has been built over. Although the fort went out of use by the end of the 4th century it is probable that the site was reused in the 7th century. During the medieval period the area remained rural. The isolated yet attractive landscape encouraged many hermits to come here and the area was once known as the 'place of the anchorites'. The River Derwent played an important part in the history of the village. Several water-powered mills are recorded in the 18th and 19th century. A corn mill stood in Mill Lane and a fulling mill and a stick mill are also known. Several bridges are also known. As well as the surviving bridges there was once a wooden bridge and another footbridge, though both have now disappeared.

The rural nature of the village continued throughout the post-medieval period and to the present day. The remains of several post-medieval buildings still survive, such as Demesne Farm and West Law and the large St Mary's Convent, formerly called Ebchester Hall.

Ebchester is also the location of a curious ghost story. The tale tells that in the early 18th century a local gentleman, Robert Johnson, had a row with his son and swore an oath, saying “I hope my right arm will burn off before I give my son a sixpence.” He soon made up with his son and many years later, when he was on his deathbed, he left all his land and property to him. This would all have been quite unremarkable except for events that occurred before the funeral. The house was full of guests paying their last respects and the body lay in a coffin in the front room. Suddenly the guests smelled burning and on investigation found that it came from the coffin. They opened the lid and found that, as he had sworn, Robert Johnson's arm was burning off!

== Governance ==
There is just one tier of local government covering Ebchester, the unitary authority of Durham County Council.

Ebchester was historically a chapelry in the ancient parish of Lanchester but became a separate parish in 1743. In 1931 the parish had a population of 823. On 1 April 1937 the parish was abolished and merged with Consett.

== Notable people from Ebchester ==
- Denise Welch, actress (Coronation Street and Waterloo Road) and TV presenter (Loose Women). Born in Tynemouth, her family moved to the village when Denise was a teenager.
- Henry Hetherington Emmerson, artist, although born in Chester-le-Street married and lived in the village.
- RS Surtees, writer, is buried in St Ebba's Churchyard.
