= Derwent Valley Railway (County Durham) =

UK railway company

The Derwent Valley Railway was a branch railway in County Durham, England. Built by the North Eastern Railway, it ran from Swalwell (now in Tyne and Wear) to Blackhill via five intermediate stations, and onwards to Consett.

== Background ==
In 1842, the Derwent Iron Company (DIC) had taken over the southern part of the former Stanhope and Tyne Railway. After the West Durham Railway constructed a line to Crook, the Stockton and Darlington Railway (S&DR) began construction of the Weardale Extension Railway to Crook, which opened on 8 November 1843, from a junction on its leased Weardale Railway. As a result, the DIC proposed an extension from Crook to the foot of the Meeting Slacks incline, which latter became Waskerley, to provide a southern shipping route for their lime and iron products. Having obtained an extension of their right of way from the Bishop of Durham, the DIC submitted the plans to the S&DR, who agreed to the extension as long as the DIC leased the entire southern section of the former S&TR to them. The Stanhope to Carrhouse section passed into the possession of the S&DR on 1 January 1845, with the completed 10-mile (16 km) Weardale Extension Railway from the Wear Valley Junction to Waskerley opening on 16 May 1845.

After the opening of the Weardale Extension Railway and the completion of Hownes Gill Viaduct under Thomas Bouch in 1858, the DIC had pressed the newly formed NER to link Consett with the River Tyne via Gateshead.

== History ==
Constructed as an extension of the existing Lanchester Valley Railway, the Lanchester Railway Extension as it was originally known was opened in 1867 after three years’ building work. Four viaducts were constructed and a deep, 800-metre (870 yd) long cutting was dug near Rowlands Gill. The Nine Arches Viaduct was one of the major engineering feats of the railway. It is 500 ft (150 m) long and was built because the Earl of Strathmore would not allow the railway to pass through the Gibside Estate.

At its peak in 1914 the railway was carrying over half a million passengers a year with a regular goods traffic of timber, bricks and coal to Newcastle and iron ore to Consett.

The railway is notable for an unsolved murder that occurred at Lintz Green railway station. The stationmaster, George Wilson, met his death on the night of 7 October 1911. No satisfactory explanation was ever forthcoming despite one of the most intensive murder investigations ever carried out in the North East of England.

High Westwood Station was closed in 1942 while the remaining stations survived into the 1950s. The line finally closed on 11 November 1963.

The railway is commemorated in the Geordie folk song about an ill-fated train journey from Rowlands Gill, Wor Nanny's a mazer.

== Present and future ==
Durham County Council have since developed the route into a multi-user path and Gateshead Council into the Derwent Walk country park, part of the Sustrans network of national foot and cycle paths. The viaducts and bridges were repaired and the entire trackbed, with the exception of a small section through Rowlands Gill where the cutting was infilled, has now become a section of the Sea to Sea Cycle Route.

In June 2020, MP for North West Durham, Richard Holden, sponsored a bid to the Ideas Fund of the Department for Transport's Restoring Your Railway Fund, hoping to access up to £50,000 to cover the cost of an initial study into the feasibility of restoring a rail link between Consett and Blaydon. In November 2020 it was announced that the requested funds would be provided for such a study into reinstating a rail service between Consett and Newcastle, although it was unclear whether this would focus entirely on the former Derwent Valley Railway or also include the former line via Birtley.
