= List of highest paved roads in Europe by country =

This is a list of the highest paved road and the highest paved pass in each European country.

== List ==
| Elevation | Name | Mountains | Country | type | between | remarks | location |
|---|---|---|---|---|---|---|---|
| c. 3300 m | Veleta | Sierra Nevada | Spain | dead end | | Access road from Granada. Free access until Hoya de la Mora at 2526m. From Hoya de la Mora onwards, the road gets much narrower and access to motor vehicles is restricted. Asphalt ends at c. 3300m but the road continues unpaved until reaching c. 3380m | 37°03′21″N 03°22′09″W |
| 2830 m | Ötztal Glacier Road | Ötztal Alps | Austria | dead end | | The highest paved road in Austria. The access road from Sölden to the Rettenbachferner and Tiefenbachferner glaciers | 46°55′29″N 10°56′40″E |
| 2802 m | Cime de la Bonette | French Alps | France | loop | | The highest paved road in France. Hors catégorie climb in the Tour de France | 44°19′18″N 6°48′25″E |
| 2770 m | Col de l'Iseran | Graian Alps | France | pass | Val-d'Isère & Bonneval-sur-Arc | The highest paved mountain pass in France. Hors catégorie climb in the Tour de France | 45°25′1″N 07°01′51″E |
| 2757 m | Stelvio Pass | Ortler Alps; Eastern Alps | Italy | pass | Stilfs & Bormio | The highest paved pass in Italy. The highest paved mountain pass in the Eastern Alps. Often designated the Cima Coppi in the annual running of the Giro d'Italia | 46°31′43″N 10°27′10″E |
| 2750 m | Kaunertal Glacier Road | Tiroler Oberland | Austria | dead end | | The access road to the Weißseeferner glacier | 46°51′51″N 10°42′48″E |
| 2641 m | Col du Nivolet; Colle del Nivolet | Graian Alps | Italy | dead end | Ceresole Reale (Piedmont) | Highest dead-end road in Italy (the paved road ends 1 km after the pass at the Nivolet lakes, and continues unpaved for some km but with no access to regular traffic). The film location in The Italian Job, including the final bus crash | 45°28′49″N 7°08′32″E |
| 2509 m | Timmelsjoch | Ötztal Alps | Austria; Italy | pass | Ötztal Tyrol (state) & Passeier valley (South Tyrol) | The highest pass in Austria | 46°54′19″N 11°5′48″E |
| 2501 m | Umbrail Pass | Ortler Alps; Eastern Alps | Switzerland; Italy | pass | Santa Maria Val Müstair & Stelvio Pass & Bormio | The highest pass in Switzerland | 46°32′35″N 10°26′02″E |
| 2408 m | Envalira Pass | Pyrenees | Andorra | pass | Soldeu & El Pas de la Casa (Andorra) and L'Hospitalet-près-l'Andorre (France) | The highest pass in Andorra. The high-pass is bypassed by the Envalira Tunnel | 42°32′24.2″N 1°43′10.58″E |
| 2394 m | Road to Kalin Reservoir | Rila | Bulgaria | dead end | Pastra village and Kalin Reservoir | Concrete-paved road to the highest reservoir in the Balkans | 42°10′21″N 23°15′3″E |
| 2379 m | Jvari Pass (Georgian Military Road) | Caucasus Mountains | Georgia | pass | Vladikavkaz (Russia) & Tbilisi (Georgia) | highest paved pass in Georgia | 42.5042°N 44.4538°E |
| 2155 m | Calar Alto | Sierra de los Filabres | Spain | pass | Gérgal & Tíjola | | 37°13′25″N 02°32′46″W |
| 2145 m | Transalpina Pass; Urdele pass | Carpathian Mountains | Romania | pass | Novaci, Romania & Sebes | highest paved road in Romania new asphalted in 2010 - excellent condition. http://www.transalpina.biz/ | 45.345°N 23.657°E |
| 2070 m | Voras (Kaimaktsalan) Ski Resort | Voras Mountains | Greece | dead end | Agios Athanasios to Voras Mountain ski resort | highest paved road in Greece | 40°54'48.4"N 21°48'32.6"E |
| 2055 m | Mangart road | Julian Alps | Slovenia | dead end | Log pod Mangrtom | The highest paved climb in Slovenia | 46.44°N 13.653889°E |
| 2042 m | Transfăgărășan | Făgăraș Mountains | Romania | pass | Pitești to Arpașu de Jos | featured on Top Gear | 45.5981°N 24.6165°E |
| 1993 m | Torre (Serra da Estrela) | Serra da Estrela | Portugal | pass | Covilhã & Seia | The highest pass in Portugal. Highest point in mainland Portugal | 40.321867°N 7.612967°W |
| 1952 m | Mount Olympus | Troodos | Cyprus | dead end | | Highest point in Cyprus. | 34°56′11″N 32°51′48″E |
| 1946 m | Kráľova hoľa | Low Tatras | Slovakia | dead end | | The highest paved road in Slovakia. | 48°52′58″N 20°08′19″E |
| 1853 m | Galdhøpiggvegen | Jotunheimen | Norway | Dead end | Bøverdalen & Juvasshytta | Highest road in Norway as well as Northern Europe. The road is private but usable by the public and paved. The last 9 km are tolled. See also List of highest roads in Norway. | 61.677088°N 8.363214°E |
| 1770 m | Fellhorn Ski station | Allgäu Alps | Germany | dead end | Oberstdorf | Highest road in Germany. Ski area. | 47.3491°N 10.2270°E |
| 1762 m | Biokovo road | Biokovo | Croatia | dead end | Makarska | Highest paved road in Croatia. | |
| c.1750 m | Popova Shapka, Tetovo, Macedonia | Šar Mountains | North Macedonia | dead end | Tetovo | Possibly the highest paved road in Macedonia. Paved status above and below village of Popova Shapka is not clear. | 42.015°N 20.882°E |
| 1611 m | Vršič Pass | Julian Alps | Slovenia | pass | Kranjska Gora & Soča | The highest pass in Slovenia, and the highest in the Eastern Julian Alps | 46°26′8″N 13°44′40″E |
| 1609 m | Val d'Ese | Corsica | France | dead end | Bastelica | Highest road on the island of Corsica | 41°59′58″N 9°7′26″E |
| 1600 m | Malbun | Alps | Liechtenstein | dead end | road from Steg and Vaduz, (Triesenberg) | Highest road in Liechtenstein. Ski area | 47°6′7.2″N 9°36′28.8″E |
| 1520 m | Beklemeto Pass | Balkan Mountains | Bulgaria | pass | Troyan & Karnare | | 42°46′50″N 24°36′21″E |
| 1492 m | Praděd | Hrubý Jeseník | Czech Republic | dead end | road from Karlova Studánka | Highest paved road in Czech Republic | 50°4′59.2″N 17°13′51.7″E |
| 1448 m | Nikitskyy Pass | Crimean Mountains | Ukraine | pass | P34 road from Sovjets'ke and Rozovyi | Highest paved road in Ukraine. Private road. | 44°56′27″N 34°20′2″E |
| 1434 m | Sognefjellsvegen | Jotunheimen | Norway | pass | Road 55 Sogndalsfjøra - Lom | Highest road owned by the public in Norway as well as Northern Europe. Not tolled. Closed in winter | 61.565718°N 8.006372°E |
| 1410 m | Morskie Oko | Tatra Mountains | Poland | dead end | Brzegi | Highest road in Poland. Owned by Tatra National Park, available only for pedestrians. | 49°11′50″N 20°4′15″E |
| 1340 m | Monte Limbara | Sardinia | Italy | dead end | Tempio Pausania | Highest road on the island of Sardinia | 40°50′59″N 9°10′31″E |
| 1232 m | Čertovica | Low Tatras | Slovakia | pass | Podbrezová & Kráľova Lehota | The highest pass in Slovakia | 48°54′20″N 19°44′9″E |
| 995 m | Kékes | Mátra, North Hungarian Mountains | Hungary | dead end | northeast of Gyöngyös | The highest public and the highest paved road in Hungary. Climbs to ski station on Hungary's highest mountain. First-category climb of the Tour de Hongrie. | 47°52′44″N 20°0′37″E |
| 876 m | Stekenjokk | Scandinavian Mountains | Sweden | pass | Gäddede & Klimpfjäll | The highest public and paved road in Sweden. (Note that Flatruet at 62.739126°N 12.740179°E is the highest public road at 975 m but not paved as of 2014). See also Highest roads in Sweden. | 65.062687°N 14.37767°E |
| 840 m | Great Dun Fell | Pennines | England | dead end | Knock, Cumbria, Dufton | The highest paved road in England. A private metalled road to Radar station | 54.68311°N 2.45132°W |
| 796 m | Mount Leinster | Blackstairs Mountains | Ireland | dead end | Carlow & Wexford | The highest paved road in Ireland. | 52.617°N 6.778°W |
| 780 m | Route 910 | Mid-Atlantic Ridge | Iceland | pass | Egilsstaðir & Kárahnjúkar | The highest paved road in Iceland (there are several higher unpaved roads, often requiring 4x4 cars, of which the highest is F821 at 944m)) | 64.8857°N 15.5877°W |
| 757 m | Kippure | Wicklow Mountains | Ireland | dead end | Wicklow | The second highest paved road in Ireland | |
| 710 m | Mátraháza | Mátra, North Hungarian Mountains | Hungary | pass | northeast of Gyöngyös towards Parád | The highest paved pass in Hungary, on Route 24 at the foot of the road to the Kékes ski station on Hungary's highest mountain | 47.870°N 19.978°E |
| 694 m | Signal de Botrange | High Fens | Belgium | road | Eupen & Waimes | The highest point in Belgium | 50°30′06″N 6°05′34″E |
| 670 m | Cairnwell Pass | Scottish Highlands | Scotland | pass | Glen Shee, Perthshire, and Braemar, Aberdeenshire | The highest pass in Scotland | 56.8862°N 3.4146°W |
| 627 m | Harthope Moss; Chapel Fell | Pennines | England | pass | Langdon Beck & St John's Chapel, County Durham | The equal highest pass in England | 54°42′33″N 2°12′57″W |
| 627 m | Killhope Cross | Pennines | England | pass | Cornriggs, (Weardale) & Nenthead, Alston, Cumbria | The equal highest pass in England | 54°47′01″N 2°18′48″W |
| 566 m | Muotkatakka | Scandinavian Mountains | Finland | pass | E8 Kilpisjärvi & Kaaresuvanto, Enontekiö | The highest point of Finnish roads | 68.926°N 20.935°E |
| 559 m | Buurgplaatz | Ardennes | Luxembourg | road | Wemperhaardt and Huldange | Highest paved road in Luxembourg. It is also possible to drive to the top of the Kneiff (560 m, highest point of Luxembourg) but the last few metres are unpaved. | 50.1615°N 6.0281°E |
| 549 m | Gospel Pass | Black Mountains | Wales | pass | Hay-on-Wye and Capel-y-ffin | The highest pass in Wales. | 52.010149°N 3.115462°W |
| 545 m | Bwlch y Groes | Snowdonia | Wales | pass | Llanymawddwy and Llanuwchllyn | Second highest pass in Wales. | 52.795833°N 3.613056°W |
| 523 m | R115 road (Ireland) (Sally Gap) | Wicklow Mountains | Ireland | pass | | The highest pass in Ireland, over the Sally Gap County Wicklow | 53.160499°N 6.304718°W |
| 385 m | Bwlch y Gorddian | Snowdonia | Wales | road | Blaenau Ffestiniog and Dolwyddelan | Occasionally closed during winter storms | 52.4745°N 3.93816°W |
| 322 m | Vaalserberg | Heuvelland | Netherlands | road | Vaals & Plombières & Aachen | The highest road in the European Netherlands. The tripoint between Germany, Belgium and the Netherlands | 50°45′17″N 6°01′15″E |
| 318 m | Suur Munamägi ("Big Egg Mountain") | Estonia | Estonia | road up a hill | Haanja Parish, (Võru County) | The highest road in Estonia | 57°42′52″N 27°03′33″E |
| 312 m | Gaiziņkalns | Vidzeme | Latvia | road | Madona, Vidzeme | The highest road in Latvia. Ski area. | 56°52′12.93″N 25°57′33.68″E |
| 293 m | Aukštojas Hill | Medininkai Highlands | Lithuania | road | Medininkai | The highest point in Lithuania | 54°31′46″N 25°38′04″E |
| 170 m | Ejer Bavnehøjvej | | Denmark | road | Ejer Bavnehøj; Skanderborg municipality | The highest road in Denmark | 55.977706°N 9.829309°E |
| 160+ m | Les Révoires/Mont Agel | Maritime Alps | France; Monaco | road | Les Révoires to Monte Carlo Golf Club, Mont Agel | Les Révoires is the highest point in Monaco in the foothills of Mount Agel (1,148 m) (France) | 43°46′31″N 7°25′35″E |

== Highest motorways by country ==
| Elevation | Name | Mountains | Country | type | between | location |
|---|---|---|---|---|---|---|
| 1875 m | Great St Bernard Tunnel | Alps | Italy; Switzerland | pass | Aosta – Martigny | 45°51′52″N 07°10′21″E |
| 1631 m | A13 motorway (San Bernardino Tunnel) | Alps | Switzerland | pass | St. Margrethen – Ascona | 46°27′53″N 09°11′08″E |
| 1440 m | A-1 Puerto de Somosierra | Central System | Spain | pass | Madrid – Burgos | |
| 1340 m | Tauern motorway (Tauern Tunnel) | Alps | Austria | pass | Salzburg – Villach | 47°10′55″N 13°26′19″E |
| 1395 m | Mont Blanc Tunnel | Alps | France | pass | Chamonix – Courmayeur | 45.854°N 6.914°E |
| 1070 m | E801/A24 | Serra do Marão | Portugal | pass | Vila Pouca de Aguiar – Vila Real, Portugal | 41°25′01″N 07°38′23″W |
| 970 m | Hemus motorway (Vitinya Pass) | Balkan Mountains | Bulgaria | pass | Sofia – Botevgrad | 42°46′53″N 23°47′58″E |
| 914 m | Autobahn A 7 (near Nesselwang) | Bavarian Alps | Germany | pass | Ulm – Füssen | |
| 906 m | D1 Highway | Liptov | Slovakia | pass | Liptovský Mikuláš – Poprad | 49°04′04″N 20°02′59″E |
| 670 m | European route E55 (Panenská Tunnel) | Ore Mountains | Czech Republic | pass | Ústí nad Labem – Dresden | 50°45′29″N 13°58′29″E |
| 372 m | M62 motorway | Pennines | England | pass | Milnrow - Rishworth | 53.62982°N 2.018561°W |
| 325 m | M74 motorway (Wedder Law) | Southern Uplands | Scotland | pass | Lesmahagow - Abington | 55.5343°N 3.7816°W |
| 305 m | Road 40 | South Swedish highlands | Sweden | pass | just east of Ulricehamn | 57°48′18″N 13°27′55″E |
| 300 m | European route E16 | Scandinavian Mountains | Norway (Note: A motorway at over 400 altitude is under construction near Berkåk, to be opened 2027) | pass | Oslo – Hønefoss | 59°58′27″N 10°19′58″E |
| 180 m | A76 | Ardennes | Netherlands | pass | near Huls | 50°50′57″N 5°58′50″E |
| 120 m | European route E45 | Søhøjlandet | Denmark | pass | near Tebstrup, Horsens – Aarhus | 55°58′36″N 09°52′02″E |

== See also ==
- List of highest paved roads in Europe
- List of highest points of European countries
- List of mountain passes
- Transport in Europe
