= Vildmarksvägen =

Road in Sweden

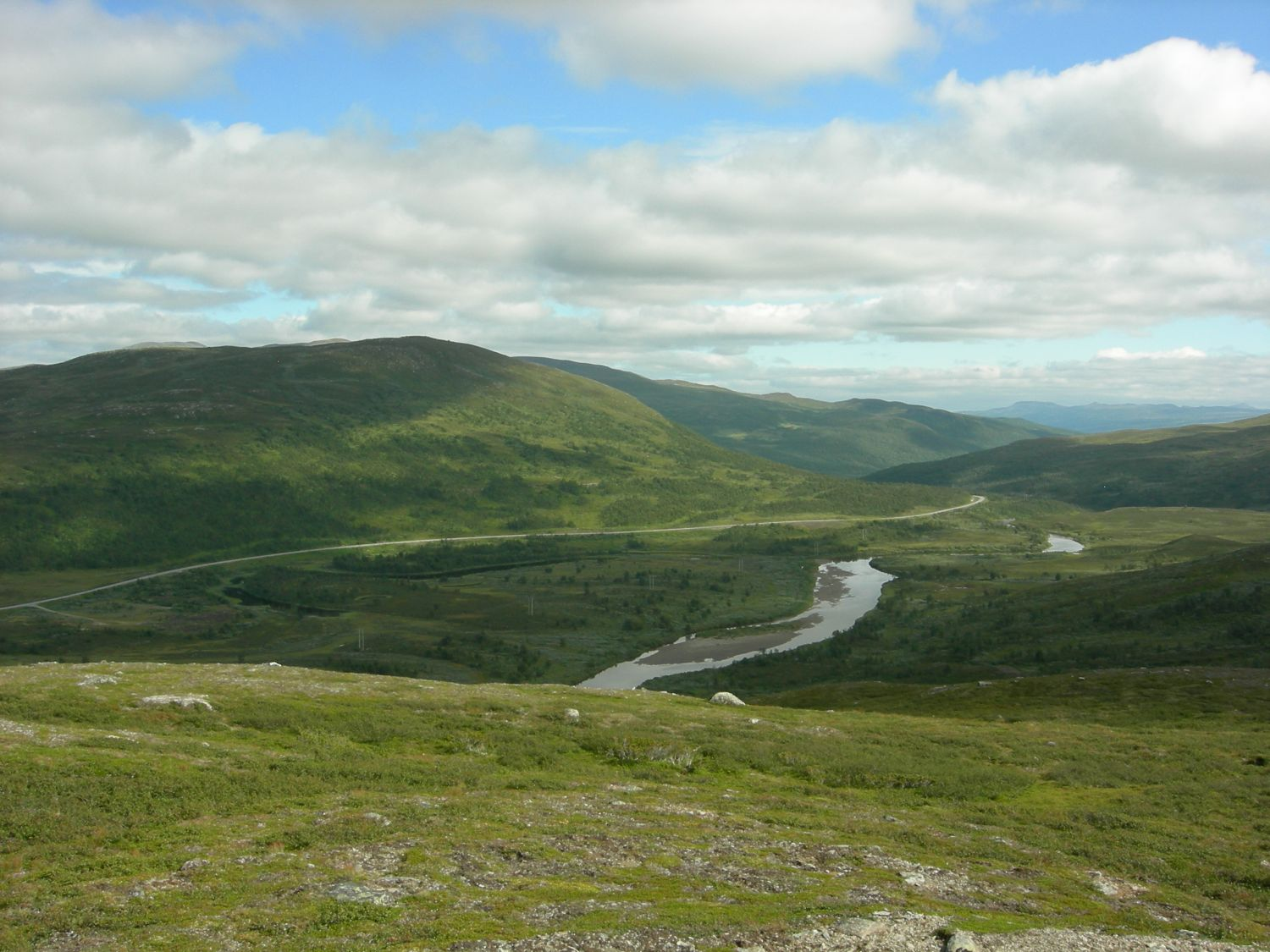
Vildmarksvägen between Stekenjokk and Klimpfjäll.

Vildmarksvägen (English: The Wilderness Road), locally known as Stekenjokkvägen after the mountain pass of Stekenjokk is a tourist road stretching from northern Jämtland to southern Lapland, Sweden. It begins in Strömsund and ends in Vilhelmina. Part of the road is closed during winter at times because of heavy snow, which can reach up to 7 metres (23 ft). In 2012, the Frostvikens Fjällpark was open in Gäddede as part of the Vildmarksvägen. Vildmarksvägen also hosts the Bjurälven nature reserve. Part of the road is above the tree line.

== Route ==
The 360 kilometres (220 mi) route of Vildmarksvägen begins in Strömsund. It continues to the town of Gäddede and Road 342, then passes through Jormvattnet, Stora Blåsjön, and Stekenjokk, and on to Klimpfjäll. From there it continues to Kultsjön and Saxnäs via Stalon and Lake Moalgomaj, on to Vilhelmina. Parts of the road through Kalfjället are closed at times during winter because of heavy snow, and the Stekkenjokk plateau is also closed from mid-October to the beginning of June.

=== Highlights ===
The Vildmarksvägen crosses a region that has the greatest concentration of bears in Sweden.

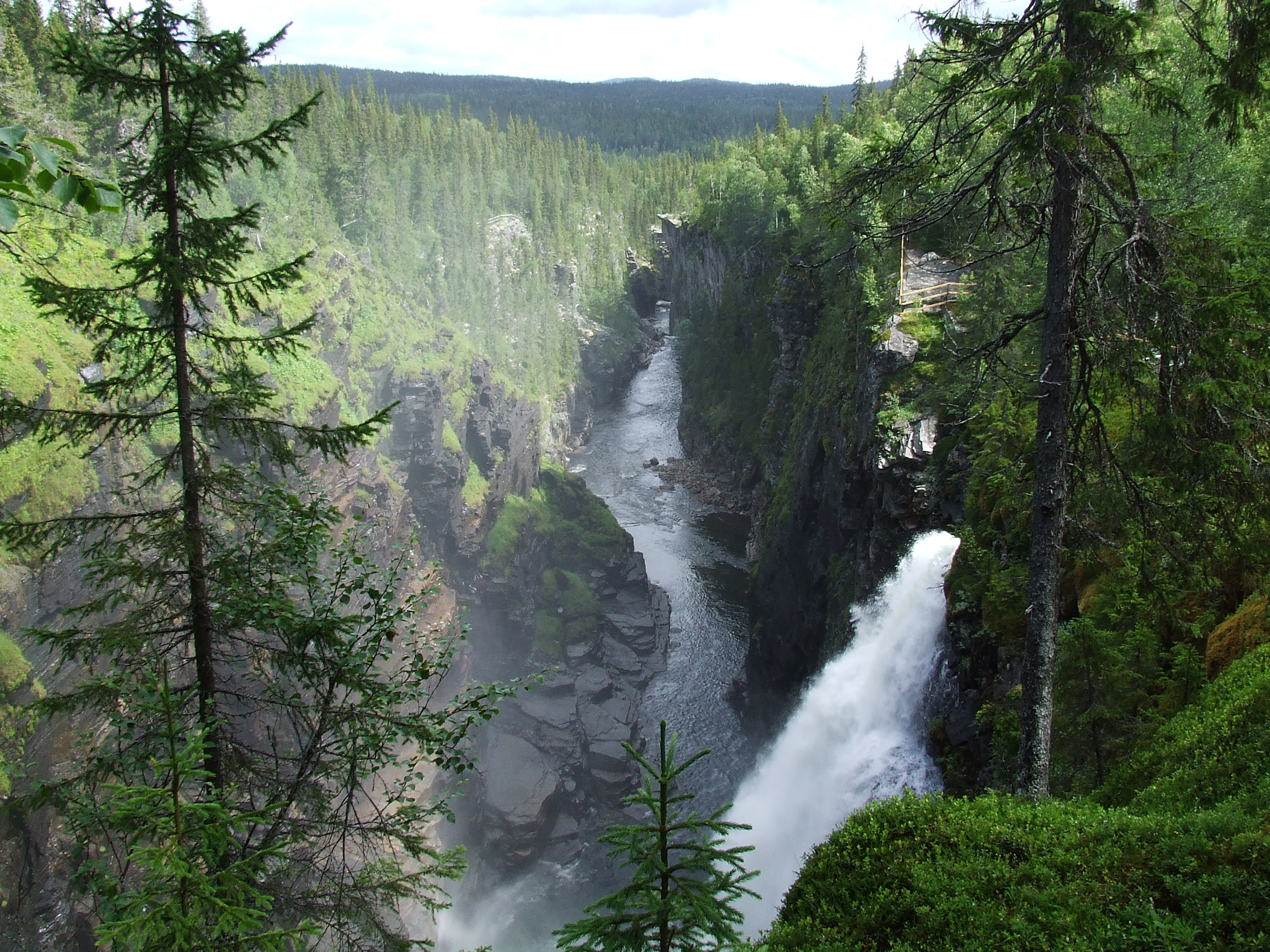
Hällingsåfallet waterfall and canyon

The area spanned by the road is very scenic and has many rivers and waterfalls. One of the waterfalls, Hällingsåfallet (which also is a nature reserve), drains into the longest water canyon of Northern Europe. With a drop of 43 metres (141 ft), Hällingsåfallet has been called "Sweden's answer to Niagara Falls". Hällingsåfallet's canyon is 800 metres (2,600 ft) long and, due to ongoing soil erosion, its length is still increasing.

Vildmarksvägen passes near Gaustafallet, another waterfall which also drains into a gorge. This waterfall was one of the locations for a film by Astrid Lindgren, titled Ronia the Robber's Daughter. Although the area is similar in size to Västra Götaland County, which has a population of 1,590,000, the population in the wilderness area is only 22,000, resulting in a population density of less than 1 person per km^{2}.

The waterfall of Brakkåfallet is located on the route of Vildmarksvägen between Jorm and Stora Blåsjön. Sweden's longest cave, the Korallgrottan is found between Stora Blåsjön and Ankarvattnet along Vildmarksvägen.

As Vildmarksvägen winds eastward it passes near the Sami village of Fatmomakke, a community built with a church at its centre. The community lives in 80 traditional goahti as well as 20 more modern homes which are constructed radially around the church. Twenty wooden huts are also found on the shore of Kultsjön lake. There is also a visningskåta, model hut, built on an elevation near the church.

Along the route between Strömsund and Gäddede are several outdoor military museums. Skansen Alanäs is one of four sites (the others being Skansen Storån, Skansen Sjulsåsen and Skansen Fågelberget) which can be visited as part of a bunker tour in the area. These military installations were built between 1940 and 1945 to defend the area against German invasion during World War II. Guided tours are held during the summer months.

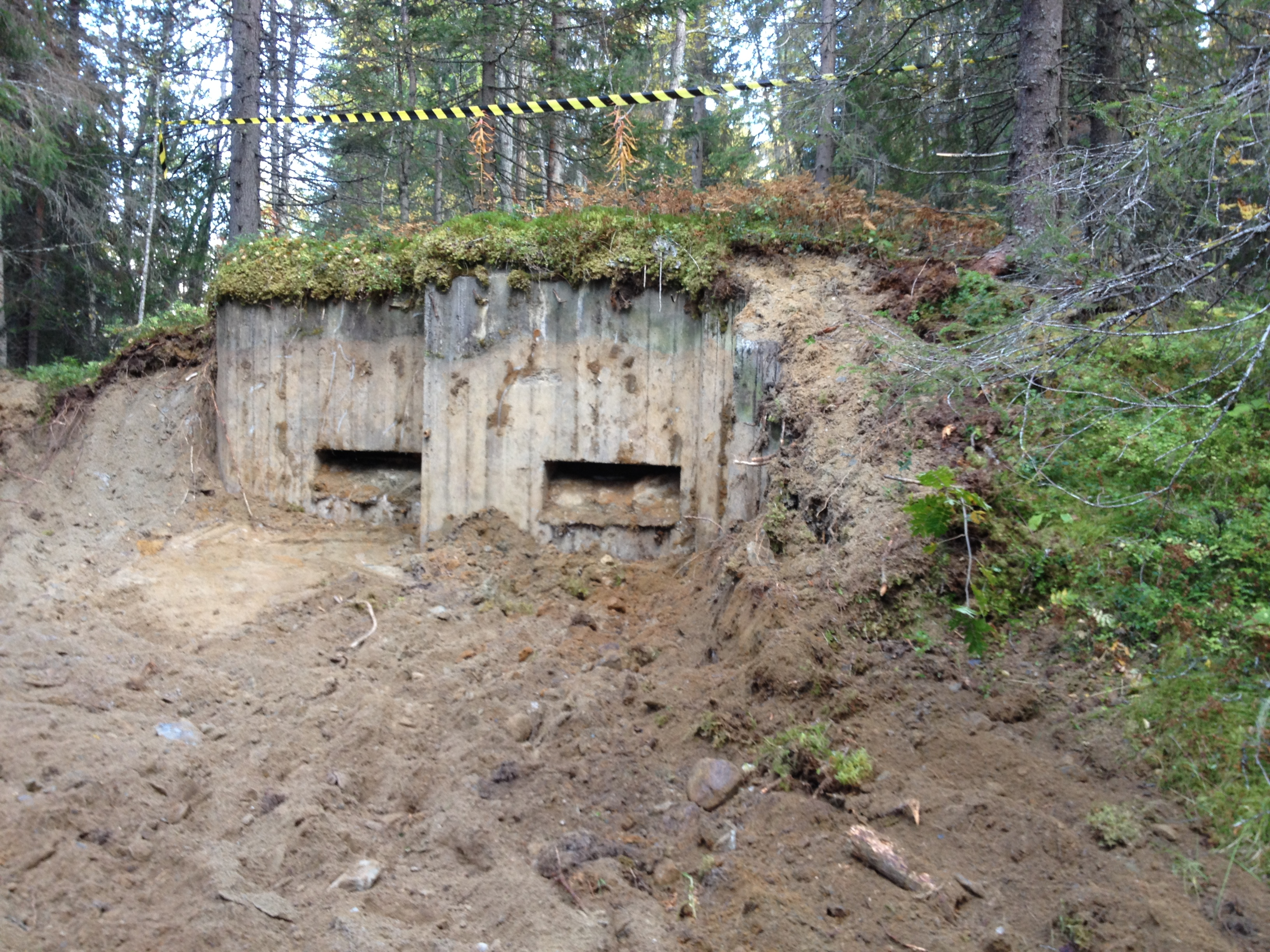
Bunker in Alanäs

Because of its altitude, mosquitoes and gnats do not exist in the region.
