= Stora Blåsjön =

Hamlet in Sweden

Coordinates: 64.837°N 14.083°E

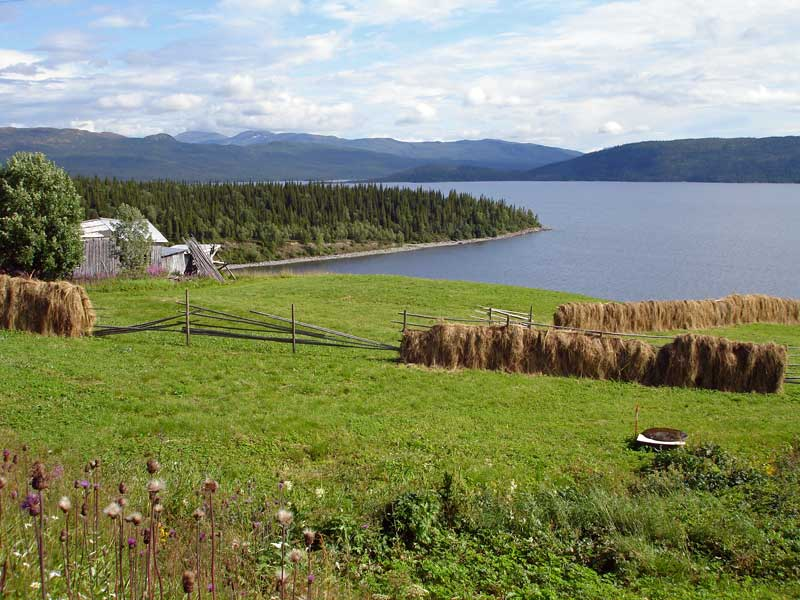
View of Stora Blåsjön

Stora Blåsjön (English: Big Blue Lake) is a hamlet in Frostviken, Strömsund Municipality, Jämtland, Sweden. The area is known for its wilderness and skiing opportunities. Vildmarksvägen, a 360 kilometres (220 mi) wilderness road, bypasses the hamlet. Stora Blåsjön has a moose farm and a school museum.

== Location ==
Stora Blåsjön is located about 280 kilometres (170 mi) north of Östersund and 6 kilometres (3.7 mi) from Sweden's border with Norway. The Vildmarksvägen road passes from the north of Stora Blåsjön and motorists driving to the village using the wilderness road first encounter the lake, which mirrors the nearby Mesklumpen mountain that is situated in close proximity to the village.

== History ==
Stora Blåsjön was founded in 1799 by a farmer from Norway and another from the hamlet of Jormvattnet. During the 1950s, the population was about 200 people, the highest number of permanent residents in Stora Blåsjön's history. As of July 2010, it was referred the population was 78 residents.

Stora Blåsjön became nationally known in 1971 when about 20 workers from the copper mine in Stekenjokk went on a hunger strike in the town after not being paid for their work at the mine.

== Description ==
The hamlet has a local shop, gas station, restaurant, cafe and hairdresser. Chalet rental is available and there is a ski lift.

The lake beside the hamlet is known for its trout fishing. The lake is divided into two segments, Stora Blåsjön and Lilla Blåsjön (English: Little Blue Lake). The rivers Ankarälven and Lejarälven are tributaries to the lake. The level of the lake is artificially adjusted by allowing water to flow out. The water outflow passes through Blåsjöälven and is further directed through an underground waterway to the generating station at Blåsjöfallet, finally draining into Lake Stor-Jorm. Local fish species include trout and charr.

== Attractions ==
Around Stora Blåsjön there is a lot of wilderness where guests can go on walks, hunt, or fish. The waterfall of Brakkåfallet is located on the route of the Vildmarksvägen between Stora Blåsjön and Jorm. Sweden's longest cave, the Korallgrottan (English: Coral Cave) is found between Stora Blåsjön and Ankarvattnet along Vildmarksvägen.

In spring, summer and on holidays, the town's residency increases with guests arriving to occupy the chalets. Skiing at Stora Blåsjön is done at the Mesklumpen mountain site, which features a drop of 525 metres (1,722 ft) and is in fourth place amongst the skiing sites of Sweden in terms of vertical drop, after Åre, Hemavan and Björkliden. A moose farm, called "Mountain Moose", is located in the center of town. The farm features guided tours during which a family of moose led by two moose called Hilda and Herbert is introduced to visitors.
