= 2020 CCC Team season =

Cycling team season

CCC Team
- 2020 season
- UCI code: CCC
- Status: UCI WorldTeam
- Manager: Jim Ochowicz
- Main sponsor(s): CCC
- Based: Poland
- Bicycles: Giant
- Groupset: Shimano

Season victories
- Stage race overall: 1
- Stage race stages: 6
- National Championships: 2
- Most wins: Attila Valter (5)
- Jersey

The 2020 season for the CCC Pro Team began in January with the Tour Down Under.

== Team roster ==
As of 19 August 2020.

Rider	Date of birth
Will Barta (USA)	January 4, 1996 (aged 23)
Patrick Bevin (NZL)	February 15, 1991 (aged 28)
Josef Černý (CZE)	May 11, 1993 (aged 26)
Víctor de la Parte (ESP)	June 22, 1986 (aged 33)
Alessandro De Marchi (ITA)	May 19, 1986 (aged 33)
Simon Geschke (GER)	March 13, 1986 (aged 33)
Kamil Gradek (POL)	September 17, 1990 (aged 29)
Jan Hirt (CZE)	January 21, 1991 (aged 28)
Jonas Koch (GER)	June 25, 1993 (aged 26)
Pavel Kochetkov (RUS)	March 7, 1986 (aged 33)
Jakub Mareczko (ITA)	April 30, 1994 (aged 25)
Fausto Masnada (Note: After CCC Team were unable to secure a title sponsor for the 2021 season, they allowed Masnada to make a mid-season transfer to Deceuninck–Quick-Step on 19 August.) (ITA)	November 6, 1993 (aged 26)
Kamil Małecki (POL)	January 2, 1996 (aged 23)
Michał Paluta (POL)	October 4, 1995 (aged 24)

Rider	Date of birth
Serge Pauwels (BEL)	November 21, 1983 (aged 36)
Joey Rosskopf (USA)	September 5, 1989 (aged 30)
Szymon Sajnok (POL)	August 24, 1997 (aged 22)
Michael Schär (SUI)	September 29, 1986 (aged 33)
Matteo Trentin (ITA)	August 2, 1989 (aged 30)
Attila Valter (HUN)	June 12, 1998 (aged 21)
Greg Van Avermaet (BEL)	May 17, 1985 (aged 34)
Gijs Van Hoecke (BEL)	November 12, 1991 (aged 28)
Nathan Van Hooydonck (BEL)	October 12, 1995 (aged 24)
Guillaume Van Keirsbulck (BEL)	February 14, 1991 (aged 28)
Francisco Ventoso (ESP)	May 6, 1982 (aged 37)
Łukasz Wiśniowski (POL)	December 7, 1991 (aged 28)
Ilnur Zakarin (RUS)	September 15, 1989 (aged 30)
Georg Zimmermann (GER)	October 11, 1997 (aged 22)

Riders who joined the team for the 2020 season

Rider	2019 team
Jan Hirt	Astana
Pavel Kochetkov	Team Katusha–Alpecin
Fausto Masnada	Androni Giocattoli–Sidermec
Kamil Małecki	CCC Development Team
Michał Paluta	CCC Development Team
Matteo Trentin	Mitchelton–Scott
Attila Valter	neo-pro (CCC Development Team)
Ilnur Zakarin	Team Katusha–Alpecin
Georg Zimmermann	neo-pro (Tirol KTM Cycling Team)

Riders who left the team during or after the 2019 season

Rider	2020 team
Amaro Antunes	W52 / FC Porto
Paweł Bernas	Mazowsze Serce Polski
Łukasz Owsian	Arkéa–Samsic
Laurens ten Dam	Retired (gravel racing)
Riccardo Zoidl	Team Felbermayr–Simplon Wels

== Season victories ==
Date	Race	Competition	Rider	Country	Location
25 January	Tour Down Under, Mountains classification	UCI World Tour	Joey Rosskopf (USA)	Australia	
9 February	Étoile de Bessèges, Mountains classification	UCI Europe Tour	Georg Zimmermann (GER)	France	
16 February	Tour de la Provence, Mountains classification	UCI Europe Tour; UCI ProSeries	Jonas Koch (GER)	France	
23 February	Tour des Alpes-Maritimes et du Var, Young rider classification	UCI Europe Tour	Attila Valter (HUN)	France	
29 August	Tour Poitou-Charentes en Nouvelle-Aquitaine, Stage 3b	UCI Europe Tour	Josef Černý (CZE)	France	Jaunay-Marigny
30 August	Tour Poitou-Charentes en Nouvelle-Aquitaine, Teams classification	UCI Europe Tour	(Note: The riders in the squad were Will Barta, Josef Černý, Joey Rosskopf, Szymon Sajnok, Gijs Van Hoecke, Guillaume Van Keirsbulck and Francisco Ventoso.)	France	
30 August	Tour de Hongrie, Stage 2	UCI Europe Tour	Jakub Mareczko (ITA)	Hungary	Hajdúszoboszló
31 August	Tour de Hongrie, Stage 3	UCI Europe Tour	Jakub Mareczko (ITA)	Hungary	Nyíregyháza
1 September	Tour de Hongrie, Stage 4	UCI Europe Tour	Jakub Mareczko (ITA)	Hungary	Kazincbarcika
2 September	Tour de Hongrie, Stage 5	UCI Europe Tour	Attila Valter (HUN)	Hungary	Gyöngyös (Kékestető)
2 September	Tour de Hongrie, Overall	UCI Europe Tour	Attila Valter (HUN)	Hungary	
2 September	Tour de Hongrie, Points classification	UCI Europe Tour	Jakub Mareczko (ITA)	Hungary	
2 September	Tour de Hongrie, Mountains classification	UCI Europe Tour	Attila Valter (HUN)	Hungary	
2 September	Tour de Hongrie, Hungarian rider classification	UCI Europe Tour	Attila Valter (HUN)	Hungary	
23 October	Giro d'Italia, Stage 19	UCI World Tour	Josef Černý (CZE)	Italy	Asti

== National, Continental and World champions ==
Date	Discipline	Jersey	Rider	Country	Location
20 August	Czech National Time Trial Championships		Josef Černý (CZE)	Czech Republic	Mladá Boleslav
20 August	Polish National Time Trial Championships		Kamil Gradek (POL)	Poland	Busko-Zdrój
