= Kékes =

Hungary's highest mountain

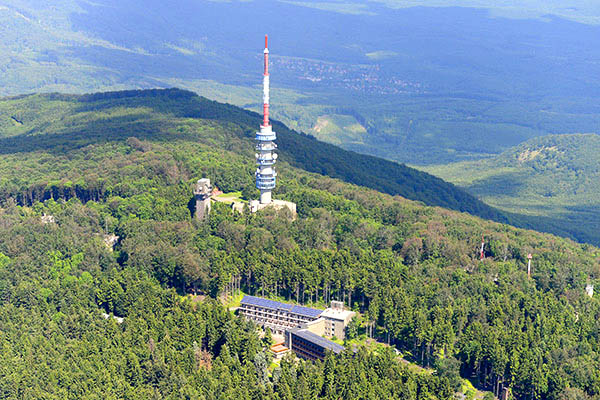

Highest point
- Elevation: 1,014 m (3,327 ft)
- Prominence: 774 m (2,539 ft)
- Listing: Country high point
- Coordinates: 47°52′44″N 20°0′37″E

Naming
- English translation: Bluish
- Language of name: Hungarian

Geography
- Location within Hungary
- Parent range: Mátra, Western Carpathians

Kékes [ˈkeːkɛʃ] is Hungary's highest mountain, at 1,014 metres (3,327 ft) above sea level in the Mátra mountain range. It is Hungary's third most popular tourist attraction, after Lake Balaton and the Danube, and has a number of skiing pistes. The Kékestető TV Tower stands at the summit. Kékestető is a resort place surrounding the summit, and is part of the town of Gyöngyös in Heves county. It is 18 km away from the town center. As of the 2022 census, it has a population of 14. The resort is reachable by bus from Budapest.

== History ==
The Hungarian Carpathian Association built a 20 m high wooden watchtower at east of the summit in 1889. With the Treaty of Trianon, Kékes became the highest mountain in the country in 1920. Before that, the Gerlachovský štít was the highest peak of the Kingdom of Hungary. The watchtower was rebuilt and named after József Vass in 1926. The Kékes luxury hotel, the meteorological station and the road to Mátraháza were built in 1934. The watchtower was demolished in 1938. The luxury hotel was converted into a sanatorium in 1951 and the trade union resort was built. The skiers' houses were built in 1953. A 65-meter TV tower, made of andesite, was handed over in 1960. A new 178-meter-high TV tower was built in 1980, and the older one was converted into a hotel. The new TV tower also functions as a lookout point. Two ski pistes were built beside of the TV tower. Since 1990, the former trade union resort was demolished, and a parking lot was created in its place. The hotel operating in the old TV tower is also closed.

== Climate ==
Kékes Peak is the highest altitude region in Hungary, so it has the highest altitude weather station in the country. Although the mountain is still classified as a temperate humid continental climate (Dfb) according to the Köppen climate classification, it is very close to a subarctic climate (Dfc). Unlike cities in the plains such as Miskolc, which is also classified as a humid continental climate (Dfb), it is closer to an oceanic climate (Cfb) and may even be subtropical humid (Cfa). The annual average temperature of Kékes is 6.4 °C (43.5 °F), which is about 5 °C (9.0 °F) lower than that of Budapest or Miskolc. August is the warmest month with an average temperature of 16.4 °C (61.5 °F); January is the coldest month with −3.4 °C (25.9 °F). Temperature extremes ranged from −22.6 °C (−8.7 °F) in 1987 to 31.4 °C (88.5 °F) on July 20, 2007.

Climate data for Kékestető (1991−2020 normals, extremes 1973−present)
Month	Jan	Feb	Mar	Apr	May	Jun	Jul	Aug	Sep	Oct	Nov	Dec	Year
Record high °C (°F)	12.2 (54.0)	13.9 (57.0)	21.0 (69.8)	22.4 (72.3)	25.6 (78.1)	29.7 (85.5)	31.4 (88.5)	30.4 (86.7)	25.8 (78.4)	22.0 (71.6)	17.4 (63.3)	12.5 (54.5)	31.4 (88.5)
Mean daily maximum °C (°F)	−1.4 (29.5)	−0.2 (31.6)	3.4 (38.1)	10.1 (50.2)	14.6 (58.3)	18.0 (64.4)	20.0 (68.0)	19.9 (67.8)	14.5 (58.1)	9.3 (48.7)	4.0 (39.2)	−0.7 (30.7)	9.3 (48.7)
Daily mean °C (°F)	−3.4 (25.9)	−2.7 (27.1)	0.6 (33.1)	6.3 (43.3)	10.9 (51.6)	14.5 (58.1)	16.3 (61.3)	16.4 (61.5)	11.3 (52.3)	6.6 (43.9)	1.9 (35.4)	−2.5 (27.5)	6.4 (43.5)
Mean daily minimum °C (°F)	−5.3 (22.5)	−4.7 (23.5)	−1.8 (28.8)	3.7 (38.7)	8.0 (46.4)	11.5 (52.7)	13.4 (56.1)	13.9 (57.0)	9.1 (48.4)	4.6 (40.3)	0.1 (32.2)	−4.3 (24.3)	4.0 (39.2)
Record low °C (°F)	−22.6 (−8.7)	−19.8 (−3.6)	−19.4 (−2.9)	−9.7 (14.5)	−4.0 (24.8)	1.0 (33.8)	4.5 (40.1)	1.0 (33.8)	−3.0 (26.6)	−8.0 (17.6)	−13.0 (8.6)	−18.7 (−1.7)	−22.6 (−8.7)
Average precipitation mm (inches)	41.5 (1.63)	50.0 (1.97)	47.9 (1.89)	58.9 (2.32)	94.3 (3.71)	82.2 (3.24)	105.7 (4.16)	80.5 (3.17)	67.6 (2.66)	66.2 (2.61)	67.2 (2.65)	52.0 (2.05)	814.0 (32.05)
Average precipitation days (≥ 1.0 mm)	6.9	7.6	7.5	8.2	10.3	9.5	9.6	7.5	7.3	7.4	8.0	8.0	97.8
Average snowy days	10.8	10.8	8.6	5.4	0.6	0.0	0.0	0.0	0.2	1.7	6.9	10.8	55.9
Average relative humidity (%)	84.1	82.0	77.0	68.1	73.0	74.3	72.2	70.3	75.9	81.6	84.7	82.7	77.2
Mean monthly sunshine hours	89.8	100.1	144.2	174.7	221.0	238.9	268.0	237.9	189.4	166.7	97.4	77.4	2,005.4
Percentage possible sunshine	33	36	40	43	48	51	56	55	51	51	36	30	46
Source: NOAA (snow days and sunshine 1967−1994)

== Road cycling ==
For road bicycle racing enthusiasts, the mountain can be climbed by two main routes.

- South from Gyöngyös: 839 m over 17.8 km. This is the most famous and difficult ascent.
- North from Parád: 775 m over 16.9 km. About equal in difficulty as the ascent from Gyöngyös, but better sheltered against the sun and the wind.

=== Tour de Hongrie stage finishes ===
Kékes is the most difficult climb of the Tour de Hongrie professional road bicycle stage race. From 2001, a stage finish at the summit is usually part of the route each year the race is held.

Year	Stage	Start of stage	Distance (km)	Category	Stage winner	General leadership
2001	3	Tiszaújváros	174	1	(Serbia and Montenegro) Mikoš Rnjaković	(Serbia and Montenegro) Mikoš Rnjaković
2003	4	Miskolc	127.3	1	(Croatia) Matija Kvasina	(Slovakia) Zoltán Remák
2003	5	Mátraháza	3.4	ITT	(Hungary) Tamás Lengyel	(Slovakia) Zoltán Remák
2004	5	Mezőkövesd	148	1	(Ukraine) Anatoliy Varvaruk	(Slovakia) Zoltán Remák
2005	5	Mezőkövesd	93	1	(New Zealand) Glen Chadwick	(Hungary) Tamás Lengyel
2005	6	Mátraháza	3.4	ITT	(Hungary) Tamás Lengyel	(Hungary) Tamás Lengyel
2015	4	Karcag	146	1	(Slovenia) Andi Bajc	(Luxembourg) Tom Thill
2016	4	Karcag	144	1	(United States) Chris Butler	(Estonia) Mihkel Räim
2019	4	Karcag	138.1	1	(Latvia) Krists Neilands	(Latvia) Krists Neilands
2020	4	Miskolc	187.8	1	(Hungary) Attila Valter	(Hungary) Attila Valter
2021	4	Balassagyarmat	202.2	1	(Australia) Damien Howson	(Australia) Damien Howson
2022	5	Miskolc	183.7	1	(Italy) Antonio Tiberi	(Republic of Ireland) Edward Dunbar
2024	3	Kazincbarcika	182.7	1	(Belgium) Thibau Nys	(Belgium) Thibau Nys
2025	3	Gödöllő	162.8	1	(Ecuador) Harold Martín López	(Ecuador) Harold Martín López

== See also ==
- List of highest paved roads in Europe by country
