= Stekenjokk =

Coordinates: 65°06′N 14°28′E

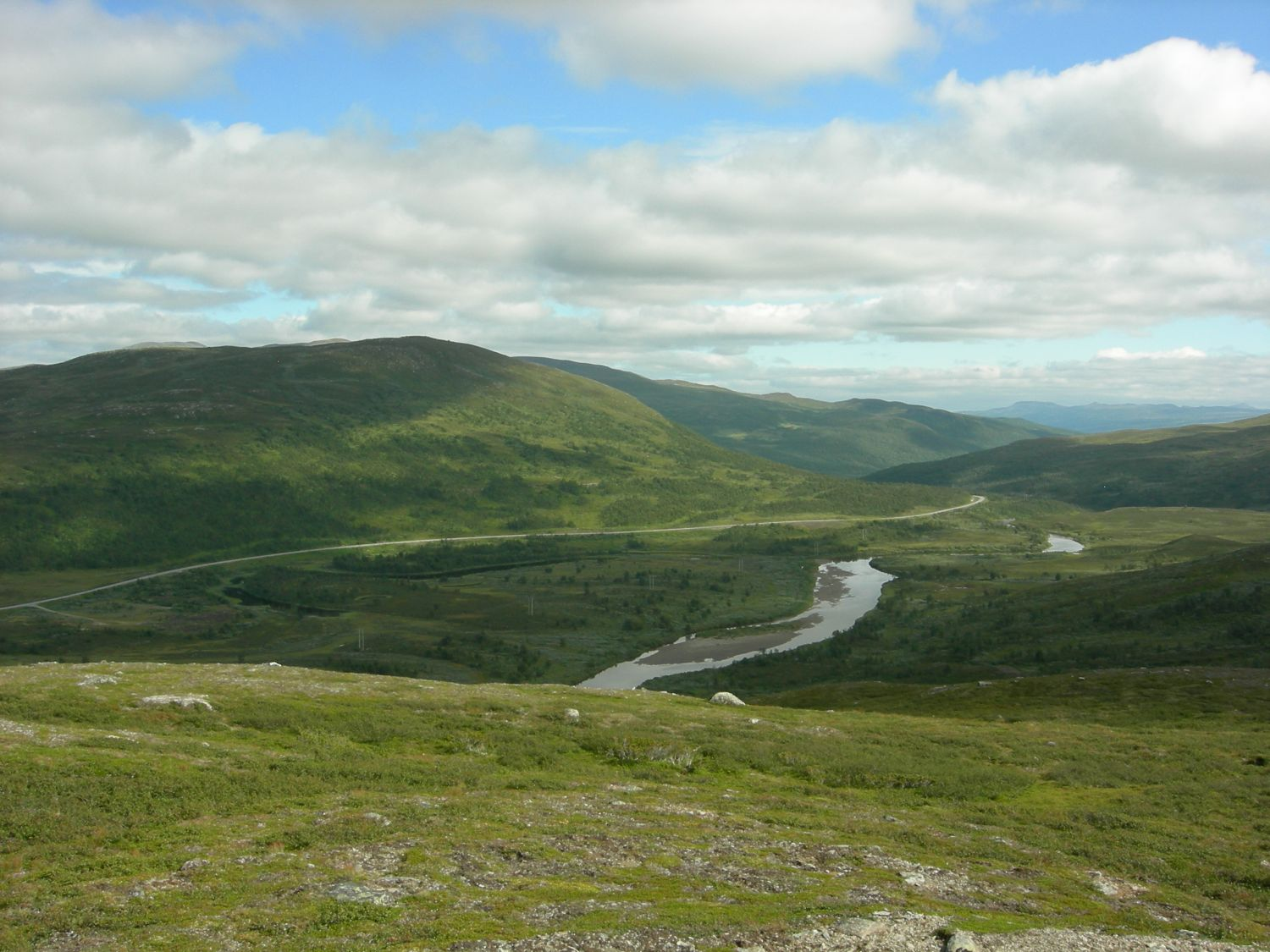
Vildmarksvägen between Stekenjokk and Klimpfjäll.

Stekenjokk is an area of Strömsund Municipality in Jämtlands län and Vilhelmina Municipality in Västerbotten, Sweden, a few miles from the border with Norway. The word "jokk" is Sami for watercourse. The Swedish Meteorological and Hydrological Institute (SMHI) has a weather station in the area. As of 2013 Stekenjokk holds the Swedish record for continuous wind speed, with 47 m/s (170 km/h or 110 mph) recorded during Cyclone Hilde in November 2013.

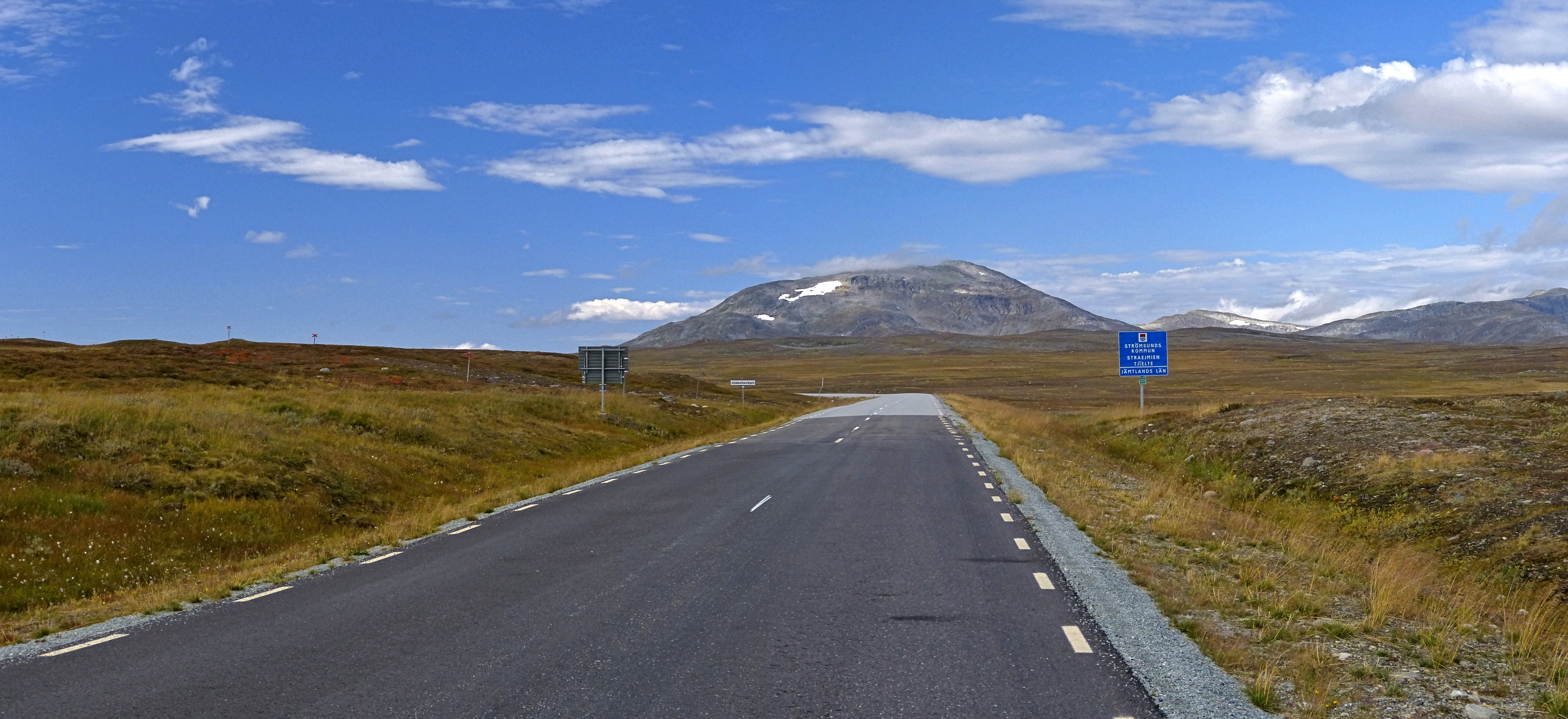
Vildmarksvägen

Between Blåsjön (English: the blue lake) and Stekenjokk runs one of Sweden's highest located roads, Vildmarksvägen. Stekenjokk is one of the Sami people's reindeer grazing areas during the summer, and the reindeer and the work around them is part of the nature experience when visiting the area. The Stekenjokk copper mine was located in this area until it was closed in 1989. A SMHI weather station located in the area recorded temperatures in 2007 that showed that Stekenjokk was the coldest place in Sweden. Stekenjokk also is close to Børgefjell National Park on the Norwegian side.

In 2012, for a few months the Stekenjokk area was closed for visitors because thieves stole birds' eggs from nests in Stekenjokk's nature reserve. The grounds remained closed to the public until the snowfall ended and the birds had the opportunity to lay new eggs. The grounds reopened for the public in late 2012.

In 2013, Vilhelmina Mineral AB submitted an application to open two new mineral mines in Stekenjokk. The Västerbotten council denied the application in November of that year stating that the new mines would disrupt and disturb the reindeer in the area. The Sami population in the area has stated that they would have to decrease the number of reindeer that they can take care of if the mines open in the future.

Nearby villages and locations include Klimpfjäll, Fatmomakke, Saxnäs, Ankarede, Stora Blåsjön and Gäddede. The municipal seat on the northern side of Vilhelmina is 130 kilometres (81 mi) to the east by road. The southern municipal seat of Strömsund is even further away at 180 kilometres (110 mi) travelling distance.

== Climate ==
Stekenjokk has a subarctic climate that is too cold to support the growing of trees. There is no precipitation reader at the weather station, but Gäddede relatively nearby and at lower elevation receives more precipitation than the Swedish national average. Due to Stekenjokk's consistently cold and long winters, this leads to a vast snow pack lingering into early summer.

Climate data for Stekenjokk A 1991-2020 (1037m)
Month	Jan	Feb	Mar	Apr	May	Jun	Jul	Aug	Sep	Oct	Nov	Dec	Year
Mean daily maximum °C (°F)	−6.8 (19.8)	−7.3 (18.9)	−5.4 (22.3)	−1.7 (28.9)	3.2 (37.8)	9.0 (48.2)	12.9 (55.2)	11.2 (52.2)	6.1 (43.0)	−0.1 (31.8)	−3.7 (25.3)	−5.6 (21.9)	1.0 (33.8)
Daily mean °C (°F)	−9.0 (15.8)	−9.6 (14.7)	−7.7 (18.1)	−4.0 (24.8)	0.6 (33.1)	5.6 (42.1)	9.3 (48.7)	8.0 (46.4)	3.6 (38.5)	−1.8 (28.8)	−5.6 (21.9)	−7.6 (18.3)	−1.5 (29.3)
Mean daily minimum °C (°F)	−11.1 (12.0)	−11.8 (10.8)	−10.0 (14.0)	−6.3 (20.7)	−2.0 (28.4)	2.5 (36.5)	6.3 (43.3)	5.6 (42.1)	1.7 (35.1)	−3.5 (25.7)	−7.5 (18.5)	−9.7 (14.5)	−3.8 (25.1)
Source: NOAA

Climate data for Stekenjokk (2002–2021 averages & extremes)
Month	Jan	Feb	Mar	Apr	May	Jun	Jul	Aug	Sep	Oct	Nov	Dec	Year
Record high °C (°F)	3.2 (37.8)	6.2 (43.2)	6.4 (43.5)	10.0 (50.0)	19.4 (66.9)	24.9 (76.8)	25.4 (77.7)	21.4 (70.5)	17.2 (63.0)	12.2 (54.0)	9.2 (48.6)	4.5 (40.1)	25.4 (77.7)
Mean maximum °C (°F)	−0.5 (31.1)	0.3 (32.5)	0.5 (32.9)	4.9 (40.8)	12.6 (54.7)	17.7 (63.9)	20.5 (68.9)	18.4 (65.1)	13.2 (55.8)	6.5 (43.7)	2.2 (36.0)	0.4 (32.7)	21.5 (70.7)
Mean daily maximum °C (°F)	−7.1 (19.2)	−6.9 (19.6)	−5.1 (22.8)	−1.1 (30.0)	3.8 (38.8)	9.6 (49.3)	13.7 (56.7)	11.5 (52.7)	6.2 (43.2)	0.1 (32.2)	−3.3 (26.1)	−5.5 (22.1)	1.3 (34.4)
Daily mean °C (°F)	−9.3 (15.3)	−9.2 (15.4)	−7.5 (18.5)	−3.4 (25.9)	1.2 (34.2)	6.3 (43.3)	10.4 (50.7)	8.7 (47.7)	4.0 (39.2)	−1.6 (29.1)	−5.2 (22.6)	−7.5 (18.5)	−1.1 (30.0)
Mean daily minimum °C (°F)	−11.4 (11.5)	−11.5 (11.3)	−9.8 (14.4)	−5.7 (21.7)	−1.5 (29.3)	3.0 (37.4)	7.1 (44.8)	5.9 (42.6)	1.8 (35.2)	−3.3 (26.1)	−7.0 (19.4)	−9.5 (14.9)	−3.5 (25.7)
Mean minimum °C (°F)	−19.7 (−3.5)	−19.7 (−3.5)	−16.5 (2.3)	−11.8 (10.8)	−7.9 (17.8)	−3.1 (26.4)	0.9 (33.6)	0.4 (32.7)	−3.3 (26.1)	−9.7 (14.5)	−14.6 (5.7)	−16.6 (2.1)	−22.6 (−8.7)
Record low °C (°F)	−26.8 (−16.2)	−27.4 (−17.3)	−22.6 (−8.7)	−15.4 (4.3)	−11.8 (10.8)	−7.0 (19.4)	−1.8 (28.8)	−3.3 (26.1)	−6.8 (19.8)	−13.8 (7.2)	−19.2 (−2.6)	−24.9 (−12.8)	−27.4 (−17.3)
Source: SMHI Open Data for Stekenjokk - Temperature
