= Sara Larsson (politician) =

Swedish politician (born 1977)

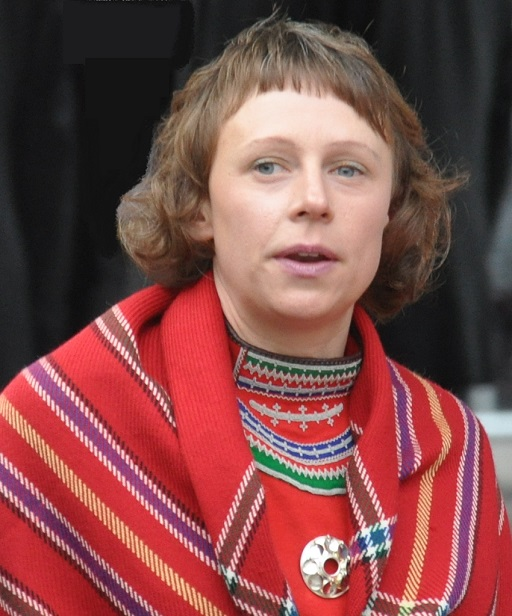

Member of the Sámi Parliament of Sweden
- In office 2005–2017

Personal details
- Born: 4 January 1977 (age 49) Malmö, Sweden
- Education: Luleå University of Technology

Sara Johanna Maria Larsson (born 4 January 1977) is a Swedish Sámi politician. She was a member of the Sámi Parliament of Sweden (Sametinget) from 2005 to 2017 and chaired the parliamentary board twice in rotation.

== Early life and education ==
Larsson grew up as the child of a reindeer herder family in Klimhpe (Southern Sámi for Klimpfjäll) in the Vilhelmina södra sameby. Larsson was trained as a human ecologist at Luleå University of Technology (LTU) and worked in the administration of Västerbotten County.

== Political career ==
Larsson has been politically active since 2001 and became a member of parliament and chairman of the Min Geaidnu party (MG) in 2005. In 2013 she was elected deputy chairman. In 2009, she won one of the three seats for Min Geaidnu. In the Sámi Parliament of Sweden, the Sámediggi in Kiruna, Larsson was chairwoman of the five-member parliamentary board (Swedish: styrelseordförande) from 2009 to May 2010 and from May to November 2011. She received a second mandate for the years 2013 to 2017. In the 2017 election, her party only received a single mandate. Christina Åhrén became MP, and Larsson came in fourth place for her party.

As chairwoman of the Swedish parliamentary board, Larsson was president of the Sámi Parliamentary Council (Sámi Parlamentáralaš Rađđi, Samisk parliamentariskt råd, SPR) until 15 April 2010.

== Personal life ==
Larsson is married and the mother of three children; she has a sister.
