= Harthope Moss =

- Location within County Durham
- Elevation: 627 metres (2,057 ft)
- Traversed by: C road

Third Approach
- Location: St John's Chapel, County Durham, & Langdon Beck, Upper Teesdale, County Durham, England
- Coordinates: 54°42′33″N 2°12′57″W

Harthope Moss, also known as Chapel Fell (elevation 627 m; 2,057 ft) is a mountain pass in the English Pennines. The pass divides Weardale to the north and Teesdale to the south. The unclassified road over the pass connects the A689 at St John's Chapel, County Durham with the B6277 near Langdon Beck in Upper Teesdale, County Durham. It is the equal highest paved pass in England with the Killhope Cross on the A689, approximately 10 miles to the north on the other side of Burnhope Seat (747 m; 2,451 ft).

== See also ==
- List of highest paved roads in Europe
- List of mountain passes
