= Mátraháza =

Coordinates: 47°52′N 19°59′E

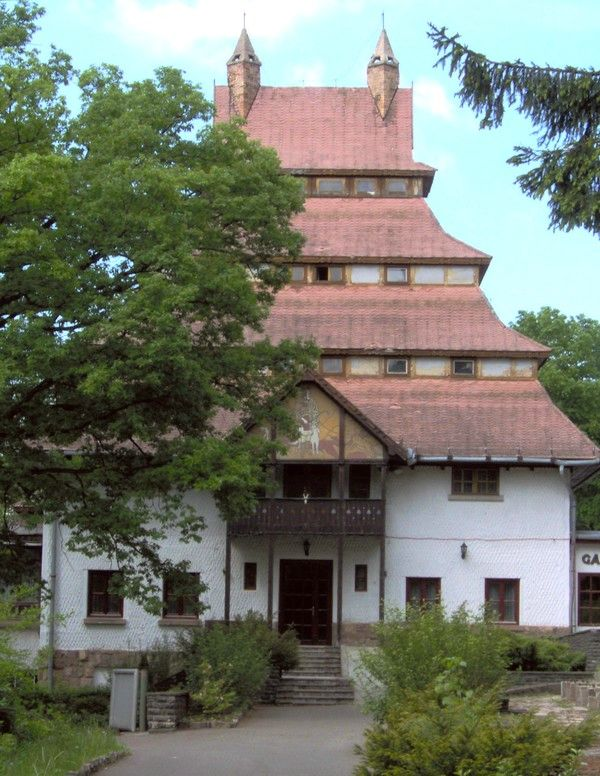
The "Pagoda" building in Mátraháza

Mátraháza is resort place of the town of Gyöngyös in Heves county, Hungary, in the Mátra mountain range. The territory of Mátraháza have an own postal code: 3233. It is 14.4 km away from the town center. The highest peak of Hungary, the Kékes is 3.7 km away from the resort place. As of 2022 census, it has a population of 80.

== History ==
As the first step in the development of the resort, the Mátra Association created a marked trail in the Kalló valley in 1888, at the end of which Pál Klimó created a forest rest area. The construction of the road connecting Gyöngyös with Parád in 1907 was completed and the workers' house was bought by the Mátra Association led by Kolos Hanák and turned into a hostel. The Mátra Association built the Kékesalja Hostel between 1927 and 1930. The lung sanatorium and the road leading to Kékes were completed in 1932. A ski slope was created from Kékes to the Kékesalja Hostel. The military resort was built in 1933. The Patrona Hungariae chapel was built in 1942, and its wooden relief door was created in 1999 by the sculptor István Hegedűs. The Kékesalja hostel became a trade union resort in 1949 and was renamed the Sports Hotel. The Vörösmarty hostel was built in 1958, named after the poet Mihály Vörösmarty, the first known tourist of Mátra, who wrote a travel report in 1829 about his hike. The Hanák Kolos hostel was demolished in 1960 and a sports field and a training camp were built in its place. In 1960 created a ski jumping hill too. The jump record was 83.5 m. However, the facility became unusable by 1980. After 1990 the Sports Hotel closed, then reopened as Hotel Pagoda, but later closed again. The Vörösmarty hostel and the bus station is the stamping places of the National Blue Trail.

== See also ==
- List of highest paved roads in Europe by country
