= 2020 Tour de Hongrie =

2020 UCI Europe Tour

Race details
- Dates: 29 August – 2 September 2020
- Stages: 5
- Distance: 826 km (513.3 mi)
- Winning time: 18h 45' 55"

Results
Jersey awarded to the overall winner	Winner	Attila Valter (HUN)	(CCC Team)
	Second	Quinn Simmons (USA)	(Trek–Segafredo)
	Third	Damien Howson (AUS)	(Mitchelton–Scott)
Jersey awarded to the points classification winner	Points	Jakub Mareczko (ITA)	(CCC Team)
Jersey awarded to the mountains classification winner	Mountains	Attila Valter (HUN)	(CCC Team)
	Team	Team Jumbo–Visma	

The 2020 Tour de Hongrie was the 41st edition of the Tour de Hongrie. It was originally scheduled to take place between 13 and 17 May 2020, but was postponed to between 29 August and 2 September 2020 due to the COVID-19 pandemic. It was the sixth edition of the race since its revival in 2015, and was rated as a 2.1 event as part of the 2020 UCI Europe Tour.

== Teams ==
Twenty teams, consisting of five UCI WorldTeams, eight UCI ProTeams, six UCI Continental teams, and the Hungarian national team, participated in the race. Each team entered six riders, except for Giotti Victoria, which entered five. 100 of the 119 riders that started the race finished.

UCI WorldTeams

- CCC Team
- Israel Start-Up Nation
- Mitchelton–Scott
- Team Jumbo–Visma
- Trek–Segafredo

UCI ProTeams

- Alpecin–Fenix
- Androni Giocattoli–Sidermec
- Bingoal–Wallonie Bruxelles
- Caja Rural–Seguros RGA
- Sport Vlaanderen–Baloise
- Team Novo Nordisk
- Uno-X Pro Cycling Team
- Vini Zabù–KTM

UCI Continental Teams

- Adria Mobil
- Elkov–Kasper
- Giotti Victoria
- Kometa Xstra Cycling Team
- Team Novak
- Team Vorarlberg Santic

National Teams

- Hungary

== Route ==
Stage characteristics and winners
Stage	Date	Route	Distance	Type	Winner
1	29 August	Esztergom to Esztergom	118 km (73 mi)	Hilly stage	Jon Aberasturi (ESP)
2	30 August	Debrecen to Hajdúszoboszló	158 km (98 mi)	Flat stage	Jakub Mareczko (ITA)
3	31 August	Karcag to Nyíregyháza	182 km (113 mi)	Flat stage	Jakub Mareczko (ITA)
4	1 September	Sárospatak to Kazincbarcika	180 km (110 mi)	Flat stage	Jakub Mareczko (ITA)
5	2 September	Miskolc to Gyöngyös (Kékestető)	188 km (117 mi)	Intermediate stage	Attila Valter (HUN)
	Total		826 km (513 mi)		

== Stages ==
=== Stage 1 ===
29 August 2020 — Esztergom to Esztergom, 118 km (73 mi)

Stage 1 Result
Rank	Rider	Team	Time
1	Jon Aberasturi (ESP)	Caja Rural–Seguros RGA	2h 48' 04"
2	Kaden Groves (AUS)	Mitchelton–Scott	+ 0"
3	Adam Ťoupalík (CZE)	Elkov–Kasper	+ 0"
4	Kamil Gradek (POL)	CCC Team	+ 0"
5	David van der Poel (NED)	Alpecin–Fenix	+ 0"
6	Itamar Einhorn (ISR)	Israel Start-Up Nation	+ 0"
7	Diego Pablo Sevilla (ESP)	Kometa Xstra Cycling Team	+ 0"
8	Aksel Nõmmela (EST)	Bingoal–Wallonie Bruxelles	+ 0"
9	Riccardo Stacchiotti (ITA)	Vini Zabù–KTM	+ 0"
10	Markus Hoelgaard (NOR)	Uno-X Pro Cycling Team	+ 0"

General classification after Stage 1
Rank	Rider	Team	Time
1	Jon Aberasturi (ESP)	Caja Rural–Seguros RGA	2h 47' 54"
2	Kaden Groves (AUS)	Mitchelton–Scott	+ 4"
3	Adam Ťoupalík (CZE)	Elkov–Kasper	+ 6"
4	Kamil Gradek (POL)	CCC Team	+ 10"
5	David van der Poel (NED)	Alpecin–Fenix	+ 10"
6	Itamar Einhorn (ISR)	Israel Start-Up Nation	+ 10"
7	Diego Pablo Sevilla (ESP)	Kometa Xstra Cycling Team	+ 10"
8	Aksel Nõmmela (EST)	Bingoal–Wallonie Bruxelles	+ 10"
9	Riccardo Stacchiotti (ITA)	Vini Zabù–KTM	+ 10"
10	Markus Hoelgaard (NOR)	Uno-X Pro Cycling Team	+ 10"

=== Stage 2 ===
30 August 2020 — Debrecen to Hajdúszoboszló, 158 km (98 mi)

Stage 2 Result
Rank	Rider	Team	Time
1	Jakub Mareczko (ITA)	CCC Team	3h 38' 20"
2	Matteo Moschetti (ITA)	Trek–Segafredo	+ 0"
3	Luca Pacioni (ITA)	Androni Giocattoli–Sidermec	+ 0"
4	Andrea Guardini (ITA)	Giotti Victoria	+ 0"
5	Itamar Einhorn (ISR)	Israel Start-Up Nation	+ 0"
6	Alexander Konychev (ITA)	Mitchelton–Scott	+ 0"
7	Alois Kaňkovský (CZE)	Elkov–Kasper	+ 0"
8	Emīls Liepiņš (LAT)	Trek–Segafredo	+ 0"
9	Rudy Barbier (FRA)	Israel Start-Up Nation	+ 0"
10	Erlend Blikra (NOR)	Uno-X Pro Cycling Team	+ 0"

General classification after Stage 2
Rank	Rider	Team	Time
1	Jon Aberasturi (ESP)	Caja Rural–Seguros RGA	6h 26' 14"
2	Kaden Groves (AUS)	Mitchelton–Scott	+ 4"
3	András Szatmáry (HUN)	Hungary	+ 5"
4	Gilles De Wilde (BEL)	Sport Vlaanderen–Baloise	+ 5"
5	Adam Ťoupalík (CZE)	Elkov–Kasper	+ 6"
6	David Lozano (ESP)	Team Novo Nordisk	+ 9"
7	Arturo Gravalos (ESP)	Kometa Xstra Cycling Team	+ 9"
8	Žiga Horvat (SLO)	Adria Mobil	+ 9"
9	Itamar Einhorn (ISR)	Israel Start-Up Nation	+ 10"
10	David van der Poel (NED)	Alpecin–Fenix	+ 10"

=== Stage 3 ===
31 August 2020 — Karcag to Nyíregyháza, 182 km (113 mi)

Stage 3 Result
Rank	Rider	Team	Time
1	Jakub Mareczko (ITA)	CCC Team	3h 48' 33"
2	Kaden Groves (AUS)	Mitchelton–Scott	+ 0"
3	Erlend Blikra (NOR)	Uno-X Pro Cycling Team	+ 0"
4	Matteo Moschetti (ITA)	Trek–Segafredo	+ 0"
5	David van der Poel (NED)	Alpecin–Fenix	+ 0"
6	Itamar Einhorn (ISR)	Israel Start-Up Nation	+ 0"
7	Andrea Guardini (ITA)	Giotti Victoria	+ 0"
8	Rudy Barbier (FRA)	Israel Start-Up Nation	+ 0"
9	Luca Pacioni (ITA)	Androni Giocattoli–Sidermec	+ 0"
10	Emīls Liepiņš (LAT)	Trek–Segafredo	+ 0"

General classification after Stage 3
Rank	Rider	Team	Time
1	Kaden Groves (AUS)	Mitchelton–Scott	10h 14' 45"
2	Jon Aberasturi (ESP)	Caja Rural–Seguros RGA	+ 2"
3	Lennard Hofstede (NED)	Team Jumbo–Visma	+ 3"
4	Emiel Planckaert (BEL)	Sport Vlaanderen–Baloise	+ 6"
5	Gilles De Wilde (BEL)	Sport Vlaanderen–Baloise	+ 7"
6	András Szatmáry (HUN)	Hungary	+ 7"
7	Adam Ťoupalík (CZE)	Elkov–Kasper	+ 8"
8	Kristian Kulset (NOR)	Uno-X Pro Cycling Team	+ 9"
9	David Lozano (ESP)	Team Novo Nordisk	+ 11"
10	Arturo Gravalos (ESP)	Kometa Xstra Cycling Team	+ 11"

=== Stage 4 ===
1 September 2020 — Sárospatak to Kazincbarcika, 180 km (110 mi)

Stage 4 Result
Rank	Rider	Team	Time
1	Jakub Mareczko (ITA)	CCC Team	3h 55' 53"
2	Emīls Liepiņš (LAT)	Trek–Segafredo	+ 0"
3	David van der Poel (NED)	Alpecin–Fenix	+ 0"
4	Sasha Weemaes (BEL)	Sport Vlaanderen–Baloise	+ 0"
5	Andrea Guardini (ITA)	Giotti Victoria	+ 0"
6	Jon Aberasturi (ESP)	Caja Rural–Seguros RGA	+ 0"
7	Luca Pacioni (ITA)	Androni Giocattoli–Sidermec	+ 0"
8	Julien Mortier (BEL)	Bingoal–Wallonie Bruxelles	+ 0"
9	Alexander Konychev (ITA)	Mitchelton–Scott	+ 0"
10	Ádám Kristóf Karl (HUN)	Hungary	+ 0"

General classification after Stage 4
Rank	Rider	Team	Time
1	Kaden Groves (AUS)	Mitchelton–Scott	14h 10' 38"
2	Jon Aberasturi (ESP)	Caja Rural–Seguros RGA	+ 2"
3	Lennard Hofstede (NED)	Team Jumbo–Visma	+ 3"
4	Emiel Planckaert (BEL)	Sport Vlaanderen–Baloise	+ 6"
5	David van der Poel (NED)	Alpecin–Fenix	+ 7"
6	András Szatmáry (HUN)	Hungary	+ 7"
7	Gilles De Wilde (BEL)	Sport Vlaanderen–Baloise	+ 7"
8	Diego Pablo Sevilla (ESP)	Kometa Xstra Cycling Team	+ 7"
9	Adam Ťoupalík (CZE)	Elkov–Kasper	+ 8"
10	Itamar Einhorn (ISR)	Israel Start-Up Nation	+ 9"

=== Stage 5 ===
2 September 2020 — Miskolc to Gyöngyös (Kékestető), 188 km (117 mi)

Stage 5 Result
Rank	Rider	Team	Time
1	Attila Valter (HUN)	CCC Team	4h 35' 15"
2	Quinn Simmons (USA)	Trek–Segafredo	+ 10"
3	Damien Howson (AUS)	Mitchelton–Scott	+ 12"
4	Matteo Badilatti (SUI)	Israel Start-Up Nation	+ 15"
5	Tobias Foss (NOR)	Team Jumbo–Visma	+ 17"
6	Janez Brajkovič (SLO)	Adria Mobil	+ 17"
7	Laurens Huys (BEL)	Bingoal–Wallonie Bruxelles	+ 20"
8	Alexis Guérin (FRA)	Team Vorarlberg Santic	+ 21"
9	Cristián Rodríguez (ESP)	Caja Rural–Seguros RGA	+ 27"
10	James Piccoli (CAN)	Israel Start-Up Nation	+ 37"

General classification after Stage 5
Rank	Rider	Team	Time
1	Attila Valter (HUN)	CCC Team	18h 45' 55"
2	Quinn Simmons (USA)	Trek–Segafredo	+ 12"
3	Damien Howson (AUS)	Mitchelton–Scott	+ 16"
4	Matteo Badilatti (SUI)	Israel Start-Up Nation	+ 25"
5	Tobias Foss (NOR)	Team Jumbo–Visma	+ 26"
6	Janez Brajkovič (SLO)	Adria Mobil	+ 27"
7	Alexis Guérin (FRA)	Team Vorarlberg Santic	+ 30"
8	Laurens Huys (BEL)	Bingoal–Wallonie Bruxelles	+ 30"
9	Cristián Rodríguez (ESP)	Caja Rural–Seguros RGA	+ 37"
10	James Piccoli (CAN)	Israel Start-Up Nation	+ 47"

== Classification leadership table ==
In the 2020 Tour de Hongrie, four jerseys were awarded. The general classification was calculated by adding each cyclist's finishing times on each stage. The leader of the general classification received a yellow jersey, sponsored by the Hungarian Tourism Agency (Aktív Magyarország), and the winner of this classification is considered the winner of the race.

Points for the points classification
Type	1	2	3	4	5	6	7	8	9	10	11	12	13	14	15
Stage finishes	30	26	24	22	20	18	16	14	12	10	8	6	4	2	1
Intermediate sprint	3	2	1	0											

The second classification was the points classification. Riders were awarded points for finishing in the top fifteen in a stage. Points were also on offer at intermediate sprints. The leader of the points classification wore a green jersey, sponsored by Škoda and Europcar.

Points for the mountains classification
Type	1	2	3	4	5	6	7
Points for Category	15	12	9	6	4	2	1
Points for Category	6	4	2	0			
Points for Category	3	2	1	0			

There was also a mountains classification for which points were awarded for reaching the top of a climb before other riders. The climbs were categorized, in order of increasing difficulty, as third, second and first-category. The leader of the mountains classification wore a red jersey, sponsored by Cofidis.

The fourth jersey was a classification for Hungarian riders, marked by a white jersey sponsored by the Hungarian Public Road Company (Magyar Közút) and the Hungarian Cycling Federation (Bringasport). Only Hungarian riders were eligible and they were ranked according to their placement in the general classification of the race.

The final classification was the team classification, for which the times of the best three cyclists in each team on each stage was added together; the leading team at the end of the race was the team with the lowest cumulative time.

Classification leadership by stage
Stage	Winner	General classification	Points classification	Mountains classification	Hungarian rider classification	Team classification
1	Jon Aberasturi	Jon Aberasturi	Jon Aberasturi	David Lozano	Márton Dina	CCC Team
2	Jakub Mareczko	Jon Aberasturi	Itamar Einhorn	David Lozano	András Szatmáry	CCC Team
3	Jakub Mareczko	Kaden Groves	Jakub Mareczko	David Lozano	András Szatmáry	CCC Team
4	Jakub Mareczko	Kaden Groves	Jakub Mareczko	David Lozano	András Szatmáry	CCC Team
5	Attila Valter	Attila Valter	Jakub Mareczko	Attila Valter	Attila Valter	Team Jumbo–Visma
Final		Attila Valter	Jakub Mareczko	Attila Valter	Attila Valter	Team Jumbo–Visma

== Final classification standings ==
Legend
Yellow jersey	Denotes the winner of the general classification	Green jersey	Denotes the winner of the points classification
Red jersey	Denotes the winner of the mountains classification	White jersey	Denotes the winner of the Hungarian rider classification

=== General classification ===
Final general classification (1–10)
Rank	Rider	Team	Time
1	Attila Valter (HUN)	CCC Team	18h 45' 55"
2	Quinn Simmons (USA)	Trek–Segafredo	+ 12"
3	Damien Howson (AUS)	Mitchelton–Scott	+ 16"
4	Matteo Badilatti (SUI)	Israel Start-Up Nation	+ 25"
5	Tobias Foss (NOR)	Team Jumbo–Visma	+ 26"
6	Janez Brajkovič (SLO)	Adria Mobil	+ 27"
7	Alexis Guérin (FRA)	Team Vorarlberg Santic	+ 30"
8	Laurens Huys (BEL)	Bingoal–Wallonie Bruxelles	+ 30"
9	Cristián Rodríguez (ESP)	Caja Rural–Seguros RGA	+ 37"
10	James Piccoli (CAN)	Israel Start-Up Nation	+ 47"

=== Points classification ===
Final points classification (1–10)
Rank	Rider	Team	Points
1	Jakub Mareczko (ITA)	CCC Team	90
2	David van der Poel (NED)	Alpecin–Fenix	73
3	Itamar Einhorn (ISR)	Israel Start-Up Nation	59
4	Andrea Guardini (ITA)	Giotti Victoria	58
5	Kaden Groves (AUS)	Mitchelton–Scott	53
6	Luca Pacioni (ITA)	Androni Giocattoli–Sidermec	52
7	Emīls Liepiņš (LAT)	Trek–Segafredo	50
8	Sasha Weemaes (BEL)	Sport Vlaanderen–Baloise	36
9	Erlend Blikra (NOR)	Uno-X Pro Cycling Team	34
10	Adam Ťoupalík (CZE)	Elkov–Kasper	32

=== Mountains classification ===
Final mountains classification (1–10)
Rank	Rider	Team	Points
1	Attila Valter (HUN)	CCC Team	21
2	David Lozano (ESP)	Team Novo Nordisk	21
3	Roland Thalmann (SUI)	Team Vorarlberg Santic	18
4	Koen Bouwman (NED)	Team Jumbo–Visma	15
5	Quinn Simmons (USA)	Trek–Segafredo	13
6	Damien Howson (AUS)	Mitchelton–Scott	11
7	Laurens Huys (BEL)	Bingoal–Wallonie Bruxelles	10
8	Lukas Meiler (GER)	Team Vorarlberg Santic	8
9	Veljko Stojnić (SRB)	Vini Zabù–KTM	6
10	Matteo Badilatti (SUI)	Israel Start-Up Nation	6

=== Hungarian rider classification ===
Final Hungarian rider classification (1–10)
Rank	Rider	Team	Time
1	Attila Valter (HUN)	CCC Team	18h 45' 55"
2	Márton Dina (HUN)	Kometa Xstra Cycling Team	+ 1' 51"
3	Péter Kusztor (HUN)	Team Novo Nordisk	+ 3' 22"
4	Viktor Filutás (HUN)	Giotti Victoria	+ 4' 05"
5	András Szatmáry (HUN)	Hungary	+ 6' 25"
6	Zsombor Palumby (HUN)	Hungary	+ 15' 31"
7	Ádám Kristóf Karl (HUN)	Hungary	+ 20' 56"
8	Gergő Orosz (HUN)	Hungary	+ 23' 08"
9	János Pelikán (HUN)	Androni Giocattoli–Sidermec	+ 23' 09"
10	András Szentpéteri (HUN)	Team Novak	+ 23' 10"

=== Teams classification ===
Final teams classification (1–10)
Rank	Team	Time
1	Team Jumbo–Visma	56h 20' 24"
2	Israel Start-Up Nation	+ 45"
3	Mitchelton–Scott	+ 1' 46"
4	Elkov–Kasper	+ 2' 46"
5	Kometa Xstra Cycling Team	+ 2' 51"
6	Uno-X Pro Cycling Team	+ 4' 28"
7	Adria Mobil	+ 5' 07"
8	Vini Zabù–KTM	+ 6' 42"
9	Team Vorarlberg Santic	+ 7' 27"
10	CCC Team	+ 7' 46"

== See also ==
- 2020 in men's road cycling
- 2020 in sports
