= Upper Weardale Town Hall =

Municipal building in St John's Chapel, County Durham, England

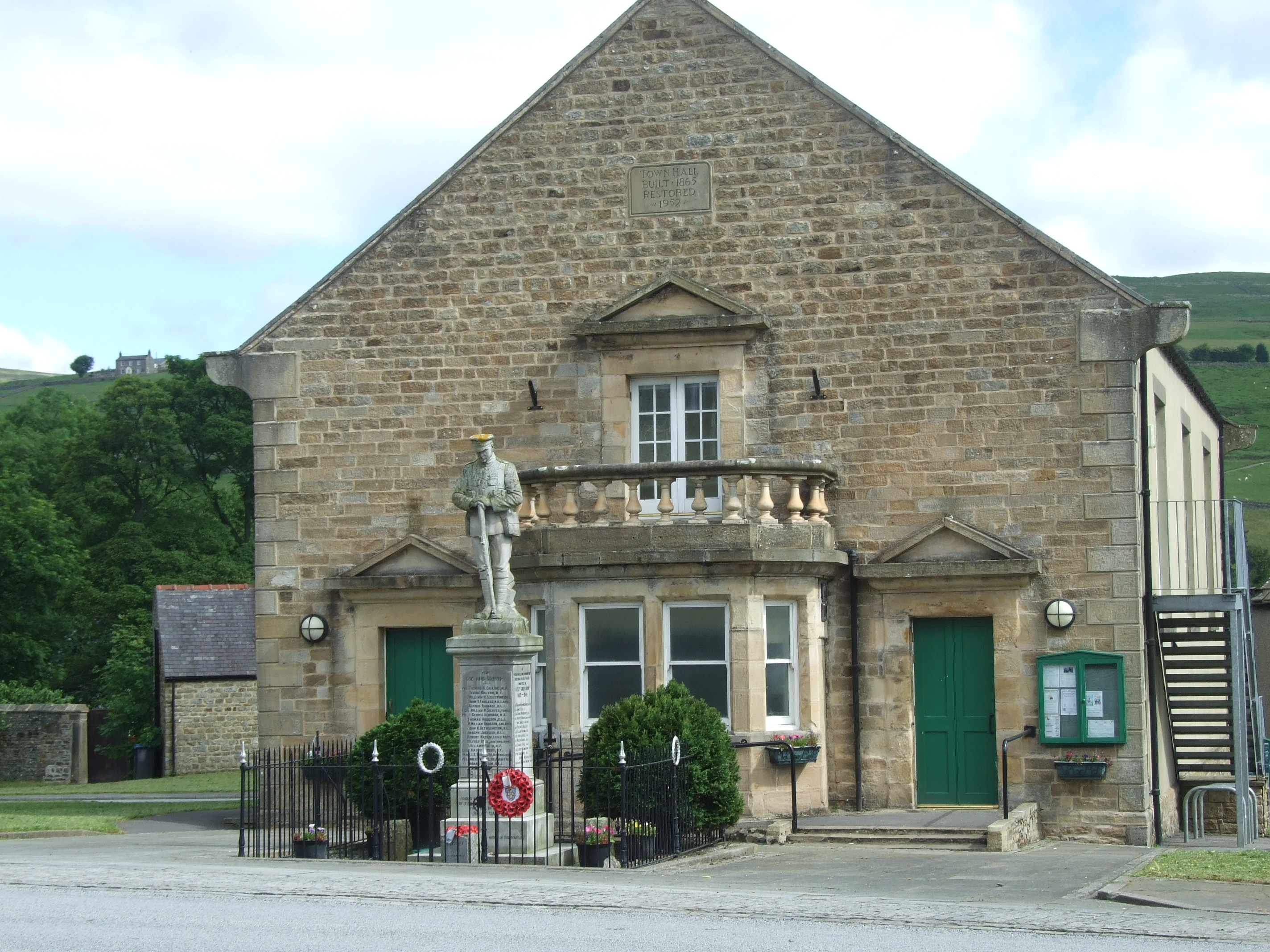
- The building in 2014

- Shown in County Durham
- 54.7366°N 2.1802°W
- Location: Hood Street, St John's Chapel

History
- Built: 1868

Site notes
- Architectural style: Neoclassical style

Upper Weardale Town Hall, also known as St John's Chapel Town Hall, is a municipal building on Hood Street, St John's Chapel, a village in County Durham, England. The building is currently in use as a community events venue.

== History ==
In the early 1860s, parish leaders decided to establish a town hall in the village, primarily to accommodate the weekly market. The site chosen had been the village green.

Construction work on the building began in 1865. It was designed in the neoclassical style, built in ashlar stone and was completed in 1868. The design involved a symmetrical main frontage of three bays facing onto Hood Street with a gable above. The central bay contained a canted bay window supporting a balustraded balcony; there was French door with an architrave and a triangular pediment on the first floor. The outer bays contained doorways with architraves and triangular pediments. Internally, the principal room was the assembly hall which was intended to accommodate concerts and theatre performances.

In the 1880s, a plaque, which has since been lost, was attached to the building, commemorating a dispute in the local leadmining industry. It read:

"Erected by the Weardale Leadminers in commemoration of their struggle for existence in their native dale in the years 1881–1883 and for parochial and political freedom, and especially to record their feelings of deepest gratitude, their recognition of the efforts made on their behalf to revive, foster and preserve the chief industry – lead mining – from becoming a thing of the past by their fearless and notable friend, Walter Beaumont, Esq., who through the guidance of Divine Providence, was instrumental in bringing it to a successful issue. The truth shall make you free."

A war memorial, in the form of a statue of a soldier with a down-turned rifle standing on a pedestal, which was intended to commemorate the lives of local service personnel who had died in the First World War, was designed by Beattie & Company of Carlisle and unveiled in front of the town hall by Colonel John Clay on 15 April 1922. Weekly markets, which had already been in decline, were terminated completed by 1925.

The war memorial was updated, at the end of Second World War, to commemorate the lives of local service personnel who had died in that war, including seven airmen who died when a Vickers Wellington crashed nearby on 7 May 1943. After being badly damaged in a fire in 1951, the building was restored in 1952. A stone panel was installed in the gable with the inscription "Town Hall built 1865; restored 1952 ". The building was subsequently used as a community centre, with a function room and a gym. In November 2021, it accommodated a welfare centre for people affected by the extratropical cyclone, Storm Arwen.
