= Kékestető TV Tower =

Tower on Kékes mountain, Hungary

- Kékes TV-torony
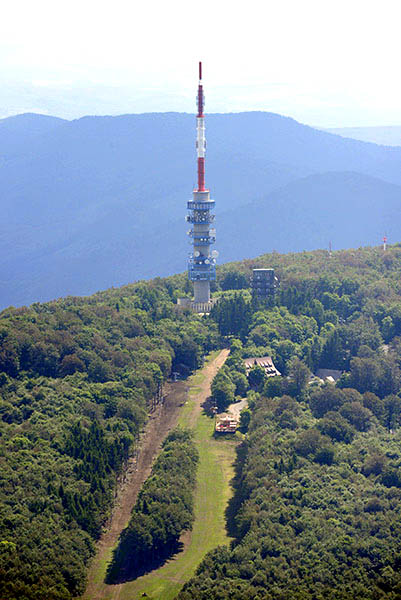
- Interactive map of the Kékestető TV Tower area

General information
- Status: In use
- Type: TV tower
- Location: Gyöngyös, Heves County, Hungary
- Coordinates: 47°52′22″N 20°0′33″E
- Construction started: 1978
- Completed: 1981

Height
- Height: 178 m

Design and construction
- Civil engineer: Út- és Vasúttervező Vállalat (Uvaterv, "Road and Railway Planner Company")
- Main contractor: Magyar Posta

Kékestető TV Tower (Hungarian: Kékes TV-torony) is a 176-metre (577 ft) tall multifunctional transmitter built of reinforced concrete on the 1,014-metre (3,327 ft) high Kékes mountain, Hungary. It is also an observation tower, including a restaurant.

== History ==
The Hungarian Carpathian Association built a 20 m high wooden watchtower at east of the Kékes summit in 1889, what was rebuilt and named after József Vass in 1926, but demolished in 1938. The first 65-meter TV tower, made of andesite, was handed over in 1960. A new 178-meter-high TV tower was built in 1980, and the older one was converted into a hotel (later closed). The new TV tower also functions as a lookout point.

== Transmitted channels ==
Radio	FM Frequency	ERP
Bartók Rádió	90.7 MHz	30 kW
Kossuth Rádió	95.5 MHz	20 kW
Dankó Rádió	99.8 MHz	0.32 kW
Petőfi Rádió	102.7 MHz	30 kW
Retro Rádió	104.7 MHz	30.2 kW
Television	Channel	ERP
Multiplex E (DVB-T2)	E34	72.4 kW
Multiplex B (DVB-T)	E36	74.1 kW
Multiplex A (DVB-T)	E39	77.6 kW
Multiplex C (DVB-T2)	E44	83.2 kW
Multiplex D (DVB-T2)	E46	83.2 kW
