= Mangart road =

Road in Slovenia

- Elevation: 2,055 m (6,742 ft)
- Traversed by: Road

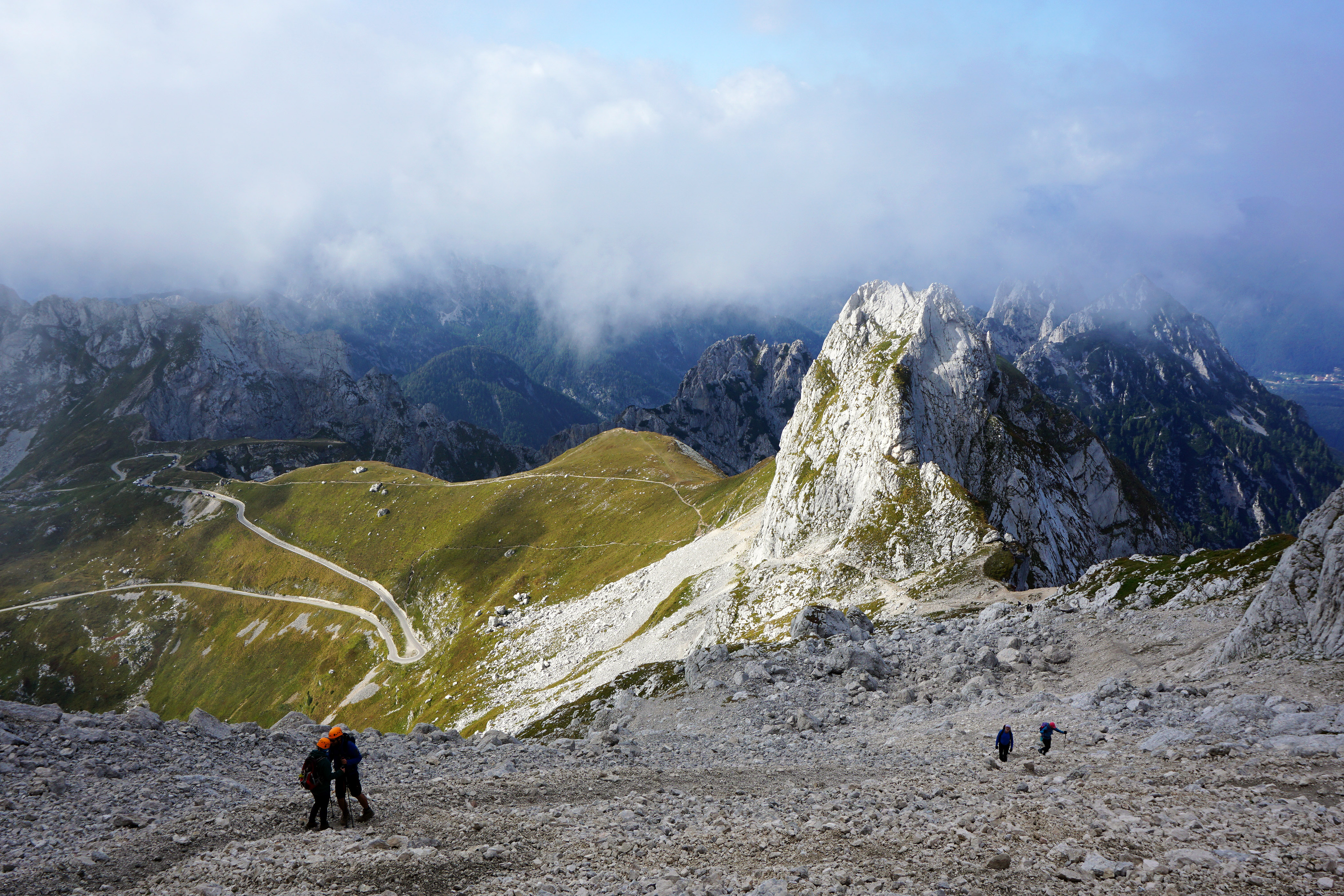
Mangart road and the Mangart pass.

The Mangart road, (Slovene: Mangartska cesta), at 2,055 m, is the highest road in Slovenia. It is the access road from Log pod Mangartom to the Mangart pass at Mangart. It was built in late 1930s.

== See also ==
- List of highest paved roads in Europe
- List of highest paved roads in Europe by country
- List of mountain passes
