= Biokovo Road =

Road in Croatia

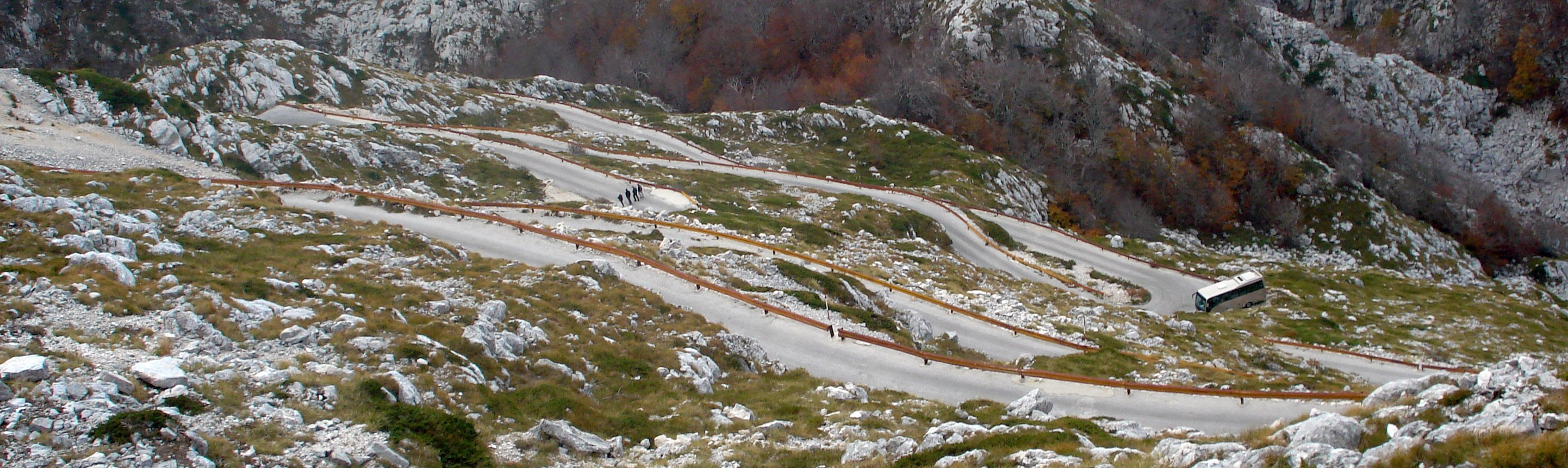
- Interactive map of Biokovo Road
- Elevation: 1,762 metres (5,781 ft)
- Length: 23 kilometres (14 mi)

Third Approach
- Location: Split-Dalmatia County, Croatia
- Range: Biokovo

The Biokovo Road (Croatian: Biokovska cesta) is, at 1,762 m.a.s.l., the highest road in Croatia. It is a one-lane access road that branches out from the D512 Makarska-Vrgorac state road at 365 m.a.s.l. and ends at Sveti Jure, the highest peak of Biokovo and the third highest peak in Croatia.

The road is windy, steep and narrow, only 3 to 4 meters wide near the top, and is not recommended for less skilled drivers.

Biokovo Road was originally built up to 897 m.a.s.l. by the Austro-Hungarian Army in 1878. In 1964, it was extended to the top of the mountain in order to install a television transmitter there. The road was paved in 1978.

== See also ==
- List of highest paved roads in Europe
- List of highest paved roads in Europe by country
- List of mountain passes
