= Killhope Cross =

Mountain pass in the Pennines, England

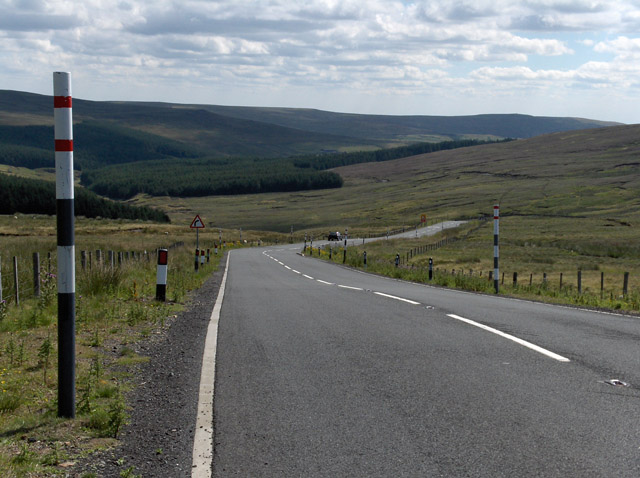

- Location within Cumbria
- Elevation: 627 metres (2,057 ft)
- Traversed by: A689

Third Approach
- Location: Cornriggs (Weardale) & Nenthead (Alston, Cumbria), England
- Coordinates: 54°47′01″N 2°18′48″W

Killhope Cross (elevation 627 m; 2,057 ft) is a mountain pass in the English Pennines. The pass divides Weardale to the east and Cumbria to the west. The road over the pass, the (A689) from Hartlepool to Carlisle, Cumbria, connects the hamlet of Cornriggs in County Durham with the town of Alston, Cumbria. It is the equal highest paved pass in England with the Harthope Moss approximately 10 miles (16 km) to the south, on the other side of Burnhope Seat (747 m; 2,451 ft).

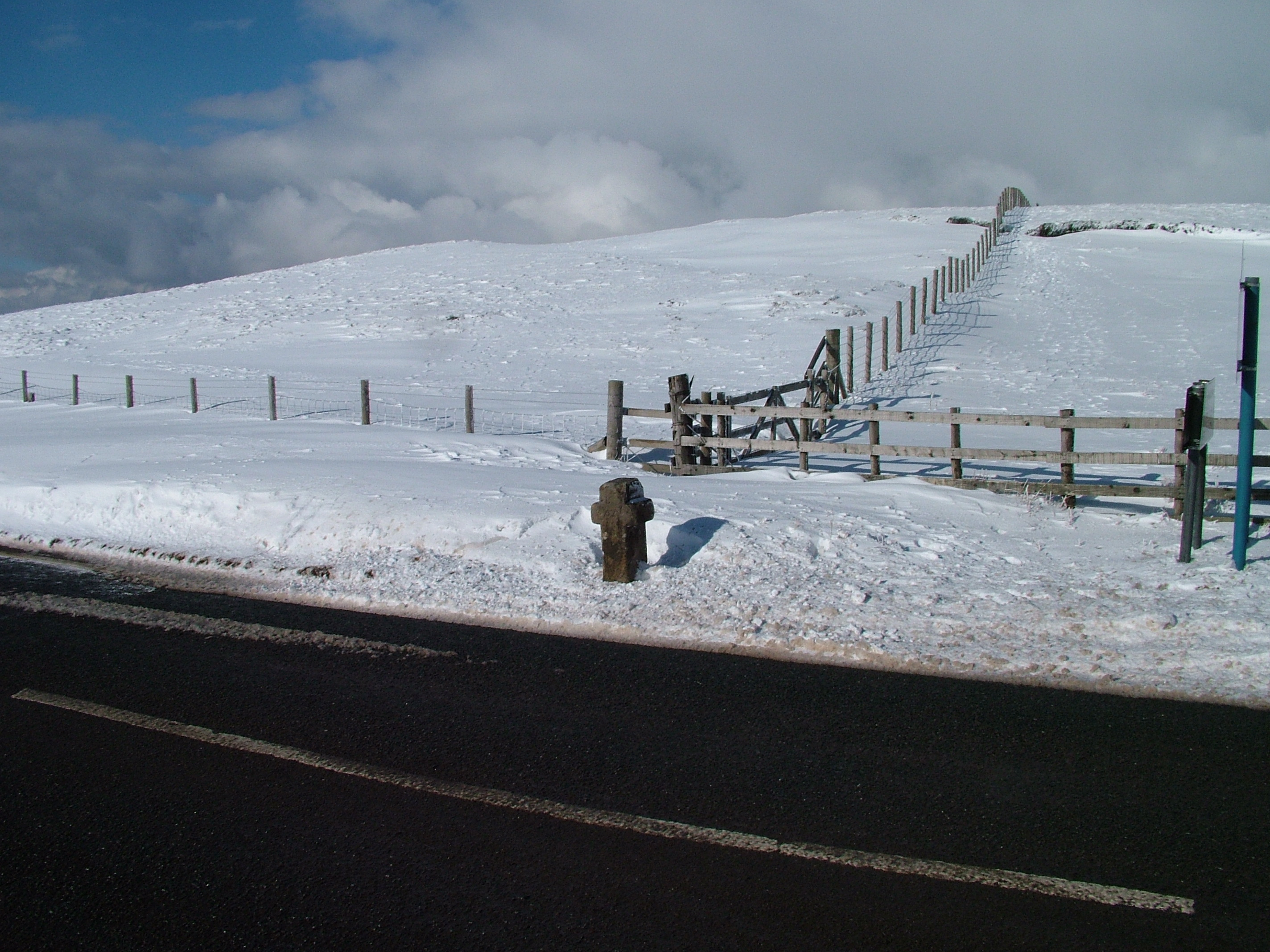
The cross at Killhope Cross

The pass is named for a Grade-II-listed boundary cross at the highest point of the pass, described as "of uncertain date but possibly medieval".

== See also ==
- List of highest paved roads in Europe
- List of mountain passes
