= 2005 Tour de Hongrie =

Race details
- Dates: 2–7 August
- Stages: 8 + Prologue
- Distance: 705.4 km (438.3 mi)
- Winning time: 16h 52' 23"

Results
Jersey awarded to the overall winner	Winner	Tamás Lengyel (HUN)	(P-Nívó Betonexpressz)
	Second	Martin Prázdnovský (SVK)	(Podbrezová)
	Third	Glen Chadwick (AUS)	(Cyclingnews.com)
Jersey awarded to the points classification winner	Points	Gerald Ciolek (GER)	(Winfix-Arnolds Sicherheit)
Jersey awarded to the mountains classification winner	Mountains	Glen Chadwick (AUS)	(Cyclingnews.com)
	Team	Podbrezová	

The 2005 Tour de Hongrie was the 32nd edition of the Tour de Hongrie cycle race and was held from 2 to 7 August 2005. The race started in Veszprém and finished in Budapest. The race was won by Tamás Lengyel.

== General classification ==
Final general classification

Rank	Rider	Team	Time
1	Tamás Lengyel (HUN)	P-Nívó Betonexpressz	16h 52' 23"
2	Martin Prázdnovský (SVK)	Podbrezová	+ 45"
3	Glen Chadwick (AUS)	Cyclingnews.com	+ 1' 53"
