= Coral Cave =

Marble cave in Sweden

Coordinates: 64°52′N 14°06′E

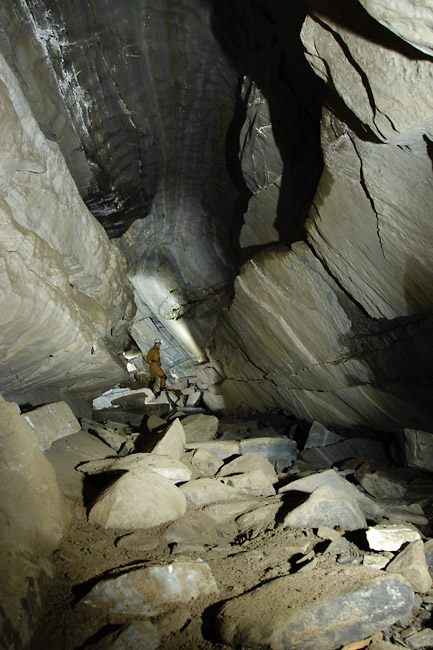
The Coral Cave

The Coral Cave (Swedish: Korallgrottan) is a marble cave at the northernmost tip of Jämtland, near Ankarvattnet, Sweden. It was discovered in 1985. So far, six kilometres of it have been explored, making it Sweden's longest cave. Members of the public are not allowed to visit the Coral Cave without a guide.
