= Glen Chadwick =

New Zealand cyclist (born 1976)

Personal information
- Full name: Glen Alan Chadwick
- Born: 17 October 1976 (age 49) Ōpunake, New Zealand

Cycling career
- Sport: Cycling
- Current team: Retired
- Discipline: Road
- Role: Rider
- Rider type: All-Rounder

Amateur team
- 2001–2002: Landbouwkrediet–Colnago

Professional teams
- 2003–2004: Giant Asia Racing Team
- 2005: Team Cyclingnews.com Fondriest
- 2006–2007: Navigators Insurance
- 2008: Team Type 1
- 2009: Rock Racing
- 2010: Team Budget Forklifts
- 2011: PureBlack Racing

Major wins
- One-day races and Classics National Time Trial Championships (2007)

Glen Alan Chadwick (born 17 October 1976) is a cyclist with both New Zealand and Australian citizenship.

== Career ==
In 1998 Chadwick helped fellow kiwi Nathan Dahlberg setup the Marco Polo Cycling Team team. Glen Chadwick began his career in 2001 at the Belgian cycling team Landbouwkrediet–Colnago. In his first year, he came second in the general classification of the Tour de Liège. After two years he moved to Taiwan to ride for the Giant Asia Racing Team. Here he would win in his first year the Tour of Korea and the Tour of Beijing. In 2005 he rode for the Australian UCI Continental team Cyclingnews.com. After two years (2006, 2007) at the American UCI Professional Continental team Navigators Insurance he moved to Team Type 1 in 2008. During 2008 he won the Overall at the Vuelta Mexico Telmex. In 2009 he joined Rock Racing. Chadwick was part of the team sent to race the road race at the 2008 Summer Olympics.

== Major results ==
2000
1st Overall Tour of Tasmania

1st Stage 4

6th Overall Commonwealth Bank Classic

1st Stage 10

2001
4th Memorial Philippe Van Coningsloo
10th Grote Prijs Stad Sint-Niklaas
2002
1st Stage 4 Tour of South China Sea
2nd Overall Tour of Qinghai Lake
9th Overall Tour de Serbia
2003
1st Overall Tour de Korea

1st Stage 3

3rd Giro d'Oro
4th Grote 1-MeiPrijs
8th Overall International Tour of Hellas
2005
1st Tour du Jura
2nd Internationale Wielertrofee Jong Maar Moedig
3rd Overall Tour de Hongrie

1st Stage 5

6th Overall Tour de Beauce
2006
2nd Overall Tour of Utah
4th Overall Cascade Cycling Classic
2007
National Championships

1st Time trial
5th Road race

Tour de Beauce

1st Stages 2 & 3

2008
1st Overall Vuelta Mexico Telmex
3rd Overall Tour of Utah
5th Overall Tour de Beauce

1st Mountains classification

6th Overall Herald Sun Tour
7th Overall Tour of Southland
2009
1st Stage 13 Vuelta a Colombia
5th Overall Vuelta Mexico Telmex
6th Overall Tour of Southland
7th Overall Vuelta Asturias

1st Stage 1

2010
8th Overall Tour of the Gila
10th Overall Tour of Southland
10th Overall Cascade Cycling Classic
