= Arturo Grávalos =

Spanish cyclist (1998–2023)

Personal information
- Full name: Arturo Grávalos López
- Born: 2 March 1998 Zaragoza, Spain
- Died: 19 May 2023 (aged 25)
- Height: 1.85 m (6 ft 1 in)
- Weight: 72 kg (159 lb)

Cycling career
- Sport: Cycling
- Discipline: Road
- Role: Rider

Amateur teams
- 2017–2018: Caja Rural–Seguros RGA amateur
- 2019–2020: Kometa U23

Professional teams
- 2020: Kometa Xstra Cycling Team (stagiaire)
- 2021–2022: Eolo–Kometa

Arturo Grávalos López (2 March 1998 – 19 May 2023) was a Spanish racing cyclist.

Gravels competed for UCI ProTeam Eolo–Kometa from 2021 to 2022, after riding as a stagiaire for the team in 2020. He notably competed in the 2021 Strade Bianche and finished second in the Spanish National Under-23 Road Race Championships in 2019.

Grávalos died from brain cancer on 19 May 2023, at the age of 25. He had been diagnosed with a tumor in 2021.

== Major results ==
2016
1st Gipuzkoa Klasika
1st Premio Primavera juniors
2019
2nd Road race, National Under-23 Road Championships
