= Munsvattnet =

Coordinates: 64°16′N 14°27′E

Munsvattnet is a small village in Strömsund Municipality, Sweden, to the west of Lars-Thomas, with a population of 108.
