= Jakub Mareczko =

Italian road cyclist

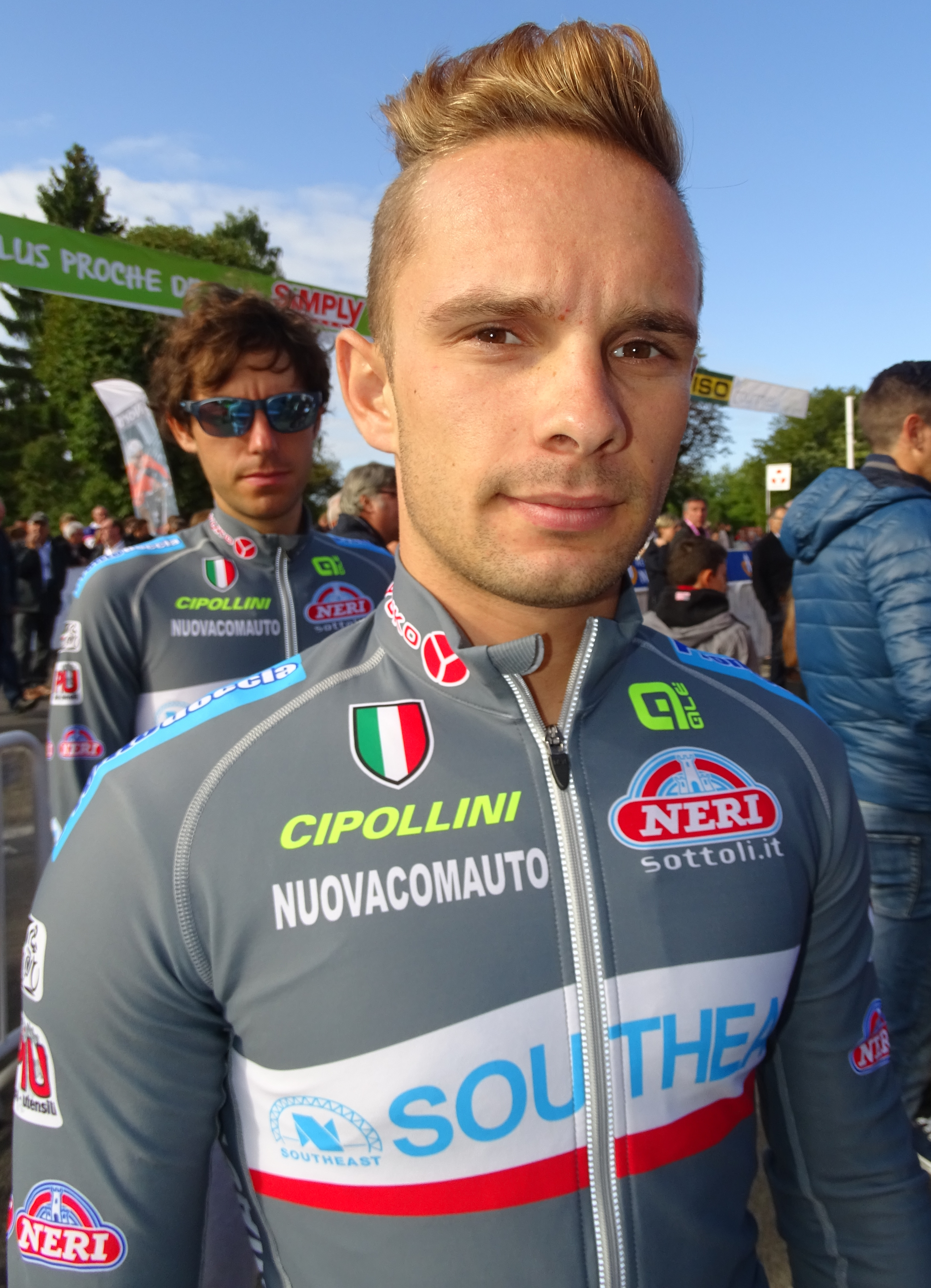
- Mareczko in 2015.

Personal information
- Full name: Jakub Mareczko
- Born: 30 April 1994 (age 32) Jarosław, Poland
- Height: 1.69 m (5 ft 7 in)
- Weight: 68 kg (150 lb)

Cycling career
- Sport: Cycling
- Current team: Mazowsze Serce Polski
- Discipline: Road
- Role: Rider
- Rider type: Sprinter

Amateur team
- 2013–2014: Viris Maserati

Professional teams
- 2015–2018: Southeast Pro Cycling
- 2019–2020: CCC Team
- 2021: Vini Zabù
- 2022–2023: Alpecin–Fenix
- 2024: Team Corratec–Vini Fantini
- 2025–: Mazowsze Serce Polski

Jakub Mareczko (born 30 April 1994) is a Polish road cyclist, who rides for UCI Continental team Mazowsze Serce Polski. Prior to 2025, he competed under Italian nationality.

A sprinter, Mareczko was described by the Italian national cycling coach Davide Cassani as one of the best young hopes for Italian cycling.

== Career ==
Mareczko was born in Poland on 30 April 1994; he moved with his mother to Brescia, Italy, when he was five years old.

=== Southeast Pro Cycling (2015–18) ===
It was announced that Mareczko had signed his first professional contract with the then Neri Sottoli in July 2014. Racing as an amateur cyclist in the 2013 and 2014 seasons, he won 16 races and came to the attention of Davide Cassani. He was the most successful under-23 rider in Italy in 2014. Mareczko was seen as one of the major hopes for Southeast Pro Cycling, which had been in significant trouble on account of repeated doping cases; the team also signed the veteran sprinter Alessandro Petacchi with the hope that he would be able to help Mareczko to develop as a cyclist (in particular to get stronger on the climbs), as well as potentially leading him out in the sprints.

Mareczko's first wins as a professional cyclist came in the 2015 Vuelta al Táchira (a 2.2 race where many of the riders are amateurs), where he won stages 3 and 4. He was then selected to lead the Italian national team in the sprint stages at the Tour de San Luis, where he twice finished in the top ten, including a third place on the final stage behind Mark Cavendish and Fernando Gaviria. He started both Omloop Het Nieuwsblad and Kuurne–Brussels–Kuurne but finished neither. He finished third on the second stage of the Tour de Langkawi, then finished second on the fourth and sixth stages. Mareczko's cobbled classics season then continued with his participation in Dwars door Vlaanderen, E3 Harelbeke, Gent–Wevelgem, the Three Days of De Panne and the Scheldeprijs, although he finished none of these races. Mareczko won two stages at the Vuelta a Venezuela, a 2.2-ranked race. His first professional-level victory came at the end of the 2015 road racing season, when he won the sixth stage of the 2.HC-ranked Tour of Hainan. A few days before this victory, Southeast Pro Cycling announced that his contract had been renewed for the following two seasons. It was followed by more victories in China: at the 2.1-ranked Tour of Taihu Lake, Mareczko won all seven of the nine stages to end in bunch sprints. He also won the general classification, the points classification and the young rider classification.

He was named in the start list for the 2016 Giro d'Italia, but abandoned the race on Stage 5.

=== Post-Southeast (2019–present) ===
In October 2020, he was named in the startlist for the Vuelta a España, recording a best stage finish of third place on the fourth stage. The following month, he signed a two-year contract with the Vini Zabù team, from the 2021 season. However, Vini Zabù folded at the end of the 2021 season, and Mareczko joined Alpecin–Fenix for the 2022 season.

At the 2022 ZLM Toer Mareczko won the bunch sprint for Stage 2 however, he was relegated soon after and Olav Kooij named as the winner. Mareczko won the following day's stage into Buchten, and ultimately finished the race second overall, behind Kooij.

== Major results ==
2014
1st Circuito del Porto
2015 (9 pro wins)
1st Overall Tour of Taihu Lake

1st Points classification
1st Young rider classification
1st Stages 1, 2, 3, 6, 7, 8 & 9

Vuelta al Táchira

1st Stages 3 & 4

Vuelta a Venezuela

1st Stages 2 & 9

1st Stage 6 Tour of Hainan
2016 (11)
1st Tour of Yancheng Coastal Wetlands
Tour of Qinghai Lake

1st Stage 2, 11 & 13

Presidential Tour of Turkey

1st Stages 5 & 8

Tour of Taihu Lake

1st Points classification
1st Stages 1, 2 & 6

1st Stage 7 Tour de San Luis
1st Stage 6 Tour de Langkawi
1st Stage 3 Settimana Internazionale di Coppi e Bartali
3rd Road race, UCI Under-23 Road World Championships
10th Grand Prix d'Isbergues
2017 (13)
1st Overall Tour of Taihu Lake

1st Points classification
1st Young rider classification
1st Stages 2, 3, 4, 6 & 7

Tour of Hainan

1st Points classification
1st Stages 2, 3, 4, 5 & 6

Tour de Langkawi

1st Stages 3 & 7

1st Stage 3 Tour de Bretagne
2018 (7)
Tour du Maroc

1st Points classification
1st Stages 1, 3, 5, 7, 9 & 10

Sharjah Tour

1st Points classification
1st Stages 2 & 4

Tour of Taihu Lake

1st Stages 3, 5 & 7

1st Stage 5 Tour of China II
1st Stage 1 Tour of Hainan
2019
3rd Grand Prix Pino Cerami
6th Primus Classic
2020 (3)
Tour de Hongrie

1st Points classification
1st Stages 2, 3 & 4

2021 (2)
1st Trofej Umag
1st Stage 1a Settimana Internazionale di Coppi e Bartali
6th Gran Piemonte
2022 (3)
Tour of Antalya

1st Points classification
1st Stage 4

1st Stage 4 Tour de Langkawi
2nd Overall ZLM Toer

1st Stage 3

4th Veenendaal–Veenendaal Classic
2023 (1)
1st Stage 2 ZLM Tour
1st Stage 5 Tour de Bretagne
4th Veenendaal–Veenendaal Classic
5th Bredene Koksijde Classic
7th Van Merksteijn Fences Classic
2024 (2)
1st Circuito del Porto
1st Stage 1b International Tour of Hellas
1st Stage 1 Tour of Hainan
2nd GP Adria Mobil
3rd Trofej Umag
2025
1st Stage 4 Tour of Mersin

=== Grand Tour general classification results timeline ===
Grand Tour	2016	2017	2018	2019	2020	2021	2022
Giro d'Italia	DNF	DNF	DNF	DNF	—	—	DNF
Tour de France	Has not contested during his career						
Vuelta a España	—	—	—	—	DNF	—	—

Legend
—	Did not compete
DNF	Did not finish
IP	In progress
