= Gäddede =

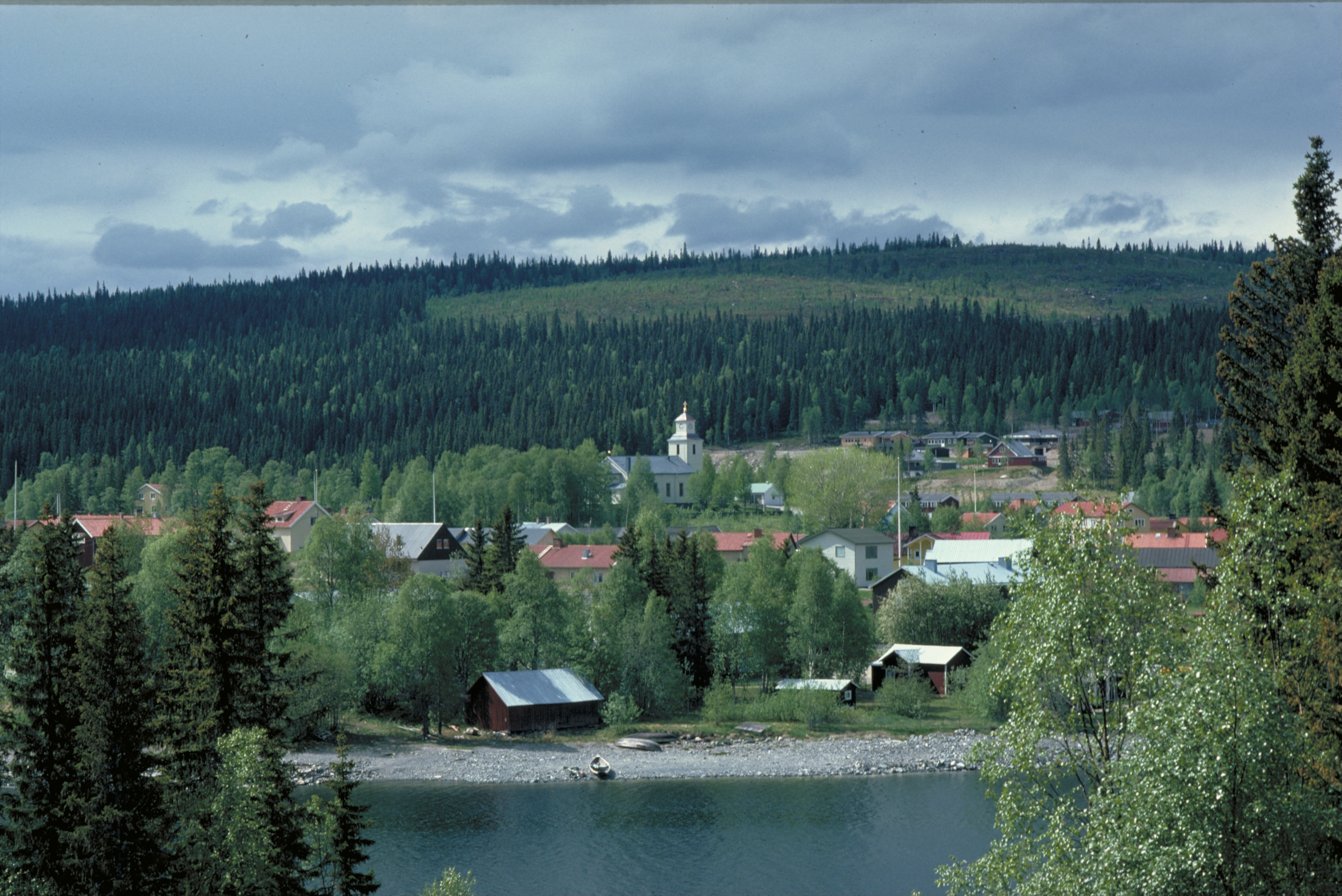
- Gäddede in the 1970s

- Location within Jämtland Location within Sweden
- Coordinates: 64°30′N 14°09′E
- Country: Sweden
- Province: Jämtland
- County: Jämtland County
- Municipality: Strömsund Municipality

Area
  - Total: 1.36 km^{2} (0.53 sq mi)

Population (31 December 2010)
  - Total: 401
  - Density: 294/km^{2} (760/sq mi)
- Time zone: UTC+1 (CET)
  - Summer (DST): UTC+2 (CEST)

Gäddede is a locality in Strömsund Municipality, Jämtland County, Sweden with 401 inhabitants in 2010. It is located in the far north-western corner of the municipality and it is more than 100 kilometres (62 mi) to the locality of Strömsund by road. Gäddede is located a mere 5 kilometres (3.1 mi) from the Norway-Sweden border.

== Climate ==
The Swedish weather service (SMHI) operates a weather station in Gäddede. With a normal value of 8 °C (46 °F) for September, the climate is subarctic (Dfc) with a significant maritime influence from the Gulf Stream. Gäddede is along with Storlien and Riksgränsen one of very few localities in Sweden that lies less than 100 kilometres (62 mi) from the open North Atlantic sea. As a result, the effects on the local climate is greater than further inland or on the east coast. The maritime air often blocks continental air during summers, causing chilly temperatures. During some winters however, temperatures hover just below freezing when low-pressure systems are strong. Due to winter precipitation being high, Gäddede has a predictable snow cover for several months.

Due to its elevation of 300 metres (980 ft), Gäddede is also cooled down compared to what a location near sea level would be. Even so, Gäddede is below the tree line by a sizeable margin.

Climate data for Gäddede (2002–2018 averages; extremes since 1905)
Month	Jan	Feb	Mar	Apr	May	Jun	Jul	Aug	Sep	Oct	Nov	Dec	Year
Record high °C (°F)	9.2 (48.6)	8.5 (47.3)	12.6 (54.7)	19.0 (66.2)	27.6 (81.7)	30.3 (86.5)	32.0 (89.6)	29.0 (84.2)	24.0 (75.2)	19.1 (66.4)	11.9 (53.4)	8.4 (47.1)	32.0 (89.6)
Mean maximum °C (°F)	2.4 (36.3)	2.9 (37.2)	5.6 (42.1)	12.5 (54.5)	20.8 (69.4)	23.8 (74.8)	26.0 (78.8)	23.9 (75.0)	18.2 (64.8)	11.1 (52.0)	6.1 (43.0)	4.0 (39.2)	26.6 (79.9)
Mean daily maximum °C (°F)	−4.5 (23.9)	−3.8 (25.2)	−0.3 (31.5)	5.1 (41.2)	11.1 (52.0)	15.6 (60.1)	19.0 (66.2)	16.9 (62.4)	11.3 (52.3)	4.5 (40.1)	−0.2 (31.6)	−2.3 (27.9)	6.0 (42.9)
Daily mean °C (°F)	−7.6 (18.3)	−7.0 (19.4)	−4.2 (24.4)	1.1 (34.0)	6.3 (43.3)	10.5 (50.9)	14.0 (57.2)	12.3 (54.1)	8.0 (46.4)	2.0 (35.6)	−2.6 (27.3)	−5.2 (22.6)	2.3 (36.1)
Mean daily minimum °C (°F)	−10.6 (12.9)	−10.2 (13.6)	−8.1 (17.4)	−2.9 (26.8)	1.5 (34.7)	5.4 (41.7)	8.9 (48.0)	7.7 (45.9)	4.6 (40.3)	−0.5 (31.1)	−4.9 (23.2)	−8.0 (17.6)	−1.4 (29.4)
Mean minimum °C (°F)	−24.7 (−12.5)	−23.0 (−9.4)	−19.8 (−3.6)	−11.8 (10.8)	−5.6 (21.9)	−0.7 (30.7)	2.7 (36.9)	1.0 (33.8)	−2.0 (28.4)	−9.2 (15.4)	−14.5 (5.9)	−19.6 (−3.3)	−27.2 (−17.0)
Record low °C (°F)	−40.4 (−40.7)	−38.2 (−36.8)	−36.8 (−34.2)	−24.8 (−12.6)	−14.3 (6.3)	−4.8 (23.4)	−0.9 (30.4)	−3.0 (26.6)	−6.8 (19.8)	−16.4 (2.5)	−24.4 (−11.9)	−40.2 (−40.4)	−40.4 (−40.7)
Average precipitation mm (inches)	59.5 (2.34)	47.5 (1.87)	54.0 (2.13)	45.0 (1.77)	48.7 (1.92)	61.6 (2.43)	85.3 (3.36)	71.9 (2.83)	77.9 (3.07)	56.8 (2.24)	54.9 (2.16)	71.5 (2.81)	734.6 (28.93)
Source 1: SMHI Open Data
Source 2: SMHI climate data 2002–2018

Climate data for Gäddede A 1991-2020 normals (553m)
Month	Jan	Feb	Mar	Apr	May	Jun	Jul	Aug	Sep	Oct	Nov	Dec	Year
Mean daily maximum °C (°F)	−3.8 (25.2)	−4.1 (24.6)	−1.0 (30.2)	3.8 (38.8)	9.3 (48.7)	14.5 (58.1)	17.4 (63.3)	15.8 (60.4)	10.4 (50.7)	3.9 (39.0)	−0.7 (30.7)	−2.8 (27.0)	5.2 (41.4)
Daily mean °C (°F)	−7.0 (19.4)	−7.4 (18.7)	−4.6 (23.7)	−0.1 (31.8)	4.8 (40.6)	9.4 (48.9)	12.5 (54.5)	11.3 (52.3)	6.8 (44.2)	1.4 (34.5)	−2.9 (26.8)	−5.4 (22.3)	1.6 (34.8)
Mean daily minimum °C (°F)	−10.2 (13.6)	−10.8 (12.6)	−8.5 (16.7)	−4.0 (24.8)	0.7 (33.3)	5.3 (41.5)	8.2 (46.8)	7.4 (45.3)	3.8 (38.8)	−1.0 (30.2)	−5.7 (21.7)	−8.6 (16.5)	−1.9 (28.5)
Average precipitation mm (inches)	66.6 (2.62)	53.1 (2.09)	52.1 (2.05)	40.3 (1.59)	44.4 (1.75)	65.8 (2.59)	88.6 (3.49)	72.1 (2.84)	67.6 (2.66)	58.5 (2.30)	54.5 (2.15)	60.9 (2.40)	724.5 (28.53)
Source: NOAA

== See also ==
- Munsvattnet
