= Jormvattnet =

Coordinates: 64°43′N 14°03′E

Jormvattnet or Jorm (Swedish pronunciation: [ˈjɔrm]) is a village in Strömsund Municipality, Jämtland County, Jämtland, Sweden. It overlooks a lake with islands, Lake Jormvattnet, and is overshadowed by a mountain, Jormliklumpen. It is a picturesque region and is used by tourists for horse riding and hiking. It had a population of 64 in 2005.
