= St John's Chapel, County Durham =

Coordinates: 54.73681°N 2.18003°W

St John's Chapel
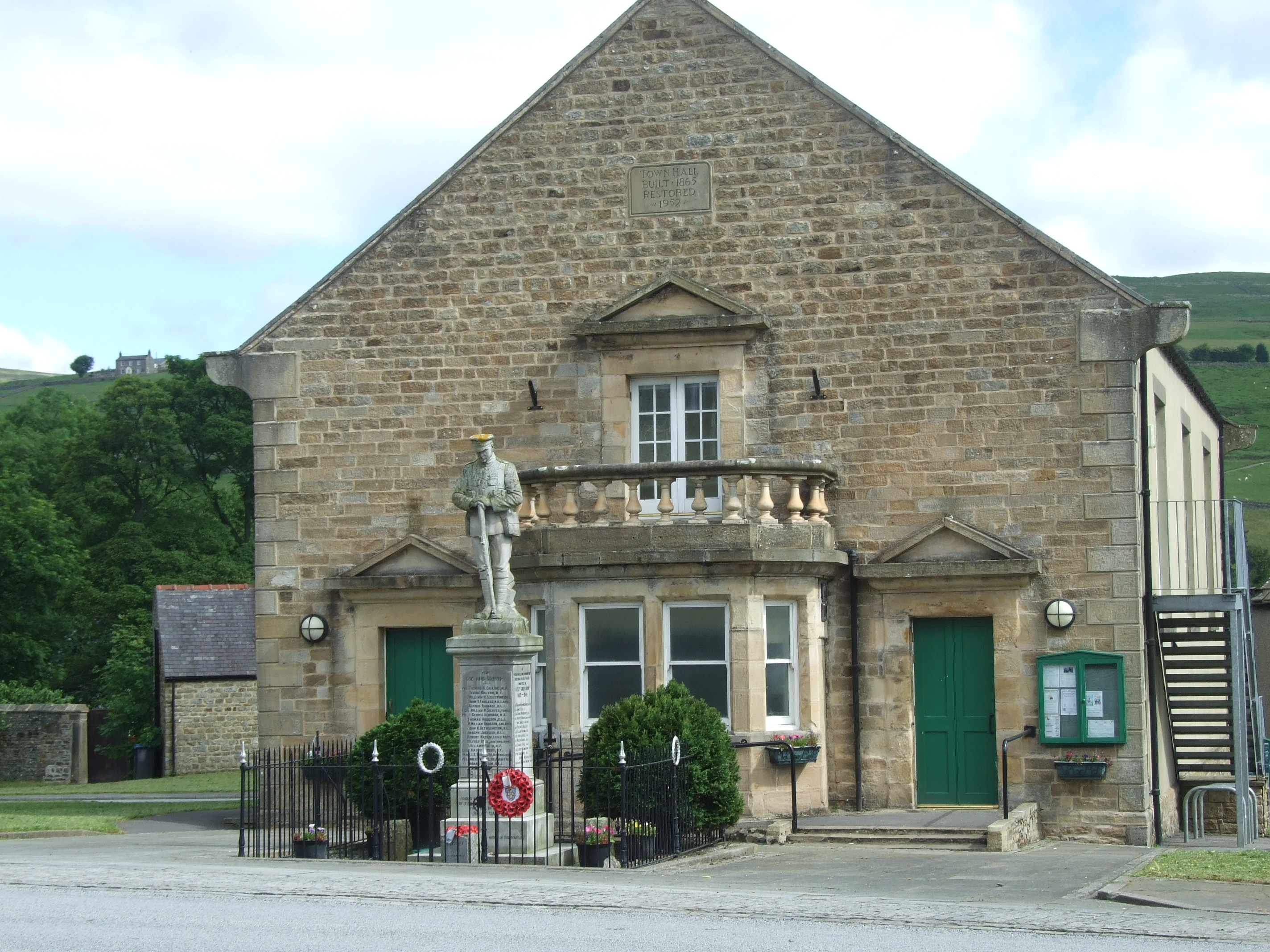
- St John's Chapel Town Hall

- Location within County Durham
- Population: 307 (2001 census)
- OS grid reference: NY883380
- Civil parish: Stanhope
- Unitary authority: County Durham
- Ceremonial county: Durham
- Region: North East
- Country: England
- Sovereign state: United Kingdom
- Post town: Bishop Auckland
- Postcode district: DL13
- Police: Durham
- Fire: County Durham and Darlington
- Ambulance: North East
- UK Parliament: Bishop Auckland

St John's Chapel is a village in the civil parish of Stanhope, in County Durham, England. It is situated in Weardale, on the south side of the River Wear on the A689 road between Daddry Shield and Ireshopeburn. The 2001 census reported a population of 307.

The village has its own primary school, which in 2014 was graded at "outstanding" by Ofsted. The nearest secondary schools are in Alston (12 miles) and Wolsingham (14 miles). The nearest swimming pool is 14 miles away and the nearest library is 22 miles away. This population makes the village marginal in terms of thresholds for service provision. Although the population of the ward (1,446, including surrounding hamlets) has remained fairly stable for 30 years, this masks the out-migration mainly of the younger generation affecting the population structure.

Although this area has a high quality of life with low pollution and crime rates, in 2001 16 residents were unemployed and 26% of households were without a car. Originally St John's chapel was a medieval hunting stop, it then grew as a centre of lead mining after 1600.

The parish Church is dedicated to St John the Baptist (from where the place name originates). The present building was built in 1752 on a medieval chapel of ease. The medieval chapel was extant in 1465 when bishop Lawrence Booth granted a chantry to be set up. Sir Walter Blackett provided funds for the re- building. The chancel was extended by Ewan Christian 1881–1883.

A Primitive Methodist chapel was built in 1852 and demolished in 1960. The Wesleyan Methodist chapel was built in 1869. St John's Chapel Town Hall was completed in 1868.

St John's Chapel was the penultimate stop of the Weardale Extension Railway which opened on 21 October 1895, being mainly a freight line carrying limestone, iron ore, lead ore and fluorspar to the industrial areas of North East England. It closed to passenger traffic in 1953 and later to freight in 1963. The station was entirely demolished.

Being situated in the North Pennines Area of Outstanding Natural Beauty, St John's Chapel is increasingly popular with cyclists, walkers and bird watchers. In 2013 a Visitor Information Point was opened in the Market Place. The village has two pubs and one cafe.

The Weardale Show - organised by the Weardale Agricultural Society - is a family-friendly agricultural event held in the village in the last weekend of August.
