= Ankarvattnet =

Lake in Strömsund Municipality, Sweden

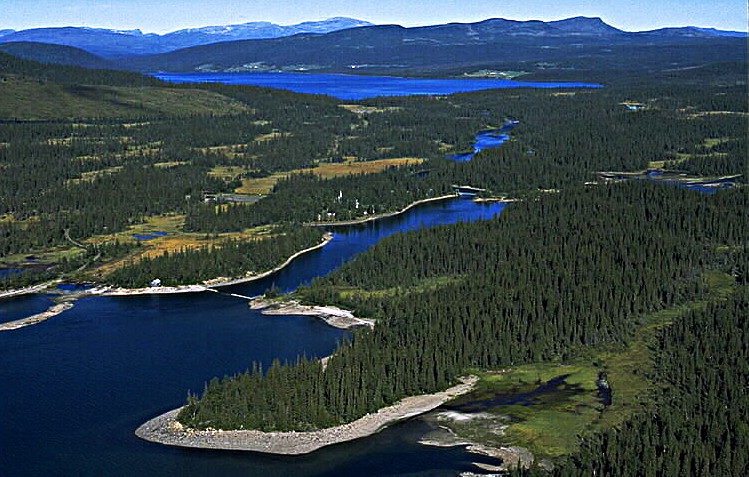
- Ankarvattnet (in the distance)

- Location within Sweden
- Location: Strömsund (Jämtland)
- Coordinates: 64°52′0″N 14°13′0″E
- Basin countries: Sweden
- Surface area: 9 km^{2} (3.5 sq mi)
- Max. depth: 44 m (144 ft)
- Surface elevation: 448 m (1,470 ft)

Ankarvattnet is a lake in Strömsund Municipality, Jämtland county, Sweden. It is possible to fish only trout and char.

== See also ==
- List of lakes in Sweden
