= Klimpfjäll =

Klimpfjäll Klimhpe el. Klimhpese
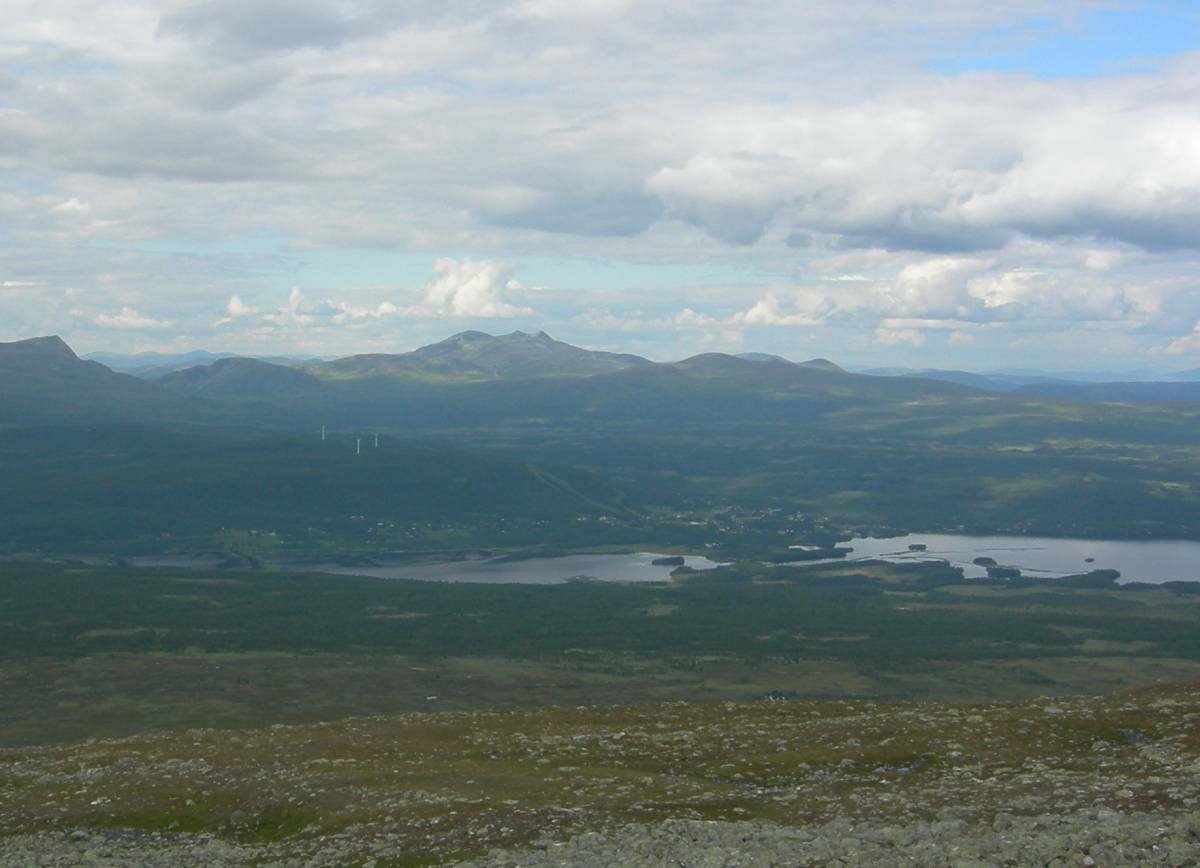
- 2010 view of Klimpfjäll from Autjoklimpen

- Location within Västerbotten Location within Sweden
- Coordinates: 65°4′N 14°46′E
- Country: Sweden
- Province: Lapland
- County: Västerbotten County
- Municipality: Vilhelmina Municipality

Area
  - Total: 049 km^{2} (19 sq mi)

Population (31 December 2005)
  - Total: 132
  - Density: 271/km^{2} (700/sq mi)
- Time zone: UTC+1 (CET)
  - Summer (DST): UTC+2 (CEST)

Klimpfjäll (Southern Sami language: Klimhpe el. Klimhpese) is a village located in Vilhelmina Municipality, Västerbotten County, Sweden, about 20 km from the border to Norway and 120 km from Vilhelmina. Until the end of the 1980s, the village was a mining community and the population was well above 500. Following the closing of the mining, it declined to about 100 inhabitants in 2013.

In the village there are several small companies focusing on tourism. During the wintertime many choose to visit Klimpfjäll for snowmobiling, snowboarding, skiing and ice fishing. There is a slalom slope located in the village with various levels of difficulty on the slopes, one for smaller kids and an additional 13 slopes for the more experienced skier.

The village has a hotel and one shop besides from the slalom slope. There are various tracks for snow mobilers and in the summer multiple mountains to climb.

== Climate ==
Climate data for Klimpfjäll 1991-2020 normals (594m)
Month	Jan	Feb	Mar	Apr	May	Jun	Jul	Aug	Sep	Oct	Nov	Dec	Year
Mean daily maximum °C (°F)	−4.7 (23.5)	−4.8 (23.4)	−1.5 (29.3)	3.1 (37.6)	8.5 (47.3)	13.9 (57.0)	17.1 (62.8)	15.3 (59.5)	10.1 (50.2)	3.5 (38.3)	−1.3 (29.7)	−3.5 (25.7)	4.6 (40.4)
Daily mean °C (°F)	−8.4 (16.9)	−8.8 (16.2)	−6.0 (21.2)	−1.6 (29.1)	3.4 (38.1)	8.5 (47.3)	11.7 (53.1)	10.3 (50.5)	5.9 (42.6)	0.3 (32.5)	−4.4 (24.1)	−6.9 (19.6)	0.3 (32.6)
Mean daily minimum °C (°F)	−12.4 (9.7)	−12.9 (8.8)	−10.2 (13.6)	−5.1 (22.8)	0.0 (32.0)	4.7 (40.5)	7.9 (46.2)	6.9 (44.4)	3.4 (38.1)	−1.5 (29.3)	−7.0 (19.4)	−10.4 (13.3)	−3.1 (26.5)
Average precipitation mm (inches)	69.1 (2.72)	58.1 (2.29)	50.9 (2.00)	33.1 (1.30)	33.7 (1.33)	51.9 (2.04)	74.2 (2.92)	69.8 (2.75)	62.9 (2.48)	57.8 (2.28)	58.5 (2.30)	71.0 (2.80)	691 (27.21)
Source: NOAA

== Sources ==
- Eniro Maps
- Information about population and area on Statistiska centralbyrån's website
- Klimpfjällsgården (Klimpfjäll Farm)'s website
- Norgefarargården's website
- klimpfjall.se
