= List of Cololejeunea species =

This is a list of binomial names in the liverwort genus of Cololejeunea, with just accepted species and not including synonyms.

The GBIF lists up to 534 species (as of June 2023), where as World Flora Online lists only 494 results.

== A ==
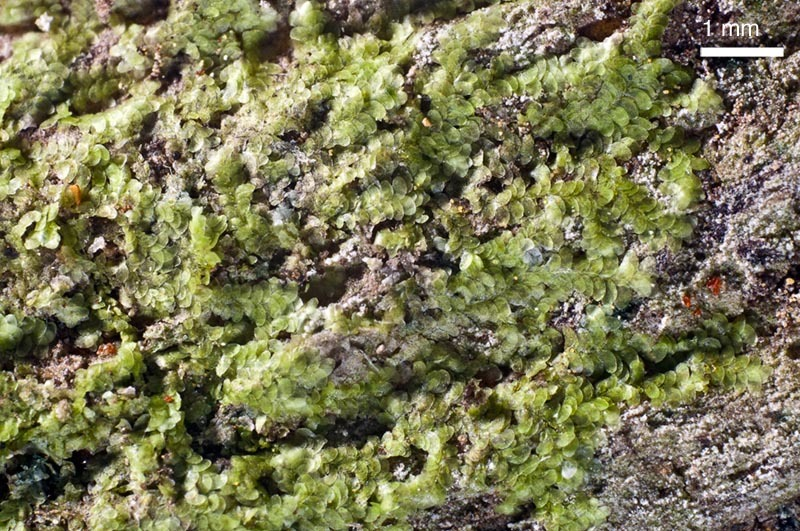
Cololejeunea appressa

- Cololejeunea abnormis Mizut.
- Cololejeunea acuminata Mizut.
- Cololejeunea adhaesiva (Mitt.) R.M.Schust.
- Cololejeunea adnata Tixier
- Cololejeunea aequabilis (Sande Lac.) Schiffn.
- Cololejeunea africana (Steph.) R.M.Schust.
- Cololejeunea albodentata P.C.Chen & P.C.Wu
- Cololejeunea altimontana Pócs
- Cololejeunea amaniensis Pócs
- Cololejeunea ambeliensis Tixier
- Cololejeunea amieuensis Tixier
- Cololejeunea amphibola B.M.Thiers
- Cololejeunea andamanensis M.Dey & D.K.Singh
- Cololejeunea andapania Tixier
- Cololejeunea androgyna Benedix
- Cololejeunea androphylla E.W.Jones
- Cololejeunea angulata (Steph.) Mizut.
- Cololejeunea angustibracteata Schiffn. ex P.Syd.
- Cololejeunea angustiflora (Steph.) Mizut.
- Cololejeunea angustiloba (Horik.) Mizut.
- Cololejeunea ankaiana Tixier
- Cololejeunea antillana Pócs
- Cololejeunea apiahyna (Stephani) O.Yano
- Cololejeunea apiculata (E.W.Jones) R.M.Schust.
- Cololejeunea appressa (A.Evans) Benedix
- Cololejeunea arfakiana Pocs & J.Eggers
- Cololejeunea armata Tixier
- Cololejeunea arrectifolia (Mitt.) Steph.
- Cololejeunea astyla Mizut.
- Cololejeunea attilana Pócs
- Cololejeunea augieri Tixier
- Cololejeunea aurantia (Tixier) Thouvenot
- Cololejeunea auriculata (E.W.Jones) R.M.Schust.
- Cololejeunea australis Tixier
- Cololejeunea autoica (Steph.) Grolle
- Cololejeunea azorica V.Allorge & Jovet-Ast

== B ==
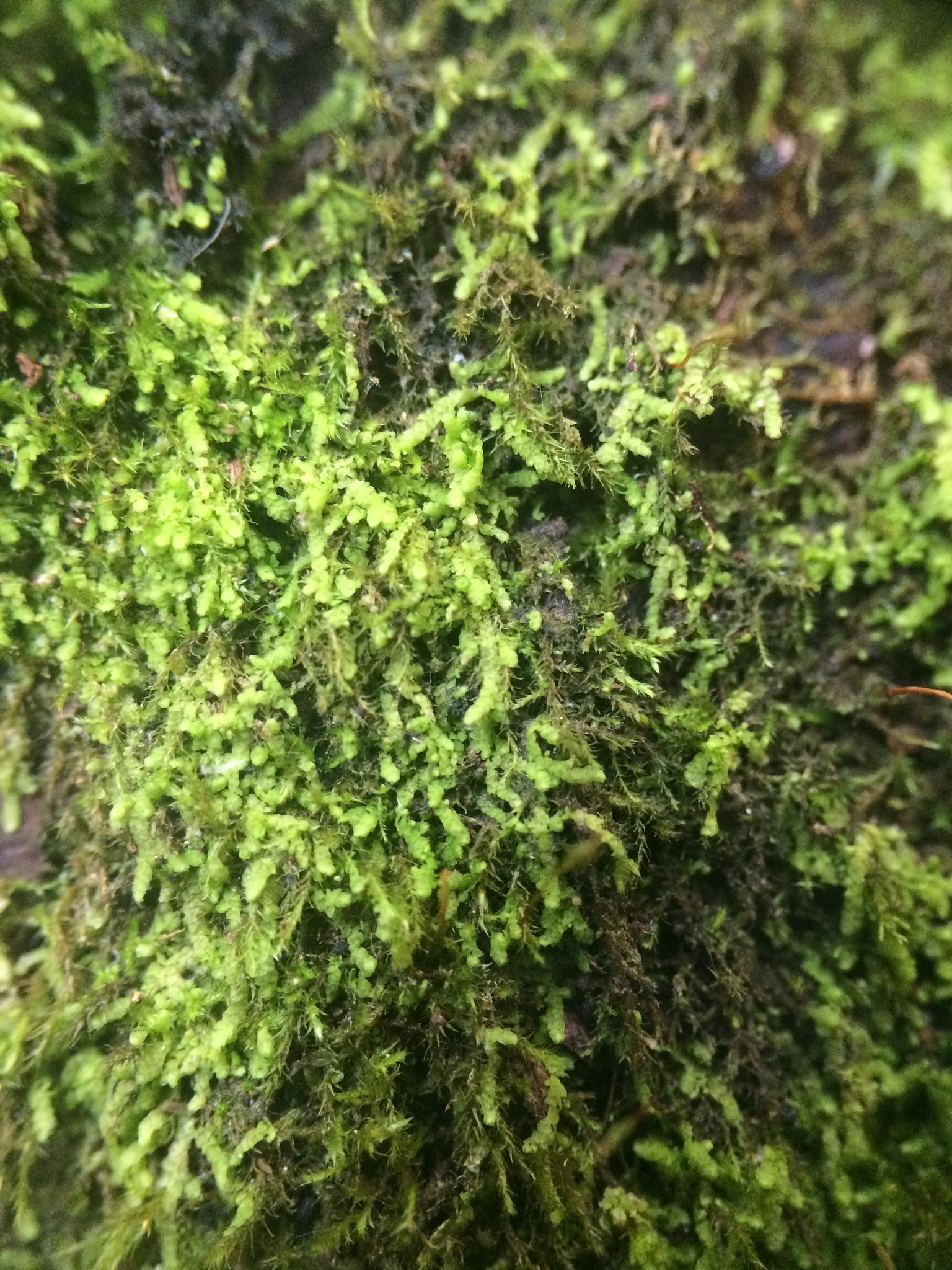
Cololejeunea biddlecomiae (Biddlecome's Pouncewort)

- Cololejeunea bachmaensis Tixier
- Cololejeunea balansae (Stephani) Mizut.
- Cololejeunea bandamiae Tixier
- Cololejeunea baudoinii Tixier
- Cololejeunea bebourensis Tixier
- Cololejeunea bekkeri Tixier
- Cololejeunea bergmansiana Tixier
- Cololejeunea berneckerae Pócs
- Cololejeunea bhutanica Grolle & Mizut.
- Cololejeunea biddlecomiae (Austin) A.Evans
- Cololejeunea bidentula (Steph.) E.W.Jones
- Cololejeunea bifalcata Pócs
- Cololejeunea bischleriana Tixier
- Cololejeunea blepharophylla Pócs
- Cololejeunea bokorensis Tixier
- Cololejeunea bolombensis (Stephani) Vanden Berghen
- Cololejeunea bolovenensis Tixier
- Cololejeunea bontocensis Tixier
- Cololejeunea borbonica Tixier
- Cololejeunea borhidiana Pócs
- Cololejeunea bosseriana Tixier
- Cololejeunea brunelii Tixier

== C ==
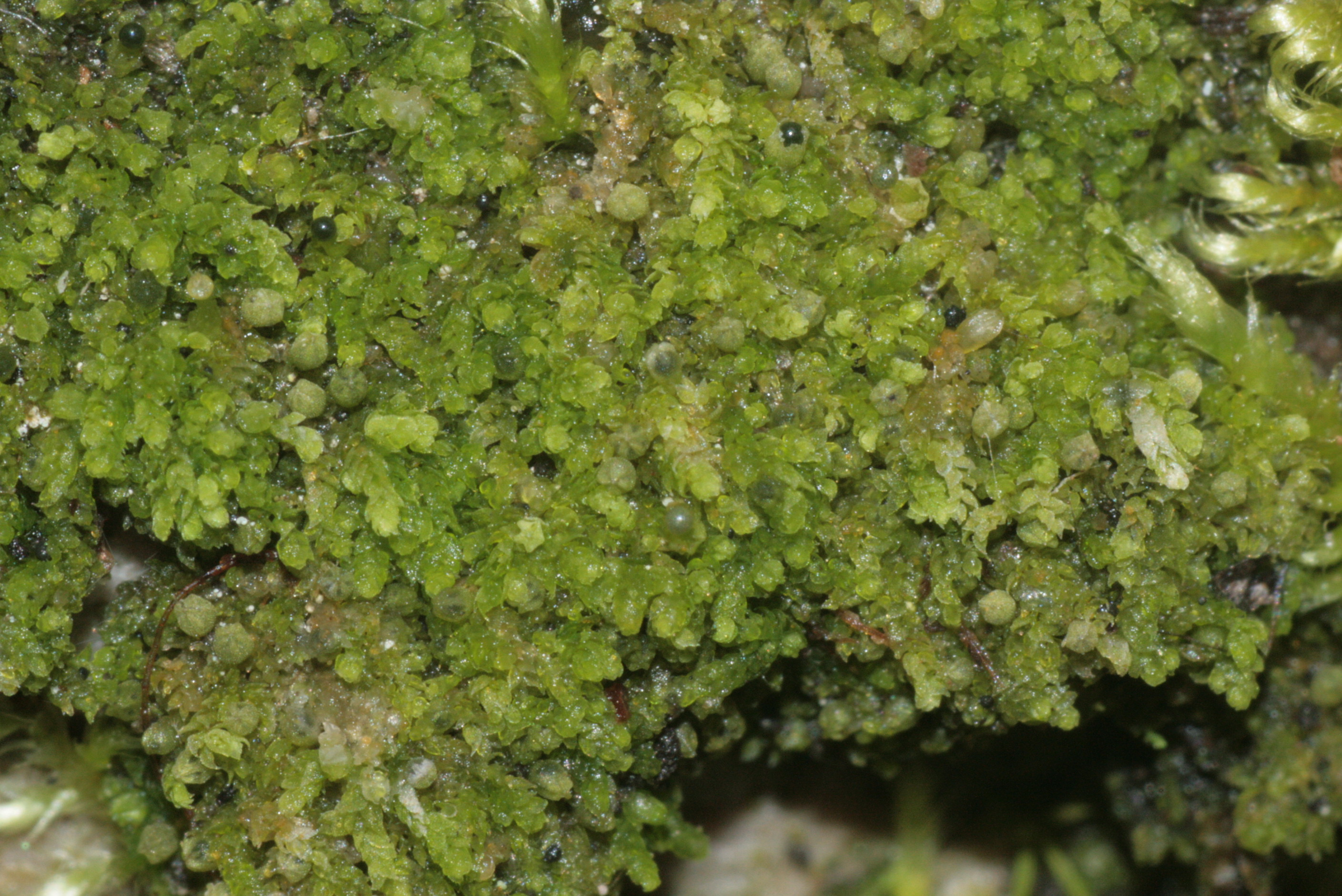
Cololejeunea calcarea

- Cololejeunea caihuaella But & P.C.Wu
- Cololejeunea cairnsiana Pócs
- Cololejeunea calcarata E.W.Jones
- Cololejeunea calcarea (Lib.) Steph.
- Cololejeunea caledonica Gottsche
- Cololejeunea cambodiana Tixier
- Cololejeunea camillii (Lehm.) A.Evans
- Cololejeunea campanulata Benedix
- Cololejeunea camusii Tixier
- Cololejeunea capuronii Tixier
- Cololejeunea cardiocarpa (Mont.) A.Evans
- Cololejeunea cardiocarpioides Tixier
- Cololejeunea casuarinae (Stephani) R.M.Schust.
- Cololejeunea ceatocarpa (Ångstr.) Steph.
- Cololejeunea ceratilobula (P.C.Chen) R.M.Schust.
- Cololejeunea ceylanica Onr.
- Cololejeunea chamlongiana Tixier
- Cololejeunea chenii Tixier
- Cololejeunea chinii Tixier
- Cololejeunea chittagongensis Tixier
- Cololejeunea chrysanthemi Tixier
- Cololejeunea chuahiana Pócs
- Cololejeunea ciliata Pócs
- Cololejeunea ciliatilobula (Schiffner) Schiffner
- Cololejeunea cingens (Herzog) Bernecker & Pócs
- Cololejeunea clavatopapillata Steph.
- Cololejeunea cocoscola Tixier
- Cololejeunea comptonii (Pearson) H.A.Mill.
- Cololejeunea conchaefolia (Gottsche) Gradst.
- Cololejeunea conchifolia (Gottsche) Gradst.
- Cololejeunea contractiloba A.Evans
- Cololejeunea cookei A.Evans
- Cololejeunea cordiflora Steph.
- Cololejeunea cordifolia (Stephani) R.M.Schust.
- Cololejeunea cornuta E.W.Jones
- Cololejeunea cornutissima (R.M.Schust.) Stotler & Crand.-Stotl.
- Cololejeunea costaricensis (Bern.-Lück.) Bernecker & Pócs
- Cololejeunea crassipapillata Tixier
- Cololejeunea crateris Pócs
- Cololejeunea cremersii Tixier
- Cololejeunea crenata A.Evans) Pócs
- Cololejeunea crenulata (Pearson) H.A.Mill.
- Cololejeunea cristata (Steph.) R.M.Schust.
- Cololejeunea cubensis Pócs
- Cololejeunea cucullifolia (Herzog) E.A.Hodgs.
- Cololejeunea cuneata (Lehm. & Lindenb.) Herzog
- Cololejeunea cuneifolia Steph.

== D ==
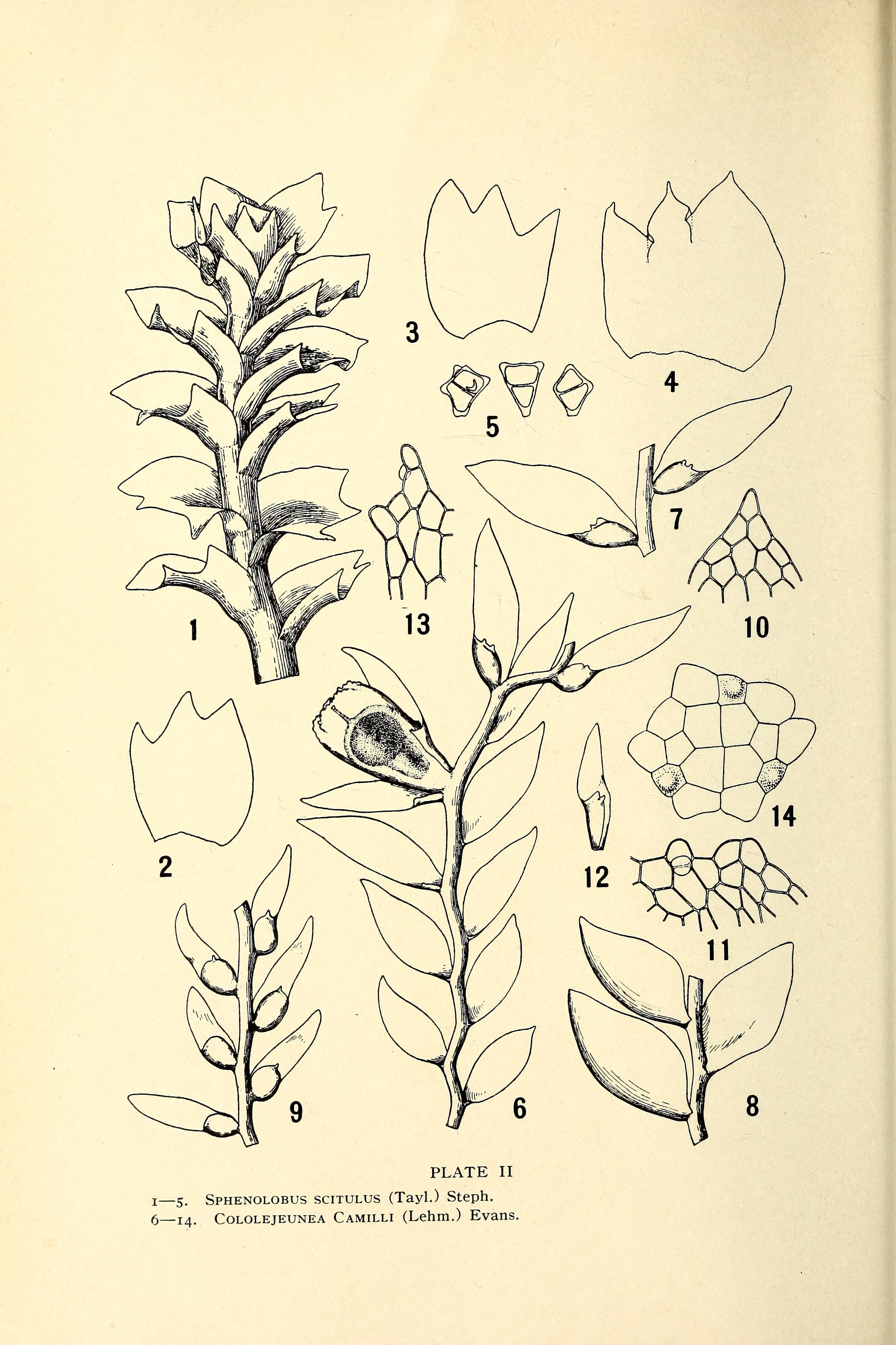
Illustrations 6—14 show Cololejeunea camillii (from 1912)

- Cololejeunea dadeuniana Tixier
- Cololejeunea dalatensis Tixier
- Cololejeunea dankiaensis Tixier
- Cololejeunea dauphinii R.L.Zhu
- Cololejeunea decemplicata (Steph.) Tixier
- Cololejeunea decliviloba Steph.
- Cololejeunea dentata (E.W.Jones) R.M.Schust.
- Cololejeunea denticulate (Horik.) S.Hatt, 1944
- Cololejeunea dentifolia Udar & G.Srivast.
- Cololejeunea dentilobula (Steph.) R.M.Schust.
- Cololejeunea deroinii Tixier
- Cololejeunea desciscens Steph.
- Cololejeunea deslooveri Vanden Berghen
- Cololejeunea dianae M.Wigginton
- Cololejeunea diaphana A.Evans
- Cololejeunea dilatata (Steph.) Mizut.
- Cololejeunea dinghuiana R.L.Zhu & Y.F.Wang
- Cololejeunea diplasiolejeunoides Tixier
- Cololejeunea disciflora Tixier
- Cololejeunea dissita E.W.Jones
- Cololejeunea distalopapillata (E.W.Jones) R.M.Schust.
- Cololejeunea dolichodonta Tixier
- Cololejeunea dolichostyla (Herzog) Benedix ex J.J.Engel & B.C.Tan
- Cololejeunea dozyana (Sande Lac.) Schiffn.
- Cololejeunea drepanolejeuneoides (Horik.) R.M.Schust.
- Cololejeunea duvignaudii E.W.Jones
- Cololejeunea dzumacensis Tixier
- Cololejeunea dzurnacensis Tixier

== E ==
- Cololejeunea ecuadoriensis Pócs
- Cololejeunea effusa (Mitt.) Steph.
- Cololejeunea elegans Steph.
- Cololejeunea elephantorum Tixier
- Cololejeunea elizabethae Meagher & Pócs
- Cololejeunea ellipsoidea R.M.Schust.
- Cololejeunea ensifera Tixier
- Cololejeunea ensifolia (Spruce) Herzog
- Cololejeunea ephemeroides (R.M.Schust.) Stotler & Crand.-Stot.
- Cololejeunea epiphylla G.Asthana & A.Shukla
- Cololejeunea equialbi Tixier
- Cololejeunea erostrata (Herzog) Bernecker & Pócs
- Cololejeunea estipulata (Gottsche ex Stephani) Tixier
- Cololejeunea eustacei Pócs
- Cololejeunea evansii Tixier

== F ==
- Cololejeunea fadenii Pocs
- Cololejeunea falcata (Horik.) Benedix
- Cololejeunea falcatoides Benedix
- Cololejeunea falcidentata R.M.Schust.
- Cololejeunea fefeana Tixier
- Cololejeunea fernandeziana Solari
- Cololejeunea filicis (Herzog) Piippo
- Cololejeunea filidens Benedix
- Cololejeunea fischeri Tixier
- Cololejeunea fissilobula Herzog
- Cololejeunea flavicans (Steph.) Mizut.
- Cololejeunea flavida P.C.Wu & J.S.Lou
- Cololejeunea flavovittata Pócs
- Cololejeunea floccosa (Lehm. & Lindenb.) Schiffn.
- Cololejeunea florencei Tixier
- Cololejeunea foliicola S.C.Srivast. & G.Srivast.
- Cololejeunea formosana Mizut.
- Cololejeunea frahmii Tixier
- Cololejeunea fredericii Onr.
- Cololejeunea fructumarginata Tixier
- Cololejeunea frustulum Gottsche ex Benedix
- Cololejeunea furcilobulata (Berrie & E.W.Jones) R.M.Schust.
- Cololejeunea fusca (Steph.) Mizut.

== G ==
- Cololejeunea geissleriana Tixier
- Cololejeunea gemmifera (P.C.Chen) R.M.Schust.
- Cololejeunea georgiana Tixier
- Cololejeunea goebelii (Gottsche ex K.I.Goebel) Schiffner
- Cololejeunea gottschei (Steph.) Pandé, K.P.Srivast. & Ahmad
- Cololejeunea gottschei (Stephani) Mizut.
- Cololejeunea gracilis (Jovet-Ast) Pócs
- Cololejeunea gradsteinii M.J.Lai & R.L.Zhu
- Cololejeunea gresicola Tixier
- Cololejeunea grolleana Pócs
- Cololejeunea grossepapillosa (Horik.) N.Kitag.
- Cololejeunea grossestyla M.Wigginton
- Cololejeunea grossidens (Stephani) E.W.Jones
- Cololejeunea grushvitzkiana Pócs
- Cololejeunea guadeloupensis Tixier
- Cololejeunea guadelupensis Tixier
- Cololejeunea gynophthalma Benedix

== H ==
- Cololejeunea hainanensis R.L.Zhu
- Cololejeunea hamata Steph.
- Cololejeunea handelii (Herzog) S.Hatt.
- Cololejeunea harrisii Pócs
- Cololejeunea haskarliana (Lehm.) Schiffn.
- Cololejeunea hasskarliana (Lehm. & Lindenb.) Stephani
- Cololejeunea hattoriana Mizut. & Pócs
- Cololejeunea hebridensis Tixier
- Cololejeunea heinarii Pócs
- Cololejeunea herzogii K.I.Goebel
- Cololejeunea heterolobula Tixier
- Cololejeunea hildebrandii (Austin) Steph.
- Cololejeunea himalayensis (Pandé & Misra) R.M.Schust.
- Cololejeunea hinidumae Onr.
- Cololejeunea hirta (Stephani) S.Hatt.
- Cololejeunea hispidissima Pandé
- Cololejeunea hoabinhiana Tixier
- Cololejeunea hodgsoniae (Herzog) E.A.Hodgs.
- Cololejeunea hoeana Tixier
- Cololejeunea horikawana (S.Hatt.) Mizut.
- Cololejeunea huerlimannii Tixier
- Cololejeunea hungii Tixier
- Cololejeunea hyalina G.Asthana & S.C.Srivast.
- Cololejeunea hyalinomarginata (Nees & Mont.) Grolle

== I ==
- Cololejeunea indica Pandé & R.N.Misra
- Cololejeunea indosinica Tixier
- Cololejeunea inflata Steph.
- Cololejeunea inflectens (Mitt.) Benedix
- Cololejeunea inflexifolia R.M.Schust.
- Cololejeunea inoueana Mizut.
- Cololejeunea inuena (Stephani) S.Hatt.
- Cololejeunea iradieri M.Infante & Heras
- Cololejeunea irianensis Tixier
- Cololejeunea iwatsukiana (Pócs) Pócs

== J ==
- Cololejeunea jamesii (Austin) M.E.Reiner & Pócs
- Cololejeunea japonica (Schiffn.) Mizut.
- Cololejeunea javanica (Stephani) Mizut.
- Cololejeunea jelinekii Stephani
- Cololejeunea johannis-winkleri (Herzog) R.L.Zhu
- Cololejeunea jonesii Pócs
- Cololejeunea jovetastiae Tixier
- Cololejeunea jovetastiana (Pócs) Pócs

== K ==
- Cololejeunea kadamae Kaminura
- Cololejeunea kahuziensis Tixier
- Cololejeunea kamchayana Tixier
- Cololejeunea kapingaensis H.A.Mill.
- Cololejeunea karnatakensis G.Asthana & S.C.Srivast.
- Cololejeunea karstenii (Stephani) Benedix
- Cololejeunea kashyapii Udar & G.Srivast.
- Cololejeunea kegelii Steph.
- Cololejeunea khanii Tixier
- Cololejeunea khawanglungensis Sushil K.Singh
- Cololejeunea khiavensis Tixier
- Cololejeunea kinabalensis Mizut.
- Cololejeunea kiriromensis Tixier
- Cololejeunea kodamae Kamim.
- Cololejeunea kohkongensis Tixier
- Cololejeunea kolombangarae Pócs
- Cololejeunea konratii Pócs
- Cololejeunea koponenii (Pócs) Pócs
- Cololejeunea koratensis Tixier
- Cololejeunea kuciana Pócs & Schäf.-Verw.
- Cololejeunea kulenensis Tixier

== L ==
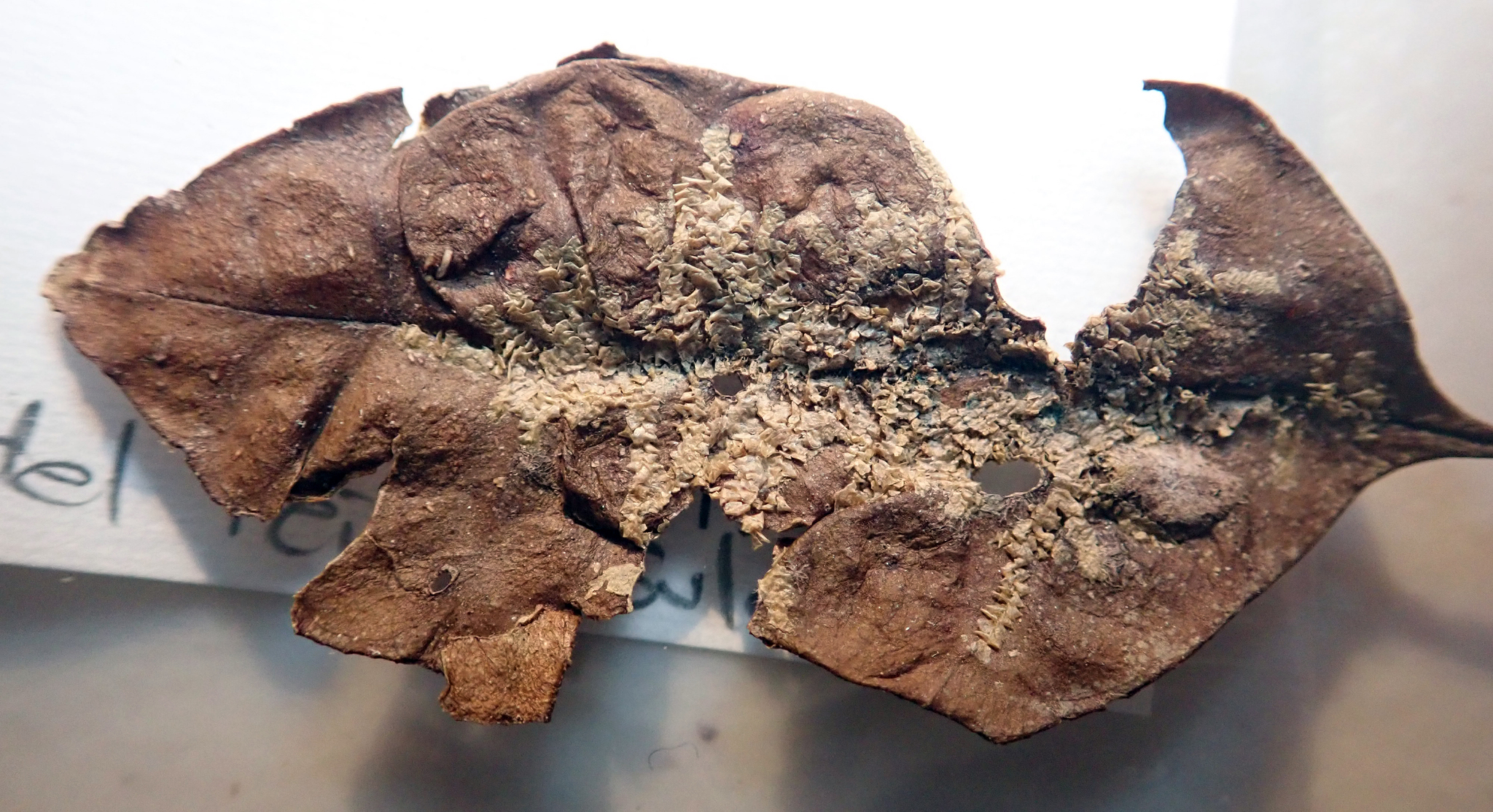
Cololejeunea laevigata

- Cololejeunea lacinulata Benedix
- Cololejeunea laevigata (Mitt.) R.M.Schust.
- Cololejeunea laii J.D.Yang & S.H.Lin
- Cololejeunea lanceolata E.W.Jones
- Cololejeunea lanciloba Steph.
- Cololejeunea latilobula (Herzog) Tixier
- Cololejeunea latistyla R.L.Zhu
- Cololejeunea leloutrei (E.W.Jones) R.M.Schust.
- Cololejeunea lemuriana Tixier
- Cololejeunea leonardii Vanden Berghen
- Cololejeunea leonidens Benedix
- Cololejeunea leptolejeuneoides (Schiffner) R.M.Schust.
- Cololejeunea lhotzkiana (Hampe) R.M.Schust.
- Cololejeunea lichenyae R.D.Porley, N.G.Hodgetts & M.Wigginton
- Cololejeunea linopteroides H.Rob.
- Cololejeunea lisowskii (Pócs) Pócs
- Cololejeunea littoralis Tixier
- Cololejeunea lobulilineata Tixier
- Cololejeunea lobulolineata Tixier
- Cololejeunea longiana Grolle & Mizut.
- Cololejeunea longifolia (Mitt.) Benedix ex Mizut.
- Cololejeunea longilobula (Horik.) R.M.Schust.
- Cololejeunea longistylis A.Evans

== M ==
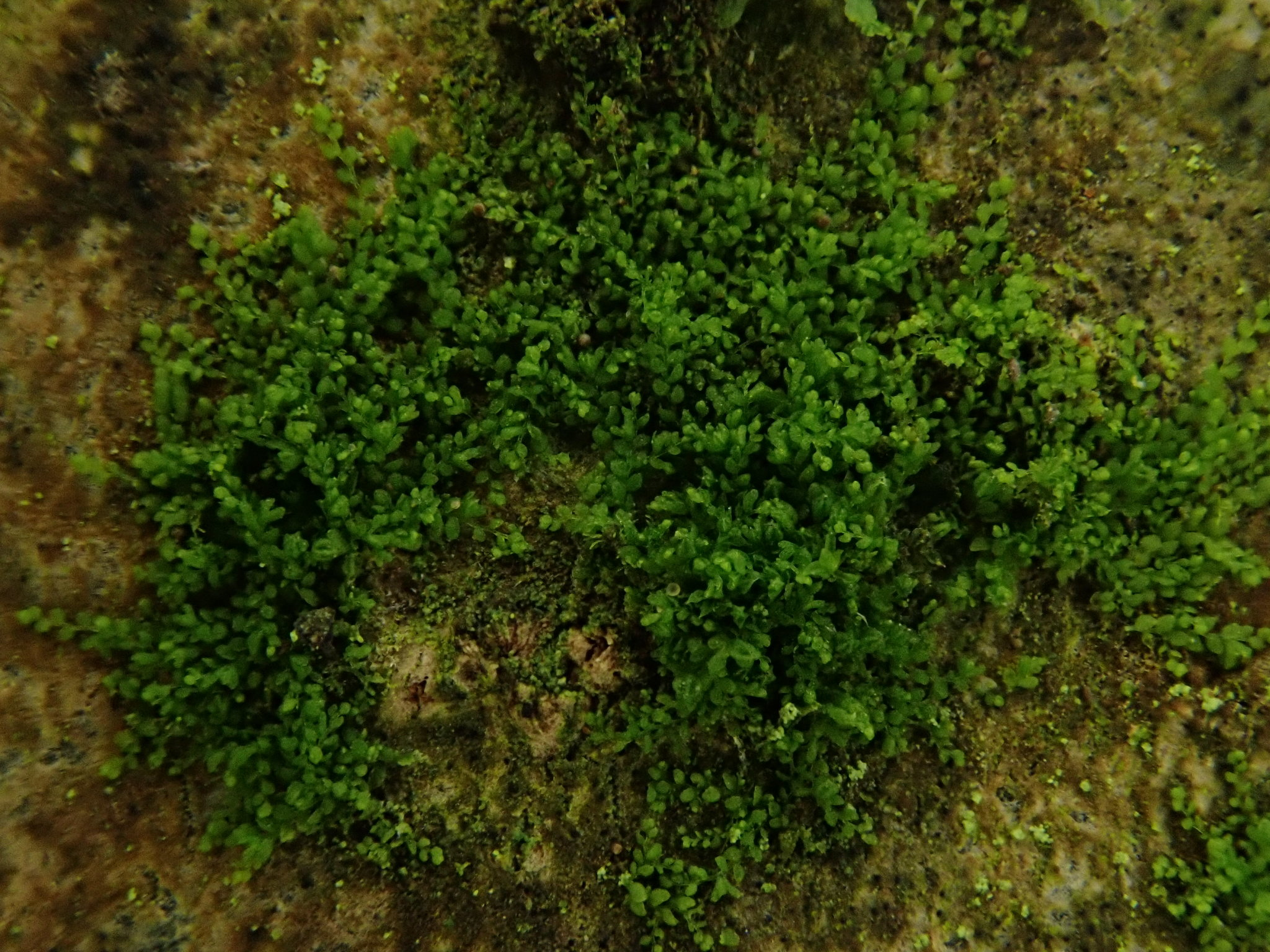
Cololejeunea minutissima (Minute Pouncewort)

- Cololejeunea mackeeana Tixier
- Cololejeunea macounii (Spruce) A.Evans
- Cololejeunea madeirensis Schiffn.
- Cololejeunea madothecoides (Steph.) Benedix
- Cololejeunea magillii Pócs
- Cololejeunea magna (Tixier) M.Infante & Heras
- Cololejeunea magnifica Pócs
- Cololejeunea magnilobula (Horik.) S.Hatt.
- Cololejeunea magnipapillosa (Kamim.) P.C.Chen & P.C.Wu
- Cololejeunea magnistyla (Horik.) Mizut.
- Cololejeunea malaccensis Tixier
- Cololejeunea malanjae Steph.
- Cololejeunea malayana Tixier
- Cololejeunea mamillata (Ångstr.) E.A.Hodgs.
- Cololejeunea manilalia Manju, Chandini & K.P.Rajesh
- Cololejeunea manlinensis Tixier
- Cololejeunea maquilingensis Tixier
- Cololejeunea marginata (Lehm. & Lindenb.) Pearson
- Cololejeunea maritima Tixier
- Cololejeunea metzgeriopsis (K.I.Goebel) Gradst., R.Wilson, Ilk.-Borg. & Heinrichs
- Cololejeunea micrandroecia (Spruce) M.Menzel
- Cololejeunea micro-androecia (Spruce) Schiffner ex Mizut.
- Cololejeunea microlejeuneoides (Horik.) S.Hatt.
- Cololejeunea micronesica H.A.Mill. & Bonner
- Cololejeunea microscopica (Taylor) Schiffn.
- Cololejeunea minuscula Pócs
- Cololejeunea minutilobula Herzog
- Cololejeunea mizutaniana Udar & G.Srivast.
- Cololejeunea mizutanii R.M.Schust. & Inoue
- Cololejeunea mocambiquensis S.W.Arnell
- Cololejeunea mooreaensis Tixier
- Cololejeunea moralesiae (Bern.-Lück.) Bernecker & Pócs
- Cololejeunea moramangae Tixier
- Cololejeunea morobensis (Pócs) Pócs
- Cololejeunea mouensis (Tixier) H.A.Mill.
- Cololejeunea murlenensis Sushil K.Singh
- Cololejeunea mutabilis Benedix
- Cololejeunea myriantha (Herzog) S.W.Arnell

== N ==
- Cololejeunea nakaii (Horik.) H.A.Mill.
- Cololejeunea nakajimae S.Hatt.
- Cololejeunea nanhutashanensis J.D.Yang & S.H.Lin
- Cololejeunea nigerica (E.W.Jones) R.M.Schust.
- Cololejeunea nilgiriensis G.Asthana & S.C.Srivast.
- Cololejeunea ninguana Tixier
- Cololejeunea ninhbinhiana Tixier
- Cololejeunea nipponica (Horik.) S.Hatt.
- Cololejeunea norfolkiensis Stephani
- Cololejeunea norrisii (Pócs) Pócs
- Cololejeunea nosykombae András Szabó & Pócs
- Cololejeunea nymanii (Stephani) Benedix

== O ==
- Cololejeunea obcordata (Austin) A.Evans
- Cololejeunea obliqua (Nees & Mont.) Schiffn.
- Cololejeunea oblongiperianthia (P.C.Wu & J.S.Lou) Piippo
- Cololejeunea obtusifolia (E.W.Jones) Tixier
- Cololejeunea occidentalis (E.W.Jones) Vanden Berghen
- Cololejeunea ocellata (Horik.) Benedix
- Cololejeunea ocelloides (Horik.) Mizut.
- Cololejeunea oleana Sim
- Cololejeunea olivaceoviridis S.W.Arnell
- Cololejeunea ombrophila Tixier
- Cololejeunea onraedtii Tixier
- Cololejeunea orbiculata (Herzog) S.Hatt.
- Cololejeunea ornata A.Evans
- Cololejeunea oshimensis (Horik.) Benedix
- Cololejeunea ovalifolia A.Evans

== P ==
- Cololejeunea pacifica Pócs
- Cololejeunea panamensis G.Dauphin & Pócs
- Cololejeunea panchoana Tixier
- Cololejeunea pandei Udar & G.Srivast.
- Cololejeunea paniensis (Tixier) Grolle
- Cololejeunea papilliloba (Steph.) Steph.
- Cololejeunea papillosa (K.I.Goebel) Mizut.
- Cololejeunea papillosa Bernecker & Pócs
- Cololejeunea papuliflora Steph.
- Cololejeunea papulosa R.M.Schust.
- Cololejeunea parallelifolia R.M.Schust.
- Cololejeunea paroica Mizut.
- Cololejeunea parva Vanden Berghen
- Cololejeunea paucifolia (Spruce) Bernecker & Pócs
- Cololejeunea paucimarginata Tixier
- Cololejeunea peculiaris (Herzog) Benedix
- Cololejeunea pentagona (Mitt.) Steph.
- Cololejeunea peponiformis Mizut.
- Cololejeunea peraffinis (Schiffn.) Schiffn.
- Cololejeunea perakensis Tixier
- Cololejeunea plagiochiliana Tixier
- Cololejeunea plagiophylla Benedix
- Cololejeunea planiflora Benedix
- Cololejeunea planifolia (A.Evans) R.M.Schust.
- Cololejeunea planissima (Mitt.) Abeyw.
- Cololejeunea planiuscula Tixier
- Cololejeunea platyneura (Spruce) A.Evans
- Cololejeunea pluridentata P.C.Wu & J.S.Lou
- Cololejeunea pluripunctata Benedix
- Cololejeunea pocsii Tixier
- Cololejeunea polillensis (Stephani) Mizut.
- Cololejeunea polisiana Tixier
- Cololejeunea polyantha (Stephani) H.A.Mill.
- Cololejeunea praerupterum Tixier
- Cololejeunea pretiosa Benedix
- Cololejeunea producta (Mitt.) S.Hatt.
- Cololejeunea pseudo-obliqua Tixier
- Cololejeunea pseudocristallina P.C.Chen & P.C.Wu
- Cololejeunea pseudocuspidata Tixier
- Cololejeunea pseudofloccosa (Horik.) Benedix
- Cololejeunea pseudolatilobula (P.C.Chen & P.C.Wu) But & Gao Cai-hua
- Cololejeunea pseudoplagiophylla P.C.Wu & J.S.Lou
- Cololejeunea pseudopusilla Tixier
- Cololejeunea pseudoschmidtii Tixier
- Cololejeunea pseudoserrata Tixier
- Cololejeunea pseudostephanii Tixier
- Cololejeunea pseudostipulata Schiffn.
- Cololejeunea pterocolea Herzog
- Cololejeunea pteroporum Tixier
- Cololejeunea pulchella (Mitt.) R.M.Schust.
- Cololejeunea punctata (Gottsche) Pearson
- Cololejeunea pusilla Steph.
- Cololejeunea pustulosa Jovet-Ast

== Q ==
- Cololejeunea quadridentata (S.Hatt.) Grolle

== R ==
- Cololejeunea raduliloba Steph.
- Cololejeunea ramromensis Pócs
- Cololejeunea reinecheana Stephani
- Cololejeunea reineckeana Steph.
- Cololejeunea renneri Pócs
- Cololejeunea retusula (Mitt.) H.A.Mill.
- Cololejeunea rosellata Mizut.
- Cololejeunea rossettiana (C.Massal.) Schiffn.
- Cololejeunea rotundilobula (P.C.Wu & P.J.Lin) Piippo
- Cololejeunea runssorensis (Steph.) Pócs
- Cololejeunea rupicola (Stephani) S.Hatt.

== S ==
- Cololejeunea salgadoi Onr.
- Cololejeunea saltuum Tixier
- Cololejeunea sambiroana Tixier
- Cololejeunea sanctae-helenae M.Wigginton
- Cololejeunea saroltae Pócs
- Cololejeunea savesiana (Stephani) R.M.Schust.
- Cololejeunea schaeferi Grolle
- Cololejeunea schmidtii Steph.
- Cololejeunea schusteri Pócs
- Cololejeunea schwabei Herzog
- Cololejeunea selaginellicola Tixier
- Cololejeunea selangorensis Tixier
- Cololejeunea serrata (Steph.) Benedix
- Cololejeunea serrulata Steph.
- Cololejeunea setiloba A.Evans
- Cololejeunea setosa Mizut.
- Cololejeunea sharpii Mizut.
- Cololejeunea shibatae (S.Hatt.) R.M.Schust.
- Cololejeunea shibiensis Mizut.
- Cololejeunea shikokiana (Horik.) S.Hatt.
- Cololejeunea shimizui N.Kitag.
- Cololejeunea siamensis (Stephani) Mizut.
- Cololejeunea siangensis G.Asthana & S.C.Srivast.
- Cololejeunea sicaefolia (Gottsche) Pócs & Bernecker
- Cololejeunea sicifolia (Steph. ex A.Evans) Pócs & Bernecker
- Cololejeunea sigmoidea Jovet-Ast & Tixier
- Cololejeunea sintenisii (Steph.) Pócs
- Cololejeunea sinuosa Onr.
- Cololejeunea skottsbergii Herzog
- Cololejeunea smitinandii Tixier
- Cololejeunea societatis Tixier
- Cololejeunea sophiana Tixier
- Cololejeunea spathulata Jovet-Ast
- Cololejeunea spathulifolia (Steph.) H.A.Mill.
- Cololejeunea sphaerocarpa Tixier
- Cololejeunea sphaerodonta Mizut.
- Cololejeunea spinosa (Horik.) Pandé & R.N.Misra
- Cololejeunea spruceana Tixier
- Cololejeunea standleyi Herzog
- Cololejeunea stellaris Pócs
- Cololejeunea stenophylla Herzog
- Cololejeunea stephanii Schiffn. ex Benedix
- Cololejeunea stoniana Tixier
- Cololejeunea stotleriana Gradst., Ilk.-Borg. & Vanderp.
- Cololejeunea streimannii Pócs
- Cololejeunea stylilobula Tixier
- Cololejeunea stylosa Steph.
- Cololejeunea subalpina Pócs
- Cololejeunea subcardiocarpa Tixier
- Cololejeunea subciliata (Mitt.) R.M.Schust.
- Cololejeunea subcristata A.Evans
- Cololejeunea subfloccosa Mizut.
- Cololejeunea subinflata Tixier
- Cololejeunea subkodamae Mizut.
- Cololejeunea sublatistyla Jian Wang bis & R.L.Zhu
- Cololejeunea submarginata Tixier
- Cololejeunea subminutilobula Mizut.
- Cololejeunea subocelloides Mizut.
- Cololejeunea subscariosa (Spruce) Pócs
- Cololejeunea subsphaeroidea (R.M.Schust.) Pócs
- Cololejeunea subtriapiculata Tixier
- Cololejeunea succinea Tixier
- Cololejeunea surinamensis Tixier

== T ==
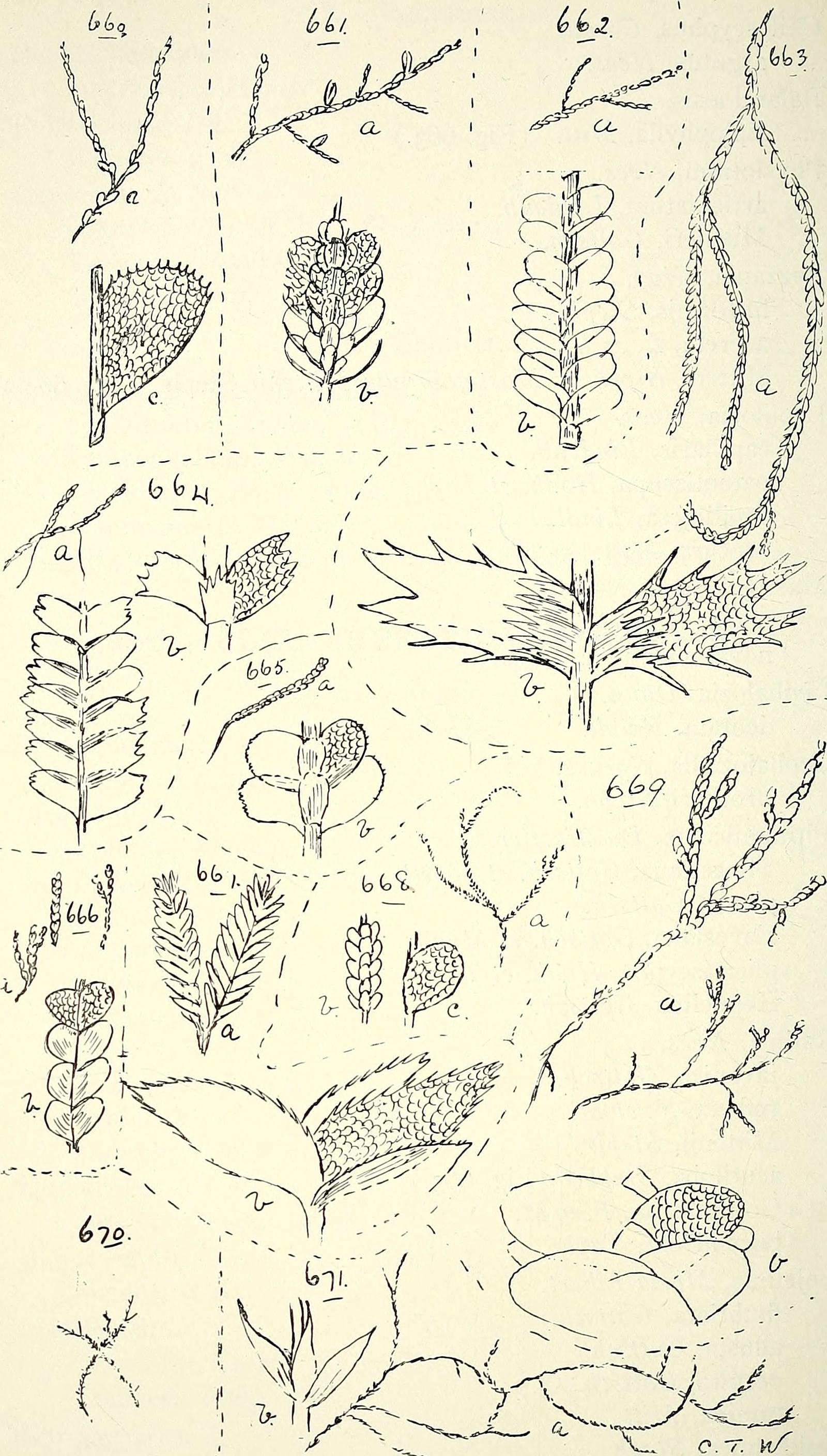
Illustration number 675 shows Cololejeunea trichomanis (1909)

- Cololejeunea tahitensis Tixier
- Cololejeunea takamakae Tixier
- Cololejeunea tamasii Schäf.-Verw.
- Cololejeunea tamatavensis Tixier
- Cololejeunea tamdaoensis Tixier
- Cololejeunea tanneri Pócs
- Cololejeunea tanzaniae Pócs
- Cololejeunea taprobanea Tixier
- Cololejeunea taurifolia Inoue & H.A.Mill.
- Cololejeunea tenella Benedix
- Cololejeunea tenuiparietata Tixier
- Cololejeunea teotonii (V.Allorge & Jovet-Ast) Grolle
- Cololejeunea teurnoumensis Tixier
- Cololejeunea thailandense Tixier
- Cololejeunea thailandensis Tixier
- Cololejeunea thiersiae (Pócs) Pócs
- Cololejeunea thiersiana Tixier
- Cololejeunea timoi Pócs
- Cololejeunea tixieri Onr.
- Cololejeunea tixieriana M.Dey, D.Singh & D.K.Singh
- Cololejeunea tonkinensis Stephani
- Cololejeunea touwii Pócs
- Cololejeunea tranninhiana Tixier
- Cololejeunea triapiculata (Herzog) Tixier
- Cololejeunea tribracteata Tixier
- Cololejeunea trichomanis (Gottsche) Besch.
- Cololejeunea tridentata Tixier
- Cololejeunea trinitensis Tixier
- Cololejeunea tuiwawana Pócs
- Cololejeunea tuksapiana Tixier
- Cololejeunea turbinifera (Spruce) León-Yánez, Gradst., Wegner & Caroline

== U ==
- Cololejeunea uchimae Amakawa
- Cololejeunea udarii G.Asthana & S.C.Srivast.

== V ==
- Cololejeunea variifolia (Mitt.) Steph.
- Cololejeunea veillonii Tixier
- Cololejeunea verdoornii (S.Hatt.) S.Hatt.
- Cololejeunea verrucosa Steph.
- Cololejeunea verwimpii Tixier
- Cololejeunea vesicaria (Sande Lac.) Schiffn.
- Cololejeunea vidaliana Tixier
- Cololejeunea vietnamensis Tixier
- Cololejeunea virotana Tixier
- Cololejeunea vitalana Tixier
- Cololejeunea vitaliana Tixier
- Cololejeunea vitiensis (E.O.Campb.) H.A.Mill.
- Cololejeunea vulcania Tixier

== W ==
- Cololejeunea wattsiana (Stephani) R.M.Schust.
- Cololejeunea wightii Steph.
- Cololejeunea winkleri (M.I.Morales & A.Lücking) Pócs

== X ==
- Cololejeunea xaveri (Stephani) E.W.Jones

== Y ==
- Cololejeunea yakusimensis (S.Hatt.) Mizut.
- Cololejeunea yamanakana Kamim.
- Cololejeunea yanoanae Tixier
- Cololejeunea yelitzae Pócs & Bernecker
- Cololejeunea yipii R.L.Zhu
- Cololejeunea yoshinagana (S.Hatt.) Mizut.
- Cololejeunea yulensis (Stephani) Benedix

== Z ==
- Cololejeunea zangii R.L.Zhu & M.L.So
- Cololejeunea zantenorum Pócs
- Cololejeunea zenkeri (Steph.) E.W.Jones
