= Hällingsåfallet =

Nature reserve in Jämtland, Sweden

Hällingsåfallet Nature Reserve
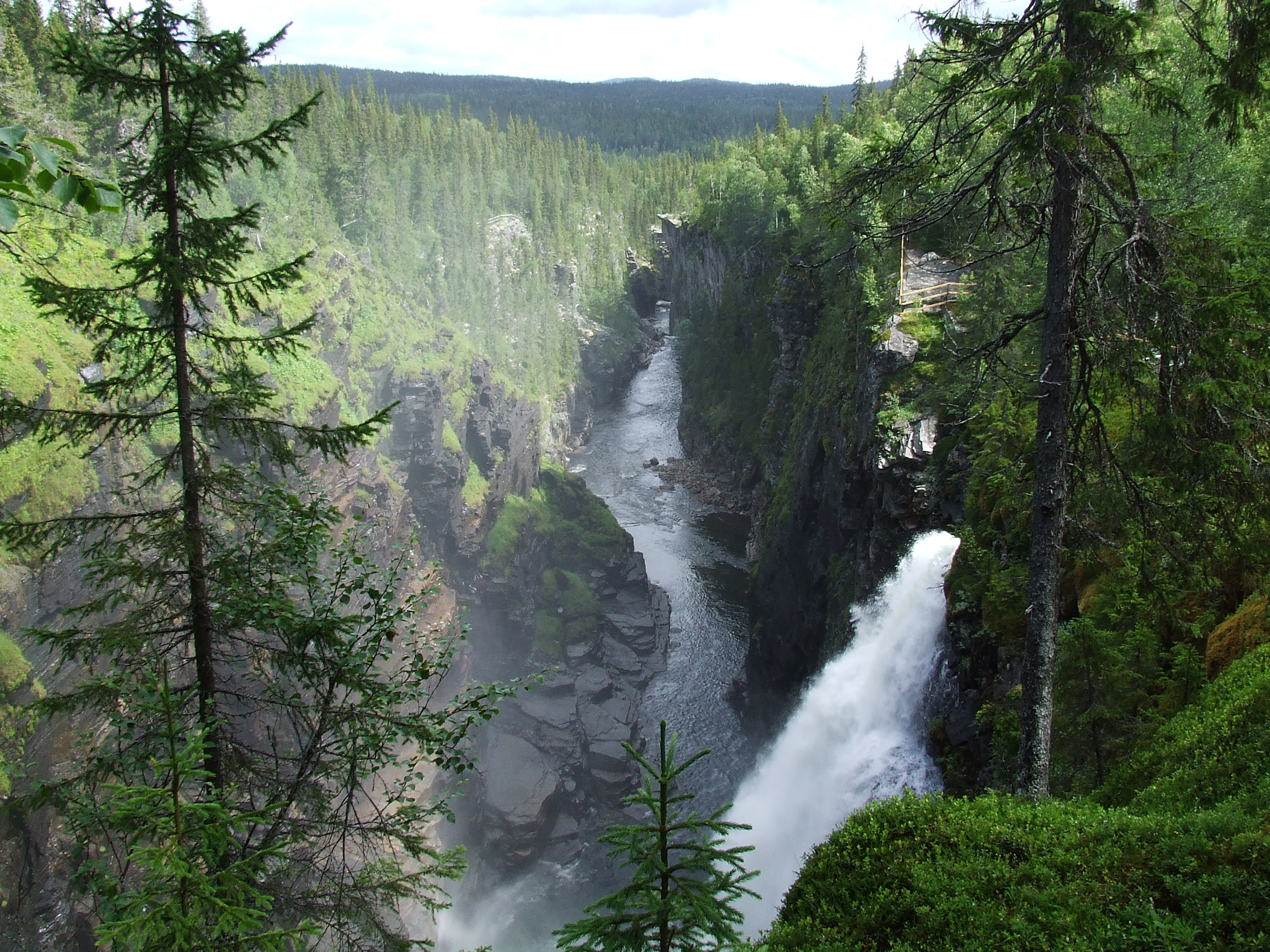

- Location within Jämtland
- Location: Sweden
- Nearest city: Östersund
- Coordinates: 64°20′56″N 14°22′59″E
- Area: 16 ha (40 acres)
- Established: 1971

Hällingsåfallet is a waterfall and a nature reserve in Jämtland County in Sweden. It is part of the European Union-wide Natura 2000 network.

== Geography ==
The nature reserve is centred on Hällingsåfallet waterfall and the river canyon into which it discharges. The nature reserve is located at an altitude of around 330 m (1,080 ft) to 400 m (1,300 ft) above the sea level, and the waterfall itself is 43 m (141 ft) high. The canyon into which it falls is circa 800 m (2,600 ft) long, making it the longest in Sweden, and between 15 m (49 ft) and 60 m (200 ft) wide. The canyon was probably not formed by the current stream running there, but rather during the last ice age, when the melting ice eroded what was already a crack in the bedrock here. However, it cannot be excluded that the canyon is even older.

== Flora ==
The moisture evaporating from the stream as it cascades through the fall has generated an unusual, very wet environment which is a good habitat for several types of Cryptogamae. Because of the extensive use of hydropower in Sweden, this kind of environment is today very unusual in the country. The purpose of the nature reserve is to protect this biotope. It contains several species of moss and lichen deemed to be in need of protection within Sweden, including Cavernularia hultenii, Cololejeunea calcarea, Fuscopannaria confusa and Lobaria hallii (the latter being known from only eight locales in Sweden, including Hällingsåfallet). It also includes threatened fungi such as Pseudographis pinicola and Neolecta vitellina.

The forest surrounding the waterfall and the canyon (and which is also under protection) is a circa 150-year-old mixed coniferous forest dominated by spruce and with the occasional even older tree. Apart from the aforementioned great variety of fungi, moss and lichen, the moist forest also contain the orchid species Dactylorhiza maculata and other unusual plants such as northern wolfsbane, Alpine snow-thistle and velvetbells. The bird-life of the area has also been described as "interesting"; species found here are grey wagtail, white-throated dipper, merlin and rough-legged buzzard.

For the convenience of visitors, a 2 km (1.2 miles) long path has been created from a nearby parking lot, and amenities such as outhouses and a simple shelter have been built. The path and one outhouse is accessible also for the disabled.

== See also ==
- List of waterfalls
