= Strömsund Municipality =

Strömsund Municipality Strömsunds kommun
- Municipality
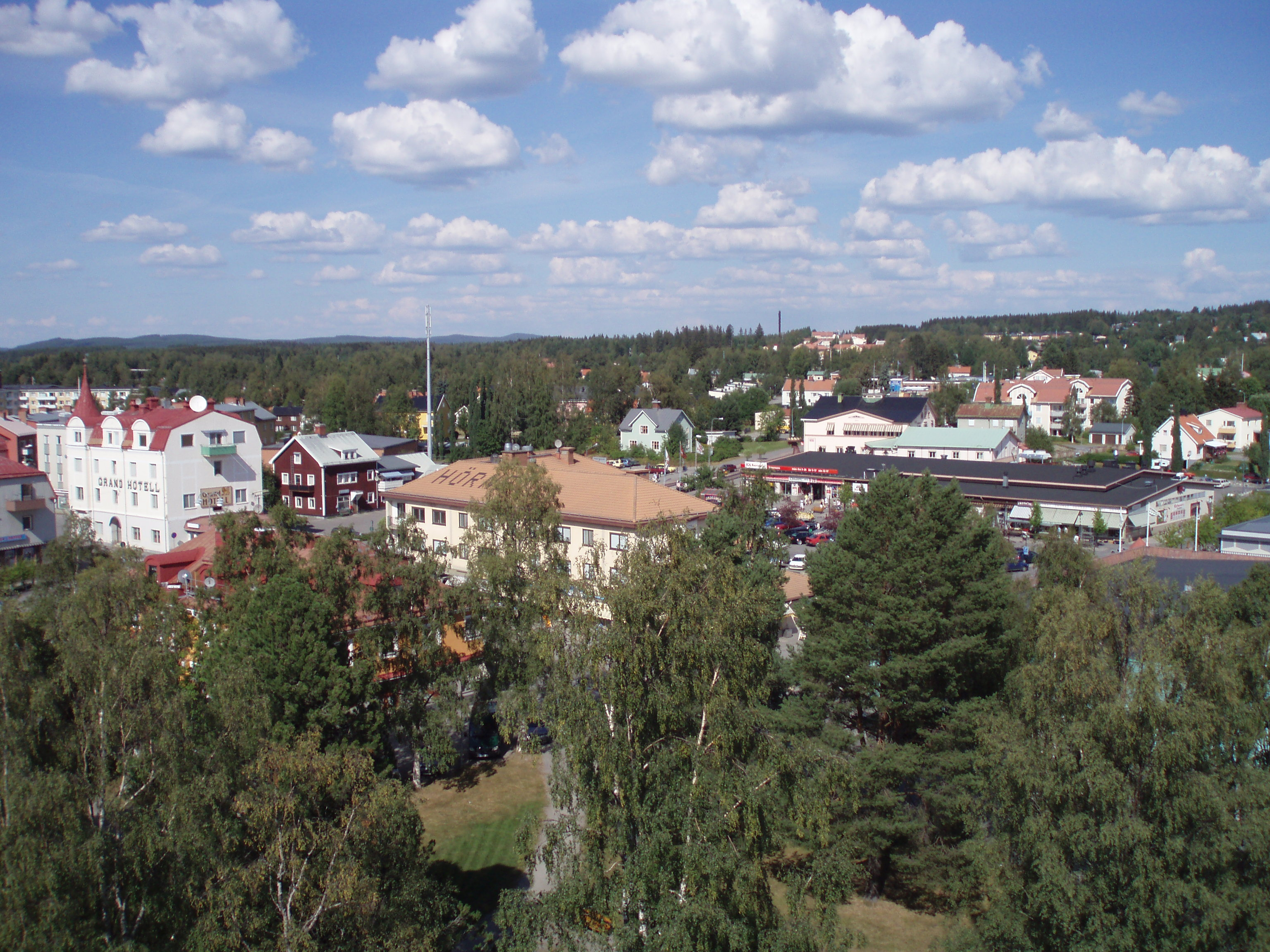

- Coat of arms

- Coordinates: 63°51′N 15°35′E
- Country: Sweden
- County: Jämtland County
- Seat: Strömsund

Area
  - Total: 11,780.57 km^{2} (4,548.50 sq mi)
  - Land: 10,465.08 km^{2} (4,040.59 sq mi)
  - Water: 1,315.49 km^{2} (507.91 sq mi)
- Area as of 1 January 2014.

Population (30 June 2025)
  - Total: 10,965
  - Density: 1.0478/km^{2} (2.7137/sq mi)
- Time zone: UTC+1 (CET)
  - Summer (DST): UTC+2 (CEST)
- ISO 3166 code: SE
- Province: Jämtland and Ångermanland
- Municipal code: 2313
- Website: www.stromsund.se

Strömsund Municipality (Swedish: Strömsunds kommun; Southern Sami: Straejmien tjïelte) is a municipality in Jämtland County in northern Sweden. Its seat is located in Strömsund.

The nearest larger city is Östersund, the provincial capital of Jämtland, which is located approximately 100 km to the south.

== History ==
Strömsund Municipality was formed in 1974 through the amalgamation of the former municipalities of Fjällsjö, Frostviken, Hammerdal and Ström. The most populous locality in the area, Strömsund, was chosen as administrative centre, and it also gave its name to the new entity.

== Geography ==
With an area of roughly 12,000 km^{2} (4,600 sq mi), it is the sixth largest in Sweden, and one of the most sparsely populated. The town Strömsund has a municipal population of about 3,500 and is located on the slopes of Ströms vattudal, the lake whose waters flow through the town and which can be seen being spanned by the Strömsund Bridge on the municipal coat of arms. Among locals, the town itself is usually referred to as Ström or Flata (a reference to the flack slope on which the central parts of the town is built).

=== Localities ===
There are seven localities (or urban areas) in Strömsund Municipality:

#	Locality	Population	Notes
1	**Strömsund**	3,516	
2	Hammerdal	996	
3	Hoting	749	Was prior to 1974 part of Västernorrland and is part of the Ångermanland frontier region.
4	Backe	625	Was prior to 1974 part of Västernorrland and is part of the Ångermanland frontier region.
5	Gäddede	456	
6	Rossön	400	Was prior to 1974 part of Västernorrland and is part of the Ångermanland frontier region.
7	Näsviken	221	

The municipal seat in bold

== Demographics ==
This is a demographic table based on Strömsund Municipality's electoral districts in the 2022 Swedish general election sourced from SVT's election platform, in turn taken from SCB official statistics.

In total there were 11,458 residents, including 8,831 Swedish citizens of voting age. 52.2% voted for the left coalition and 46.6% for the right coalition. Indicators are in percentage points except population totals and income.

Location	Residents	Citizen adults	Left vote	Right vote	Employed	Swedish parents	Foreign heritage	Income SEK	Degree
Location			%	%					
Backe	1,268	1,029	51.3	48.0	80	90	10	20,469	24
Gäddede	786	610	51.8	46.7	79	86	14	23,109	27
Hammerdal	2,368	1,834	51.2	48.2	82	87	13	22,153	27
Hoting	828	637	50.4	48.8	75	88	12	20,605	19
Kyrktåsjö-Norråker	615	514	51.1	47.3	85	93	7	22,429	23
Näsviken	788	621	51.5	47.0	86	95	5	24,511	30
Strömsund	1,641	1,089	57.9	41.0	67	63	37	18,272	20
Västra Bredgård	1,665	1,299	55.5	43.0	86	92	8	24,166	26
Östra Bredgård	1,499	1,198	49.4	49.4	85	93	7	23,912	25
Source: SVT

== Economy ==
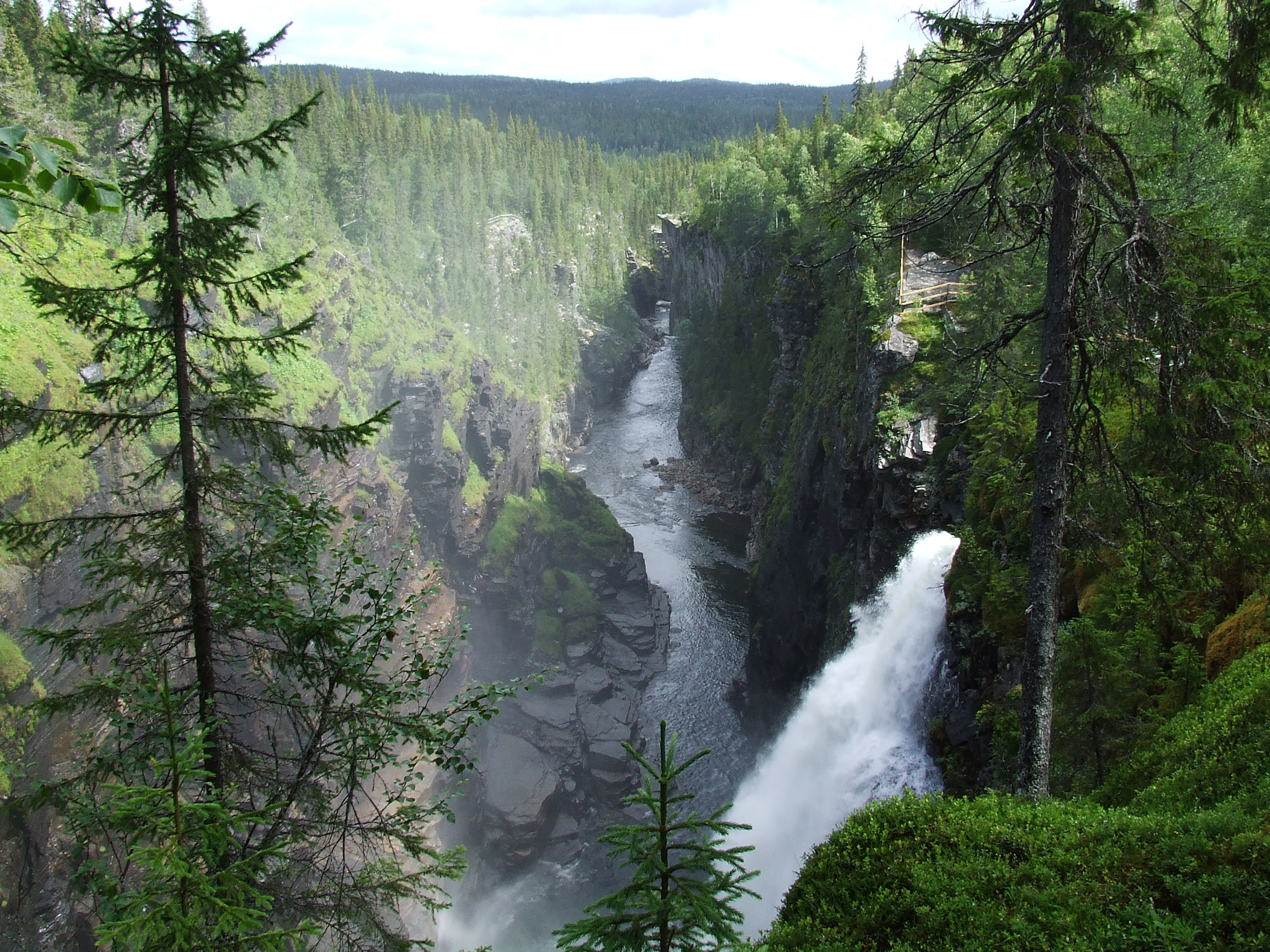
Hällingsåfallet.

Forest industry has traditionally been an important industry, but today tourism also has an important part. Like the rest of Jämtland, nature is what attracts visitors, with its blend of forests, mountains, lakes and rivers.

The two most visited sights are Hembygdsgården in Strömsund (16,000 visitors) and Hällingsåfallet (12,000 visitors).

Another popular site is the cave Korallgrottan.
