= Lilltjärnen (Frostviken, Jämtland, 712937-143825) =

- Location within Sweden
- Location: Strömsund Municipality, Jämtland, Sweden
- Coordinates: 64.2648°N 14.5309°E
- Type: lake

Lilltjärnen is a lake in Strömsund Municipality in Jämtland, Sweden. Lilltjärnen belongs to Natura 2000 project.
