= Pseudographis =

Pseudographis may refer to:

- Pseudographis, a genus of molluscs, synonym of Kejdonia
- Pseudographis (fungus), a genus of fungi
