= Dischinger =

Dischinger is a surname and may refer to:

- Franz Dischinger (1887–1953), pioneering German civil and structural engineer
- Rudolf Dischinger (1904–1988), German painter
- Terence "Terry" Gilbert Dischinger (1940–2023), American basketball player
- Hermann Dischinger (born 1944), German dialect author and poet
