= Lilltjärnen (Frostviken, Jämtland, 720074-142259) =

- Location within Sweden
- Location: Strömsund Municipality in Jämtland, Sweden
- Coordinates: 64.9025°N 14.1673°E
- Type: lake
- Surface area: 0.0321 square kilometres (0.0124 sq mi)
- Surface elevation: 468.7 metres (1,538 ft)

Lilltjärnen is a lake in Strömsund Municipality in Jämtland, Sweden. It has an area 0.0321 square kilometres (0.0124 sq mi) and is 468.7 metres (1,538 ft) above sea level.
