= Näsviken, Strömsund Municipality =

Näsviken
- Location in Strömsund Municipality in Jämtland County Näsviken (Sweden)
- Coordinates: 63°51′N 15°32′E
- Country: Sweden
- Province: Jämtland
- County: Jämtland County
- Municipality: Strömsund Municipality

Area
  - Total: 0.65 km^{2} (0.25 sq mi)

Population (31 December 2010)
  - Total: 203
  - Density: 313/km^{2} (810/sq mi)
- Time zone: UTC+1 (CET)
  - Summer (DST): UTC+2 (CEST)

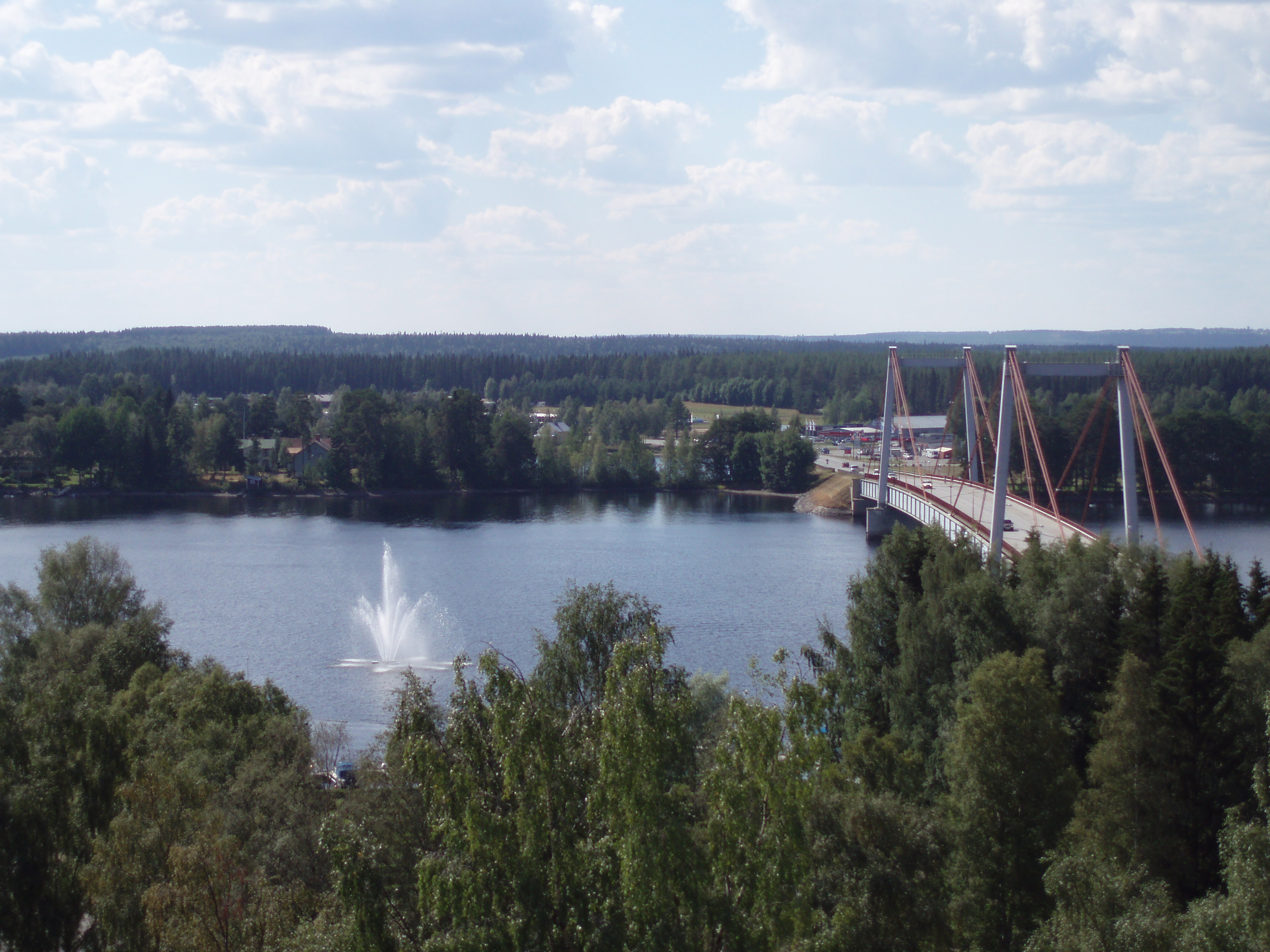
Strömsund Bridge crossing Ströms Vattudal, looking towards Näsviken

Näsviken is a locality situated in Strömsund Municipality, Jämtland County, Sweden with 203 inhabitants in 2023, experiencing an annual population change of -2.4%.
