= Backe, Sweden =

Backe
- Location within Jämtland Location within Sweden
- Coordinates: 63°49′N 16°24′E
- Country: Sweden
- Province: Ångermanland
- County: Jämtland County
- Municipality: Strömsund Municipality

Area
  - Total: 1.26 km^{2} (0.49 sq mi)

Population (31 December 2010)
  - Total: 599
  - Density: 475/km^{2} (1,230/sq mi)
- Time zone: UTC+1 (CET)
  - Summer (DST): UTC+2 (CEST)

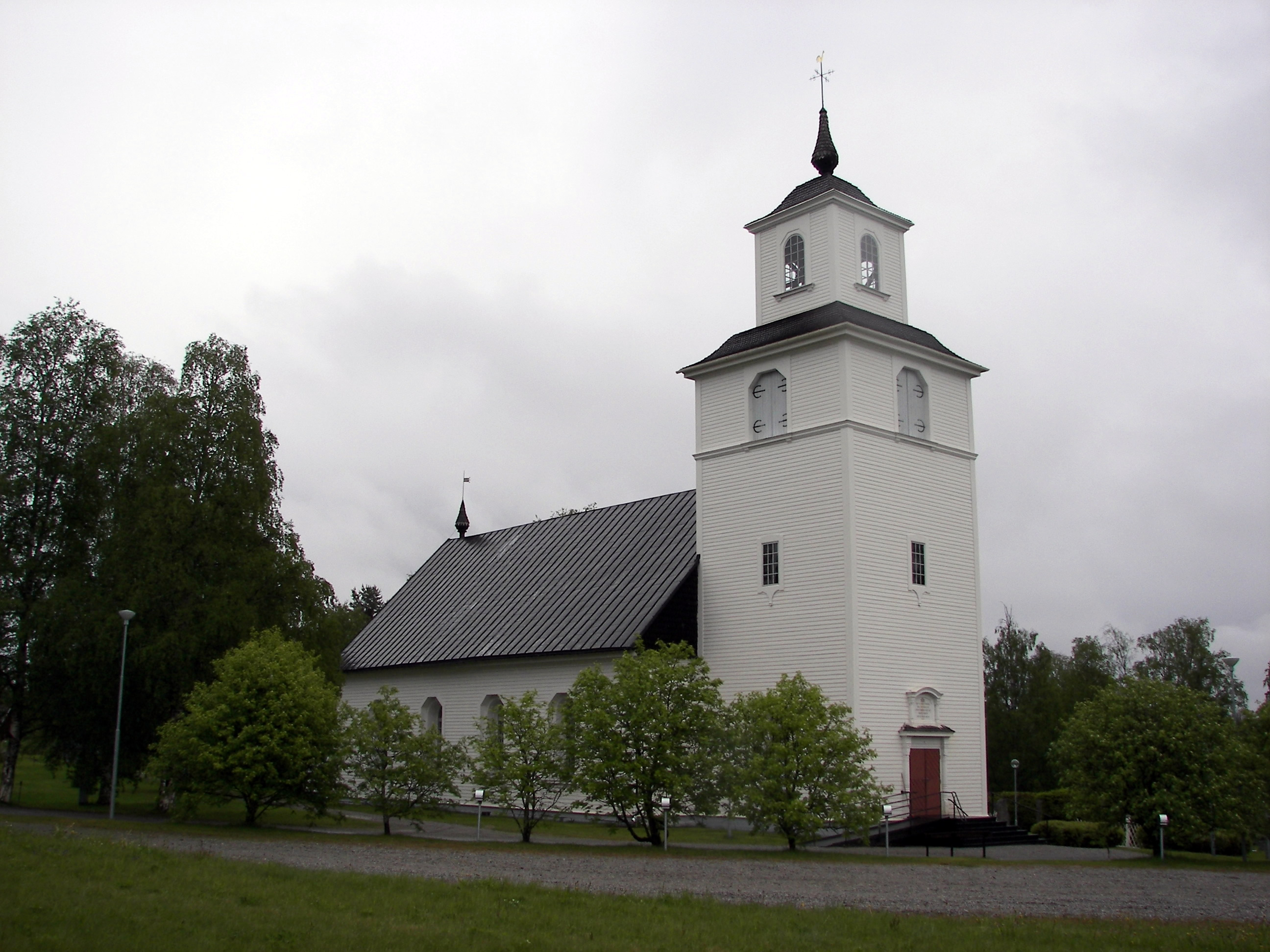
Fjällsjö church in Backe, Sweden

Backe is a locality situated in Strömsund Municipality, Jämtland County, Sweden with 599 inhabitants in 2010.
