= Strömsund Bridge =

Cable-stayed road bridge in Strömsund, Jämtland, Sweden

Coordinates: 63°50′59″N 15°32′46″E

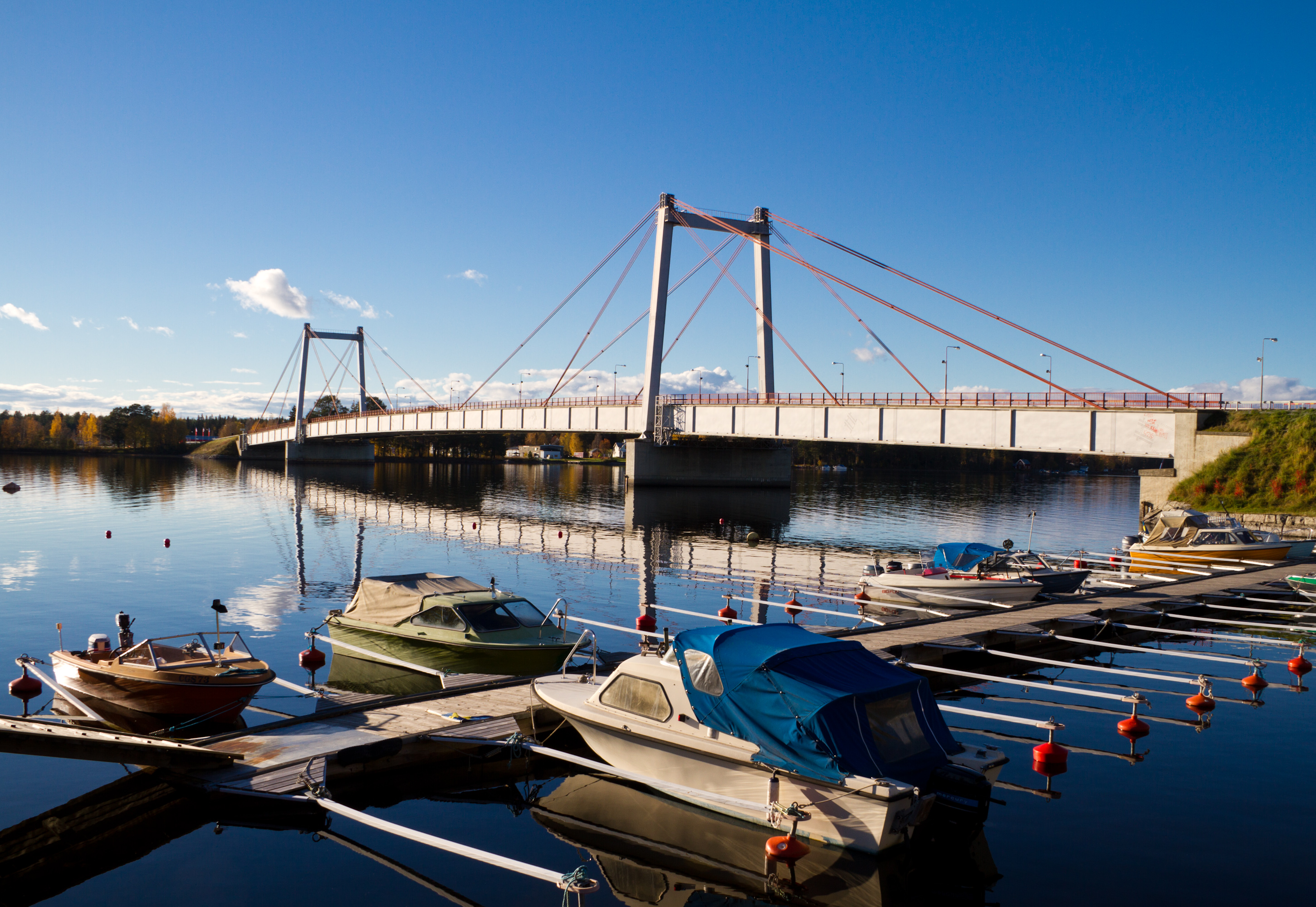
View of Strömsund Bridge from eastern side

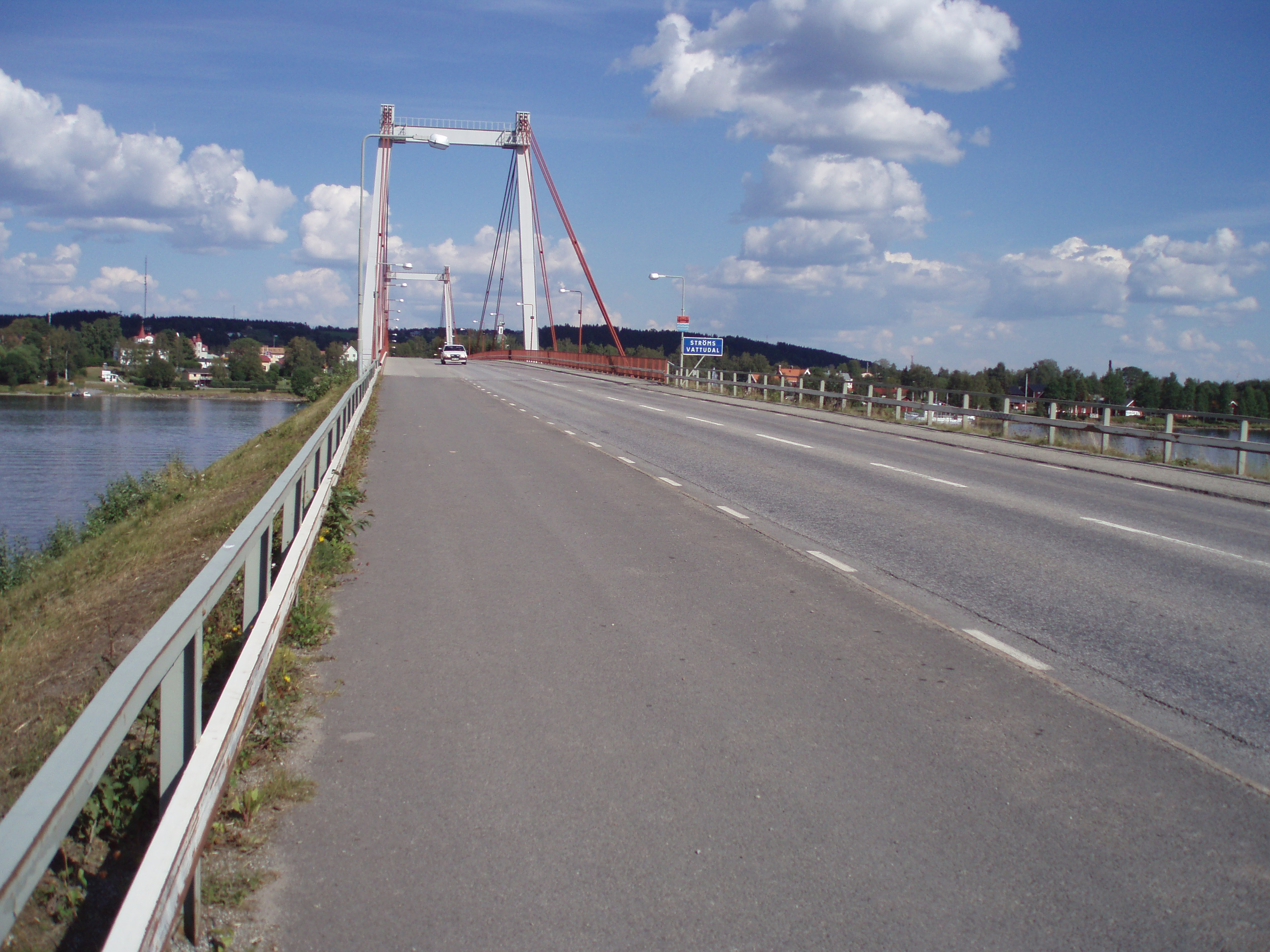
View of Strömsund Bridge from western side

The Strömsund Bridge (Swedish: Strömsundsbron) is a cable-stayed road bridge, bringing road E45 over Ströms vattudal, in Strömsund, Jämtland, Sweden.

The bridge is 332 m (1,089 ft) long, with a 182 m (597 ft) main span. Differing from what is stated almost throughout, the bridge was not designed by the German civil engineer Franz Dischinger, who at the time was already deceased. Instead, the design was submitted in 1953 for an international competition by the German steel construction company Demag (which had previously cooperated intensively with Dischinger). The structure, which opened in 1956, is considered to be the world's first large cable-stayed bridge of the modern type and was built by Demag together with the Swedish concrete construction company Skanska. The bridge is colloquially referred to as "Jämtland's Golden Gate".

== Major repairs ==
Between 2021 and 2026 the Strömsund bridge was subject to a major renovation. Cable stays have been renewed and the bridge was reinforced to be capable of bearing 74 tons.

== Bridge damaged and closed ==
On 29 September 2026 the Strömsund bridge was damaged and closed after a very heavy transport, weighing 100 tons, drove over it. Trafikverket (the Swedish transport administration) had issued a license to transport a transformer unit weighing 62 400 kg to Mo i Rana in Norway. It is expected that the bridge will remain closed for at least one month, but, depending on the outcome of the inspection of the bridge, the actual repair may take longer. The traffic is shown a detour which includes a gravel road.
