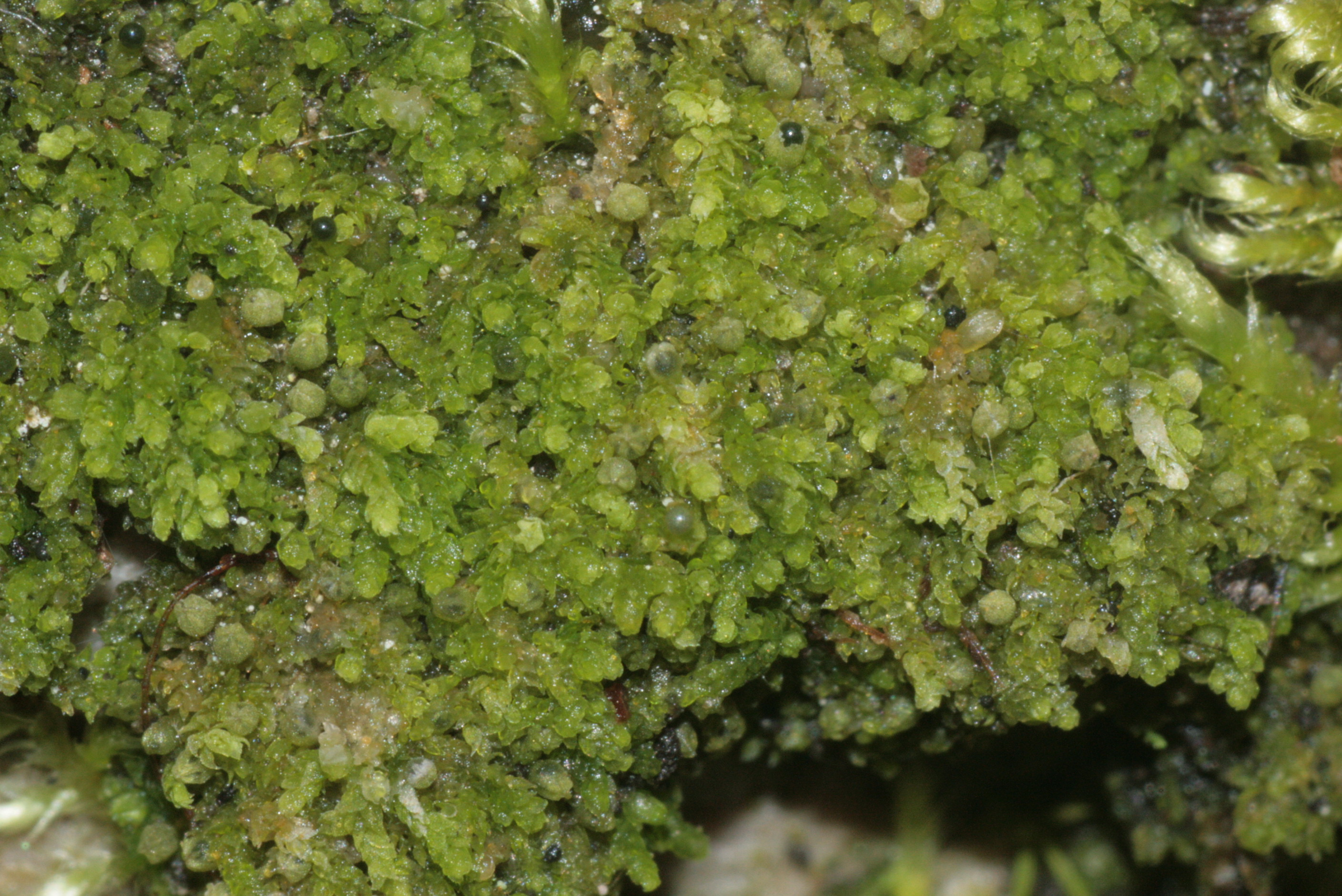
- Cololejeunea calcarea

Scientific classification
- Kingdom: Plantae
- Division: Marchantiophyta
- Class: Jungermanniopsida
- Subclass: Jungermanniidae
- Order: Lejeuneales
- Family: Lejeuneaceae
- Genus: Cololejeunea (Spruce) Schiffn.

Species
- Several, including: Cololejeunea calcarea; Cololejeunea cuneata; Cololejeunea elegans; Cololejeunea khanii; See List of Cololejeunea species (for full list)

= Cololejeunea =

Genus of liverworts

Cololejeunea is a genus of liverworts in the family Lejeuneaceae.

They have a cosmopolitan distribution worldwide.

The GBIF lists up to 534 species (as of June 2023), whereas World Flora Online lists only 494 results. See List of Cololejeunea species for GBIF list of species.
