= Rossön =

- Location within Jämtland Location within Sweden
- Coordinates: 63°56′N 16°21′E
- Country: Sweden
- Province: Ångermanland
- County: Jämtland County
- Municipality: Strömsund Municipality

Area
  - Total: 1.54 km^{2} (0.59 sq mi)

Population (31 December 2010)
  - Total: 352
  - Density: 229/km^{2} (590/sq mi)
- Time zone: UTC+1 (CET)
  - Summer (DST): UTC+2 (CEST)

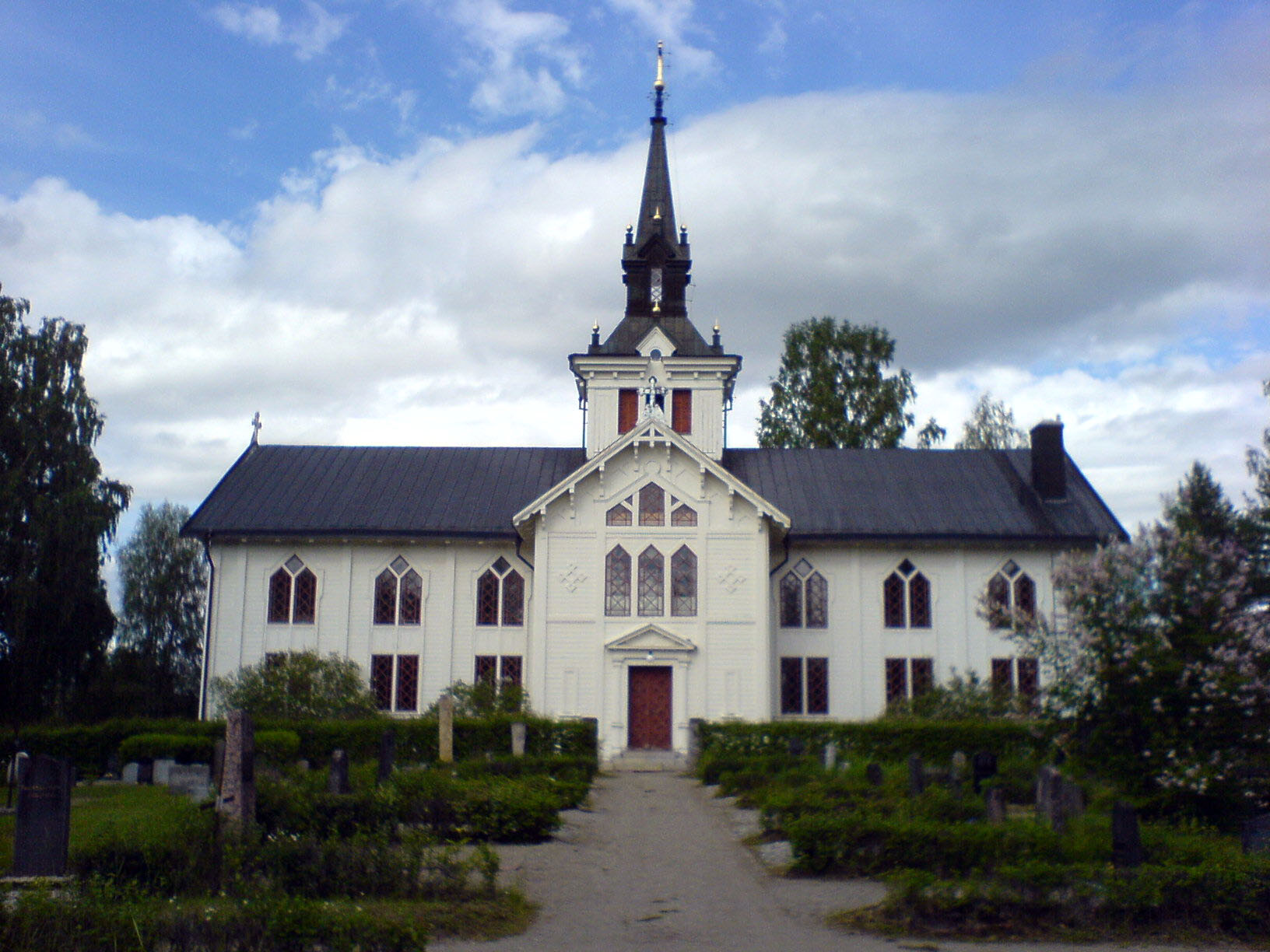
Bodums church in Rossön

Rossön is a locality situated in Strömsund Municipality, Jämtland County, Sweden with 352 inhabitants in 2010.
