= Strömsund =

Strömsund Straejmie
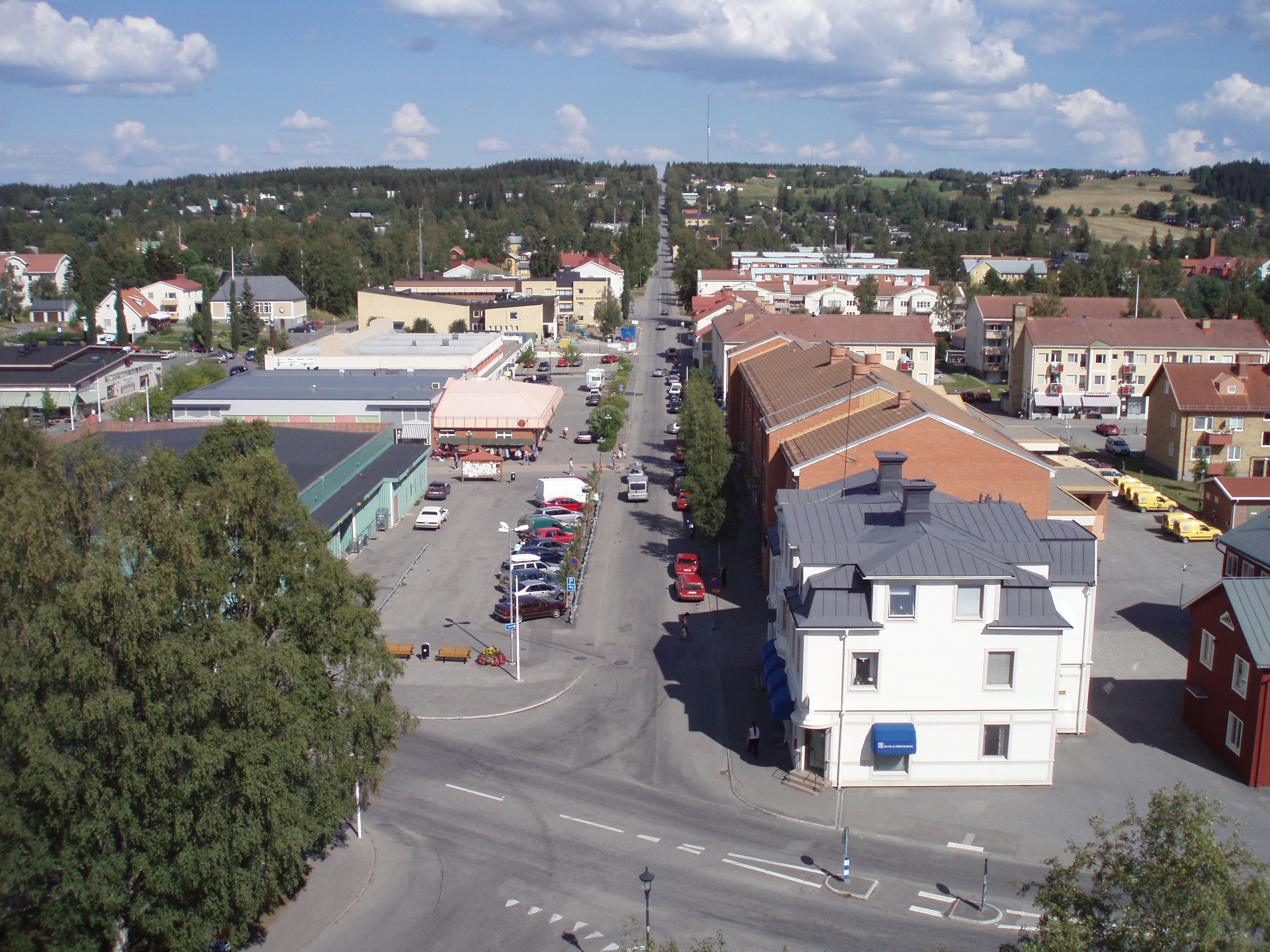
- Strömsund

- Location within Jämtland Location within Sweden
- Coordinates: 63°51′10″N 15°33′28″E
- Country: Sweden
- Province: Jämtland
- County: Jämtland County
- Municipality: Strömsund Municipality

Area
  - Total: 3.63 km^{2} (1.40 sq mi)

Population (31 December 2010)
  - Total: 3,589
  - Density: 990/km^{2} (2,600/sq mi)
- Time zone: UTC+1 (CET)
  - Summer (DST): UTC+2 (CEST)

Strömsund (Swedish pronunciation: [ˈstrœ̂mːsɵnd]; Southern Sami: Straejmie) is a locality and the seat of Strömsund Municipality in Jämtland County, Sweden, with 3,589 inhabitants in 2010.

The church (Ströms kyrka) was inaugurated in 1847.The Grand Hotel dates to 1909. The Court House (Tingshuset) was inaugurated in 1911 and was designed by architect Frans Bertil Wallberg (1862–1935). Strömsund railway station was built in 1913. It is on a branch line from Ulriksfors at the Inland Line. Strömsund Bridge (Strömsundsbron), a cable-stayed road bridge, bringing European route E45 over Ströms vattudal in Strömsund, opened in 1956. Strömsund's Municipal Building (Strömsunds kommunalhus) was designed by architect firm Klemming & Thelaus in 1958.

Strömsund is noted for being pictured in the 1974 Swedish movie Dunderklumpen! directed by Per Åhlin.

The following sports clubs are located in Strömsund:

- IFK Strömsund
- IBK Strömsund

== Gallery ==
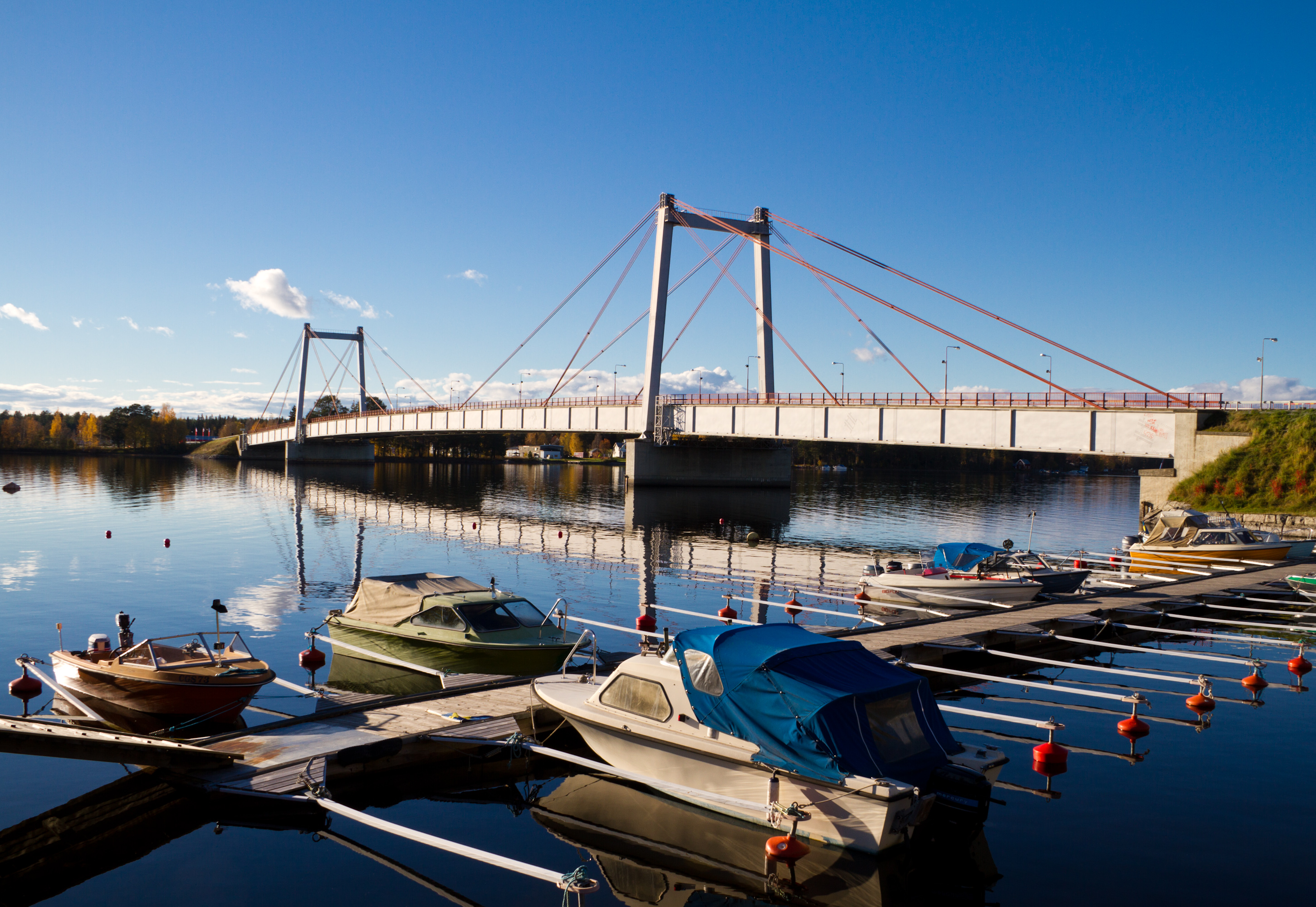
Strömsund Bridge

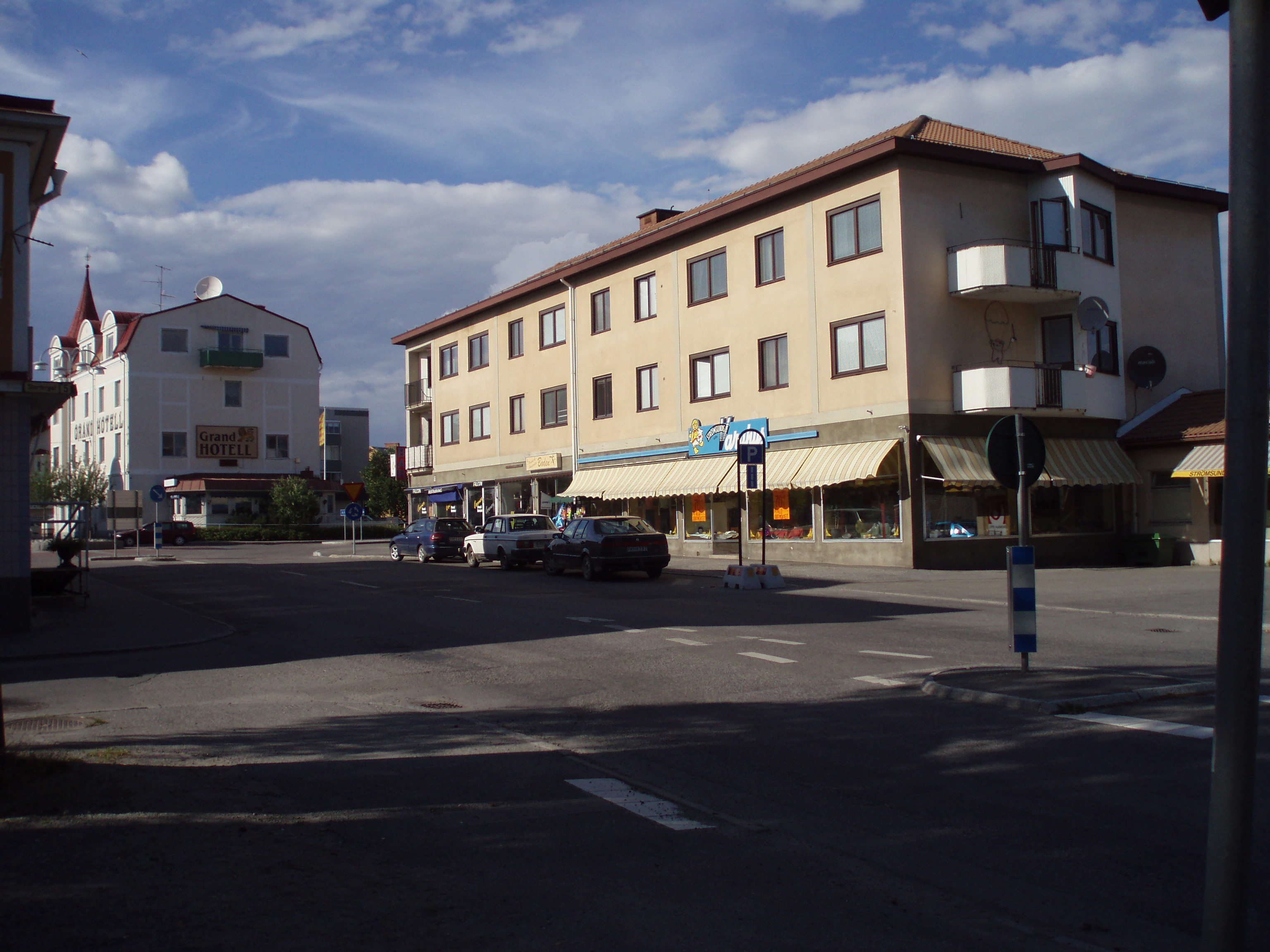
Bredgårdsgatan and Grand Hotel

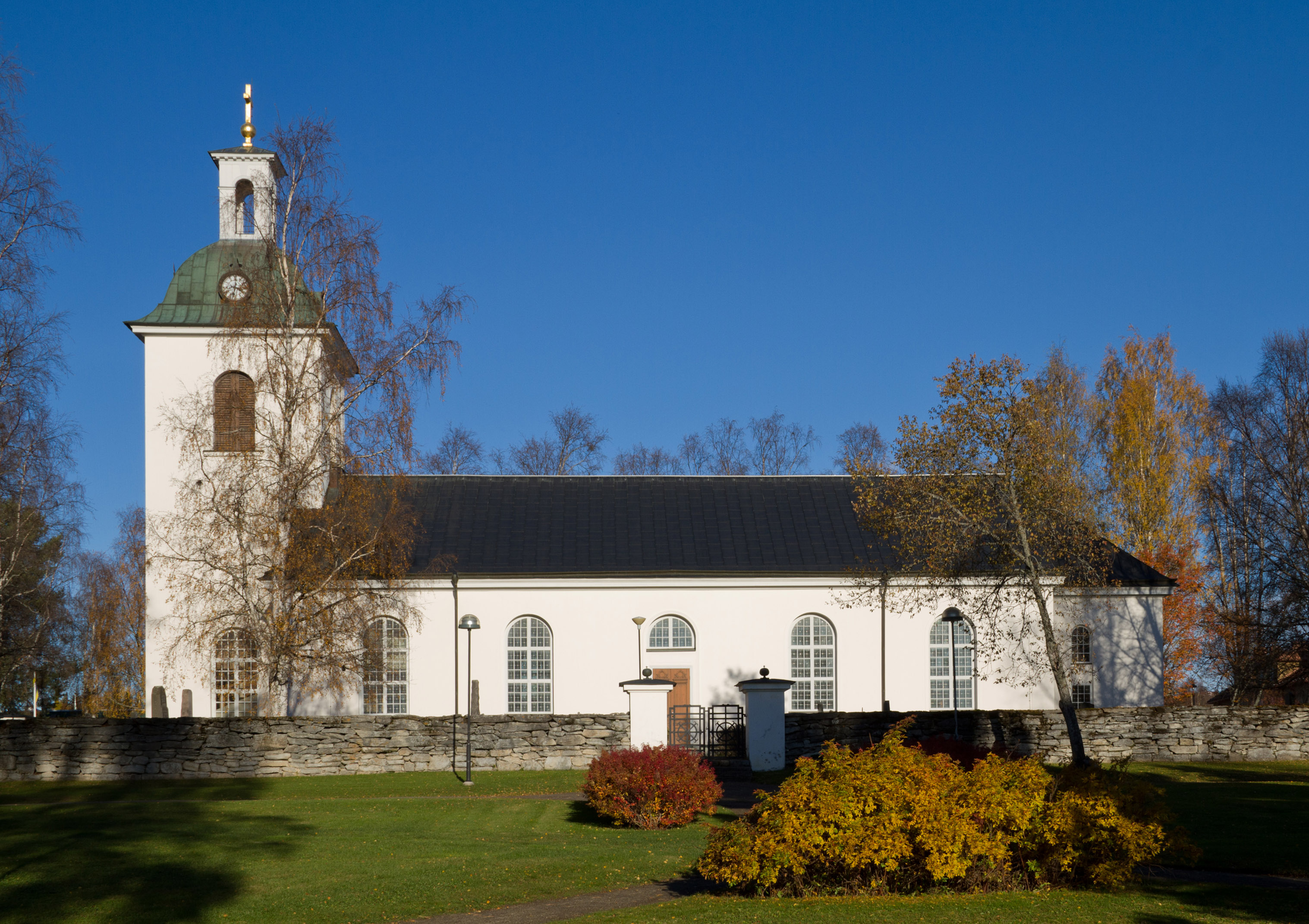
Ströms Church

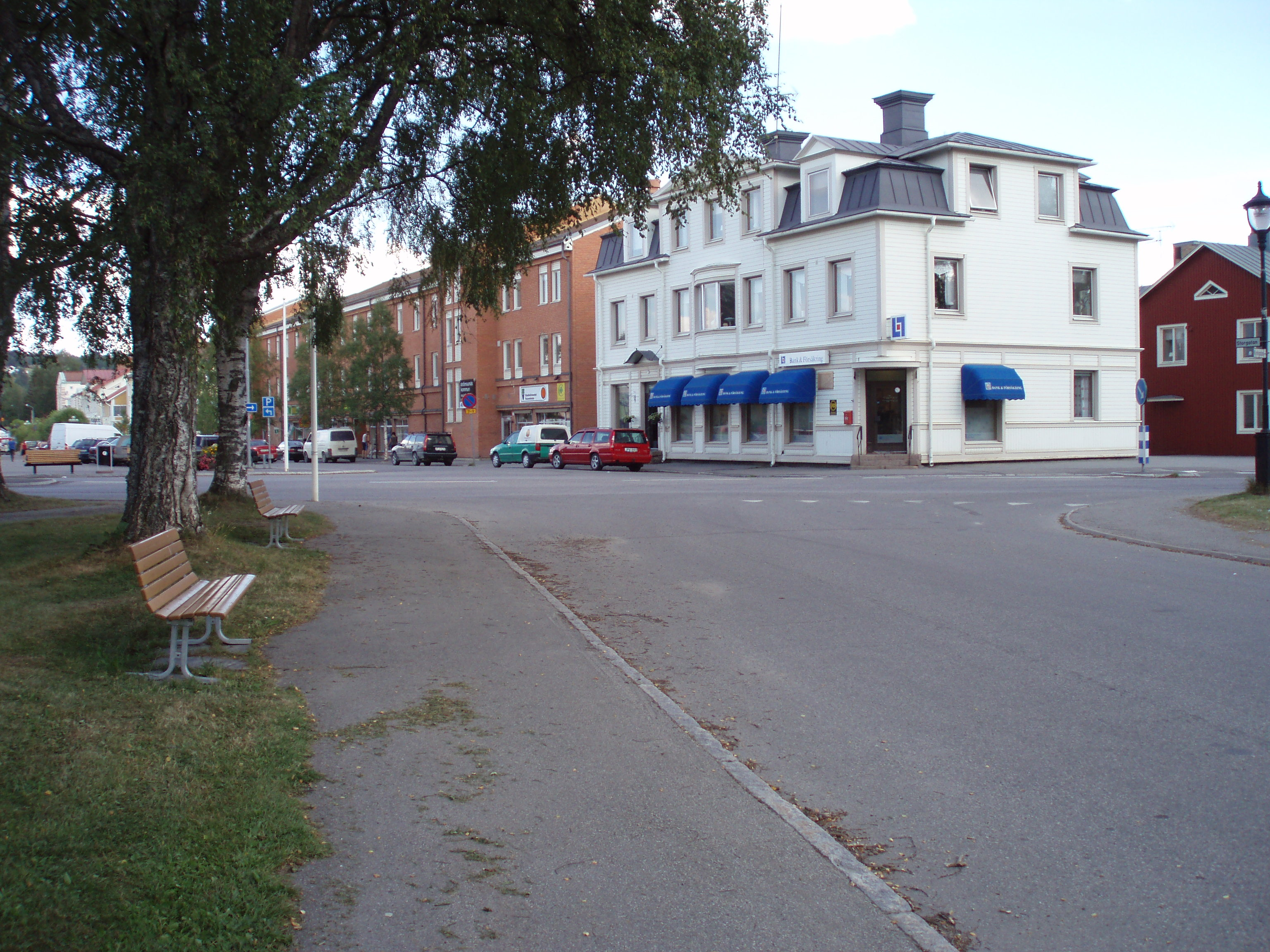
Strömsund Main Street
