= Hoting =

Hoting,Sweden
- Location within Jämtland Location within Sweden
- Coordinates: 64°07′N 16°10′E
- Country: Sweden
- Province: Ångermanland
- County: Jämtland County
- Municipality: Strömsund Municipality

Area
  - Total: 1.27 km^{2} (0.49 sq mi)

Population (31 December 2010)
  - Total: 667
  - Density: 525/km^{2} (1,360/sq mi)
- Time zone: UTC+1 (CET)
  - Summer (DST): UTC+2 (CEST)

Hoting is a locality situated in Tåsjö parish, Strömsund Municipality, Jämtland County, Sweden with 667 inhabitants in 2010. Hoting was mentioned in documents regarding Sweden/Norway border rulings in 1273.

== Climate ==
Hoting has a subarctic climate. Located in northern Jämtland at a great distance from both the Atlantic and the Bothnian seas, it has a more continental climate than the regional seat Östersund, leading to warmer summers in spite of the higher latitude. Winters are cold by Swedish standards for the latitude due to being located at a distance from both the North Atlantic and the Bothnian Bay.

Climate data for Hoting (2002–2021 averages; extremes since 1969)
Month	Jan	Feb	Mar	Apr	May	Jun	Jul	Aug	Sep	Oct	Nov	Dec	Year
Record high °C (°F)	10.0 (50.0)	9.2 (48.6)	14.7 (58.5)	20.6 (69.1)	28.5 (83.3)	30.2 (86.4)	31.7 (89.1)	28.6 (83.5)	25.4 (77.7)	20.5 (68.9)	13.1 (55.6)	9.2 (48.6)	31.7 (89.1)
Mean maximum °C (°F)	3.7 (38.7)	4.7 (40.5)	8.0 (46.4)	15.2 (59.4)	23.1 (73.6)	25.8 (78.4)	27.7 (81.9)	25.1 (77.2)	19.4 (66.9)	12.8 (55.0)	7.0 (44.6)	4.9 (40.8)	28.6 (83.5)
Mean daily maximum °C (°F)	−5.4 (22.3)	−3.6 (25.5)	1.4 (34.5)	7.2 (45.0)	13.6 (56.5)	18.2 (64.8)	20.9 (69.6)	18.7 (65.7)	13.1 (55.6)	5.9 (42.6)	0.1 (32.2)	−2.9 (26.8)	7.3 (45.1)
Daily mean °C (°F)	−9.8 (14.4)	−8.6 (16.5)	−4.0 (24.8)	2.1 (35.8)	8.0 (46.4)	12.8 (55.0)	15.7 (60.3)	13.9 (57.0)	9.2 (48.6)	2.9 (37.2)	−2.8 (27.0)	−6.8 (19.8)	2.7 (36.9)
Mean daily minimum °C (°F)	−14.2 (6.4)	−13.5 (7.7)	−9.3 (15.3)	−3.0 (26.6)	2.3 (36.1)	7.4 (45.3)	10.4 (50.7)	9.0 (48.2)	5.2 (41.4)	−0.1 (31.8)	−5.6 (21.9)	−10.6 (12.9)	−1.8 (28.7)
Mean minimum °C (°F)	−29.5 (−21.1)	−28.3 (−18.9)	−24.2 (−11.6)	−12.0 (10.4)	−4.3 (24.3)	1.7 (35.1)	4.3 (39.7)	2.7 (36.9)	−1.2 (29.8)	−8.8 (16.2)	−17.0 (1.4)	−24.9 (−12.8)	−32.1 (−25.8)
Record low °C (°F)	−42.0 (−43.6)	−42.5 (−44.5)	−33.0 (−27.4)	−22.3 (−8.1)	−10.9 (12.4)	−3.0 (26.6)	−0.4 (31.3)	−2.4 (27.7)	−9.5 (14.9)	−24.8 (−12.6)	−34.9 (−30.8)	−42.0 (−43.6)	−42.5 (−44.5)
Average precipitation mm (inches)	42.6 (1.68)	29.8 (1.17)	28.2 (1.11)	28.4 (1.12)	49.1 (1.93)	61.3 (2.41)	68.9 (2.71)	73.0 (2.87)	62.4 (2.46)	53.0 (2.09)	44.3 (1.74)	48.0 (1.89)	589 (23.18)
Average extreme snow depth cm (inches)	45 (18)	54 (21)	56 (22)	43 (17)	3 (1.2)	0 (0)	0 (0)	0 (0)	0 (0)	6 (2.4)	14 (5.5)	28 (11)	59 (23)
Source 1: SMHI Open Data for Hoting - Precipitation
Source 2: SMHI Open Data for Hoting - Temperature
