= Sticta hallii =

Scientific classification
- Kingdom: Fungi
- Division: Ascomycota
- Class: Lecanoromycetes
- Order: Peltigerales
- Family: Peltigeraceae
- Genus: Sticta
- Species: S. hallii

Binomial name
- Sticta hallii Tuck., 1877

Species of fungus

Sticta hallii is a species of fungus belonging to the family Peltigeraceae.

Synonym:

- Lobaria hallii
