= Cololejeunea elegans =

Scientific classification
- Kingdom: Plantae
- Division: Marchantiophyta
- Class: Jungermanniopsida
- Order: Lejeuneales
- Family: Lejeuneaceae
- Genus: Cololejeunea
- Species: C. elegans

Binomial name
- Cololejeunea elegans Steph.

Synonyms
- Lejeunea elegans (Steph.) Prantl; Physocolea elegans (Steph.) Steph.; Physocolea xaveri Lacout. ex Steph.; Cololejeunea xaveri (Lacout. ex Steph.) E.W. Jones

Species of liverwort

Cololejeunea elegans is a species of liverworts in the family Lejeuneaceae.

== Distribution and habitat ==
Cololejeunea elegans widely distributed in montane areas of tropical Africa, including Cameroon, the Comoro Islands, Equatorial Guinea (Bioko Island and Rio Muni), Ethiopia, Ghana, Kenya, Mauritius, Madagascar, Malawi, Mozambique, and Tanzania.
