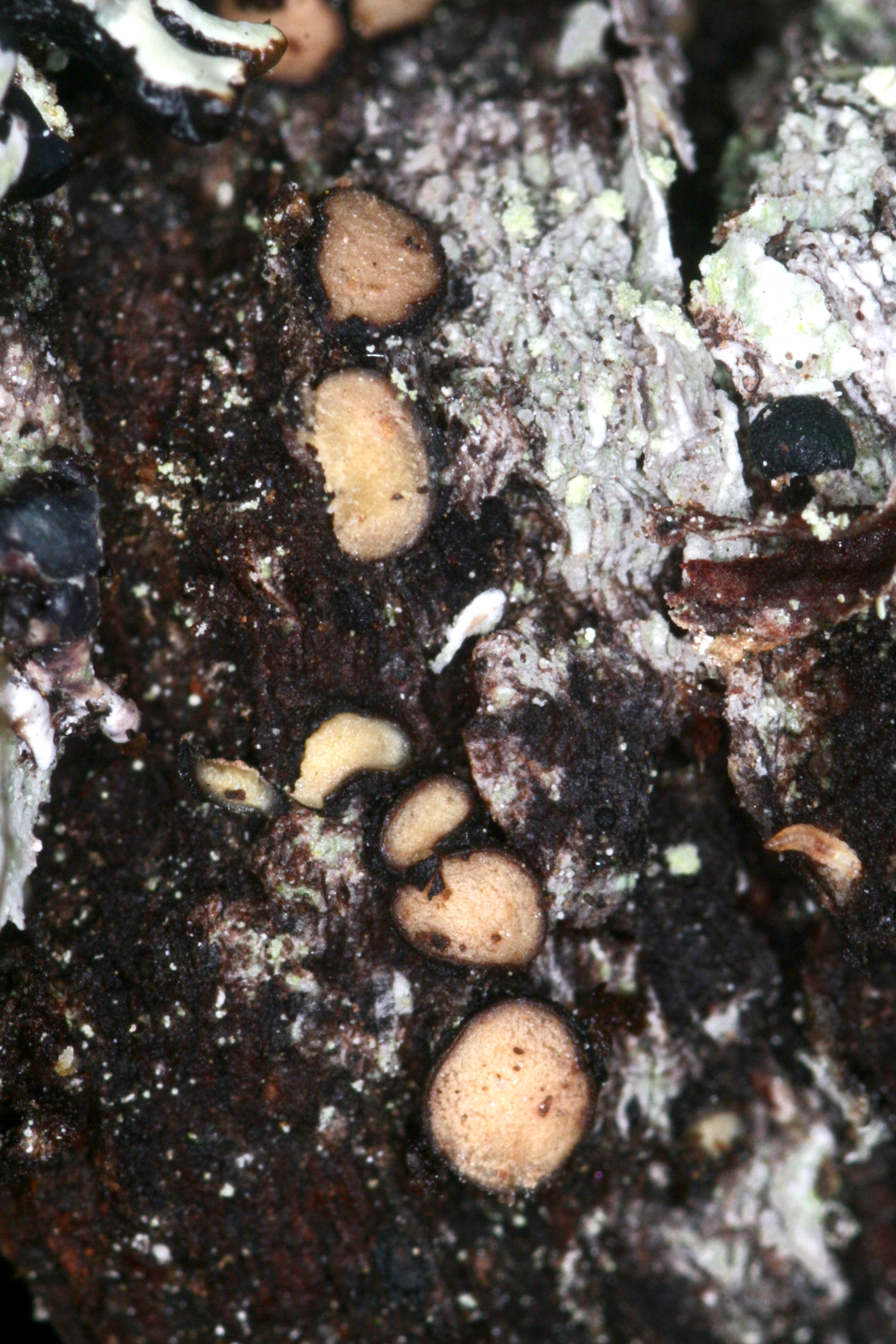

Scientific classification
- Domain: Eukaryota
- Kingdom: Fungi
- Division: Ascomycota
- Class: Leotiomycetes
- Order: Rhytismatales
- Family: Rhytismataceae
- Genus: Pseudographis
- Species: P. pinicola

Binomial name
- Pseudographis pinicola pinicola (Nyl.) Rehm

= Pseudographis pinicola =

Species of fungus

Pseudographis pinicola is a species of fungus belonging to the family Triblidiaceae.

It is native to Eurasia.
