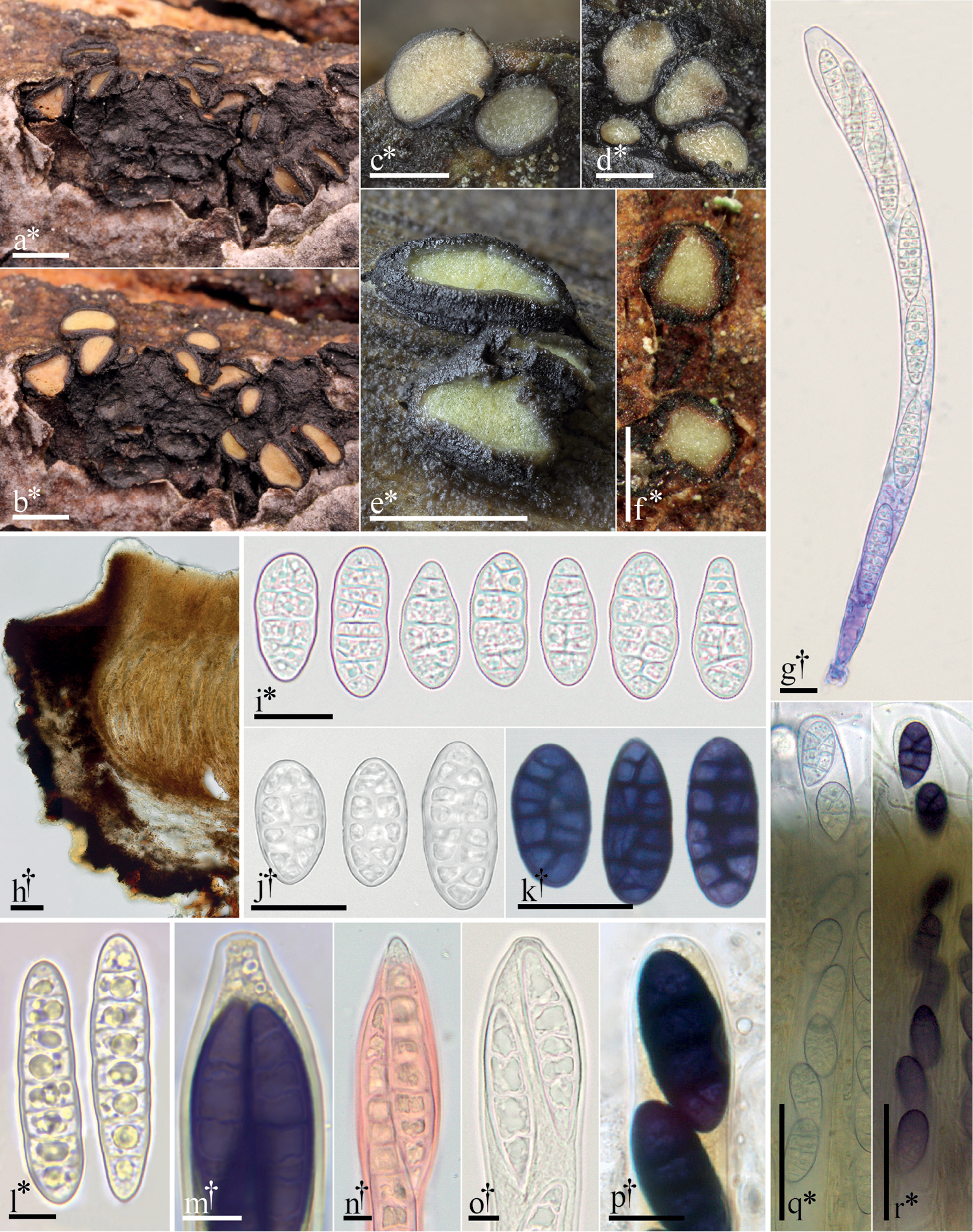
- Morphological features of Pseudographis. a–e, g, l–o Pseudographis pinicola, now Pseudographis rufonigra a dried apothecia on bark b same apothecia hydrated c–e hydrated apothecia g dead ascus containing living ascospores (cb), l ascospores m ascus containing mature ascospores, detail of apex (in dilute L) n ascospore emerging from ascus apex (Cr) o ascus apex. f, h–k, p–r Pseudographis elatina f hydrated ascomata h 15 µm thick longitudinal section i–j ascospores k ascospores (in dilute L) p detail of ascus apex (L) q turgid ascus r same ascus (in dilute L). All microphotographs of cells and tissues mounted in water unless otherwise noted: cresyl blue (cb), Congo red (Cr), Lugol's solution (L). † = dead, * = living. Scale bars: 1 mm (a–f); 50 µm (h, q–r); 20 µm (i–k); 10 µm (g, n–p); 5 µm (l–m)

Scientific classification
- Domain: Eukaryota
- Kingdom: Fungi
- Division: Ascomycota
- Class: Leotiomycetes
- Order: Rhytismatales
- Family: Rhytismataceae
- Genus: Pseudographis; Nyl.

= Pseudographis (fungus) =

Genus of fungi

Pseudographis is a genus of fungi belonging to the family Rhytismataceae.

The genus was first described by William Nylander in 1855.

The species of this genus are found in Eurasia and Northern America.
