= Franz Dischinger =

German civil and structural engineer

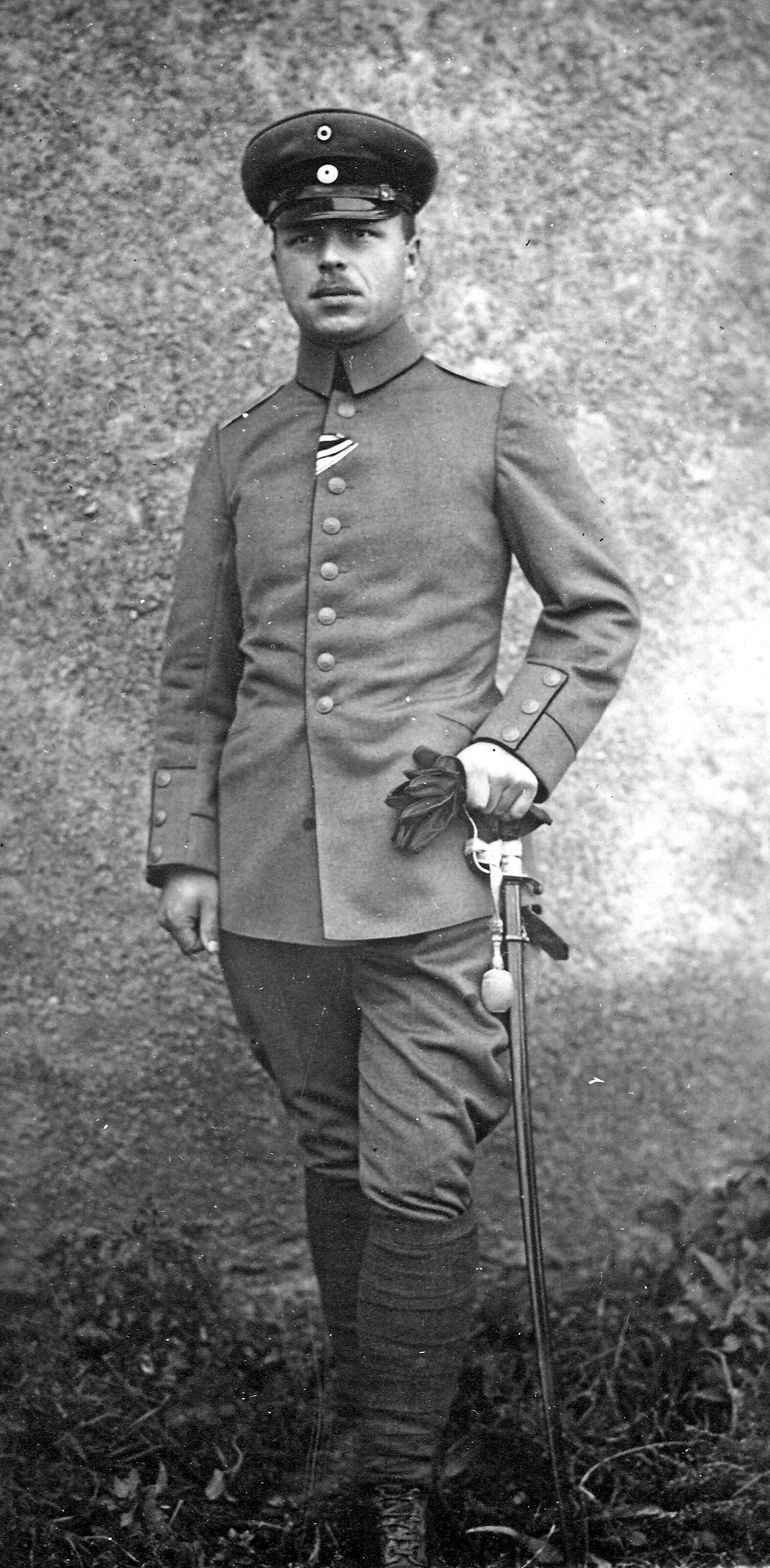
- Franz Dischinger

Franz Dischinger (8 October 1887 - 9 January 1953) was a pioneering German civil and structural engineer, responsible for the development of the modern cable-stayed bridge. He was also a pioneer of the use of prestressed concrete, patenting the technique of external prestressing (where the prestressing bars or tendons are not encased in the concrete) in 1934.

After completing Gymnasium in Karlsruhe, Germany, Dischinger went to the Technische Hoschschule Karlsruhe (now Karlsruhe Institute of Technology) where he studied and received a degree in building engineering. After getting his degree in 1913, he then started working for Dyckerhoff & Widmann A.G., an engineering firm in Germany. In 1928 Dischinger went back to school to receive his doctorate at the Technische Hoschschule Dresden (now TU Dresden), Germany.

In 1922, he designed the Zeiss Planetarium in Jena with Walther Bauersfeld, using a thin-shell concrete roof in the shape of a hemisphere. Their system was subsequently patented, and Dischinger published a paper on the relevant mathematics in 1928.

Since the previous stay and cable bridges in Dischinger's opinion were both flawed technically and disturbing looking, he decided to publish his own cable stayed bridge. This design has been used ever since, more than 100 of these cable stayed bridges have been built.

For the 1938 design of a rail suspension bridge (not built), he had studied historical bridges incorporating inclined stay elements, such as those by Ferdinand Arnodin and John Roebling. He went on to design the 183 m span Strömsund Bridge in Sweden, completed in 1955 and generally considered the first of the modern tradition of cable-stayed bridges, although there had been many isolated examples of the bridge form before then. This employed a steel deck and cables, with large spacings between the stays typical of the early designs. It appears in Strömsund's coat of arms.

Other key works include:

- Großmarkthalle, Basel, Switzerland, 1929 (dome roof)
- Market Hall, Leipzig, Germany, 1930 (polygonal dome roofs)
- Koblenz bridge, Germany, 1935 (three arch concrete bridge)
- Aue bridge, Germany, 1936
- Cologne Rodenkirchen Bridge, Cologne, Germany, 1954 (with others, including Fritz Leonhardt)
