= Ströms vattudal =

Water system in Jämtland County, Sweden

Coordinates: 63°59′02″N 15°24′30″E

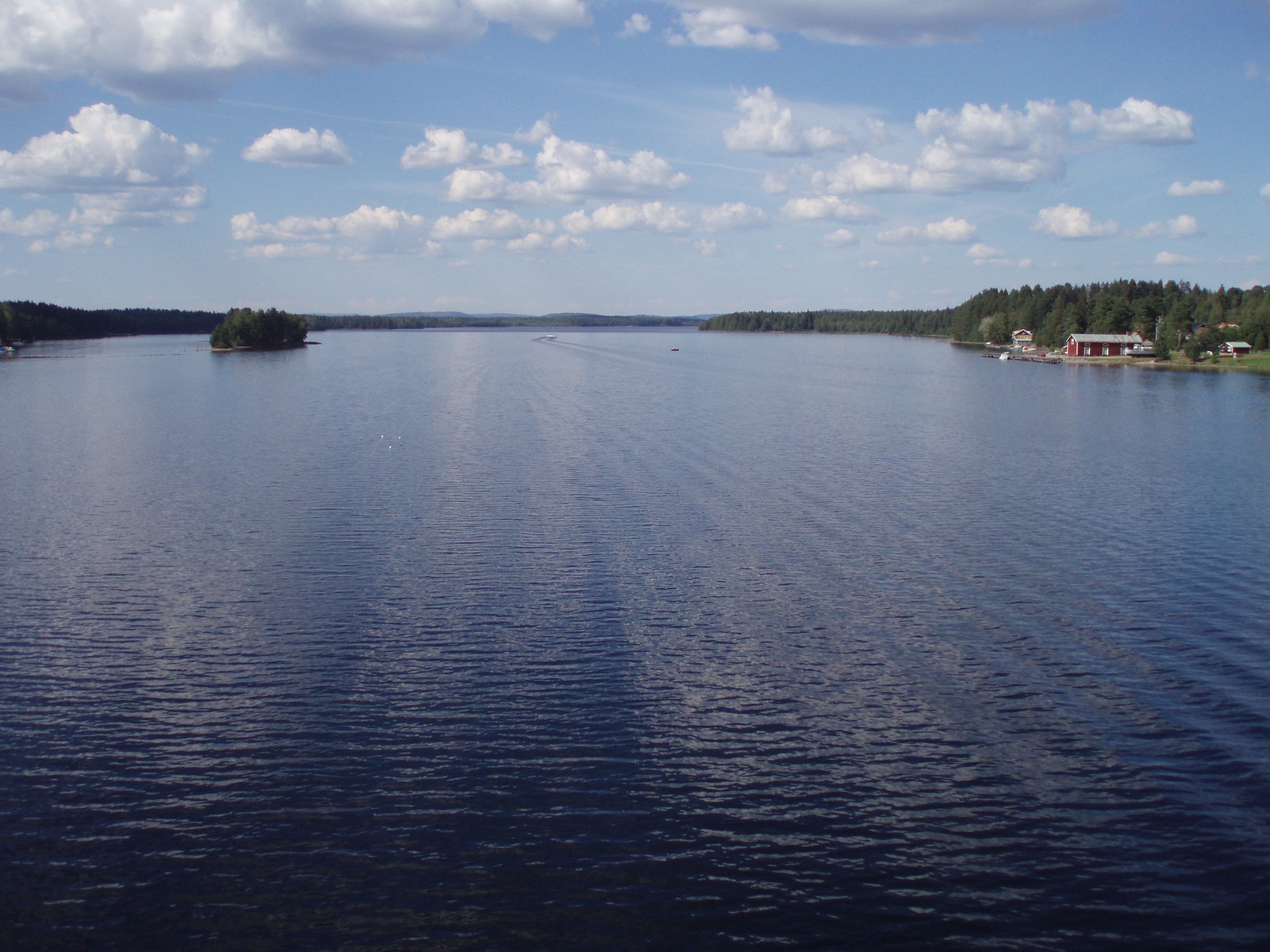
Ströms Vattudal, Strömsund, Sweden.

Ströms vattudal is an extensive water system in the northern parts of Jämtland in Sweden. The water system stretches from Kvarnbergsvattnet in the north, close to Gäddede on the border to Norway, to Russfjärden in Strömsund in the south where it flows into Faxälven near Ulriksfors.

It is part of the Ångerman drainage basin.
