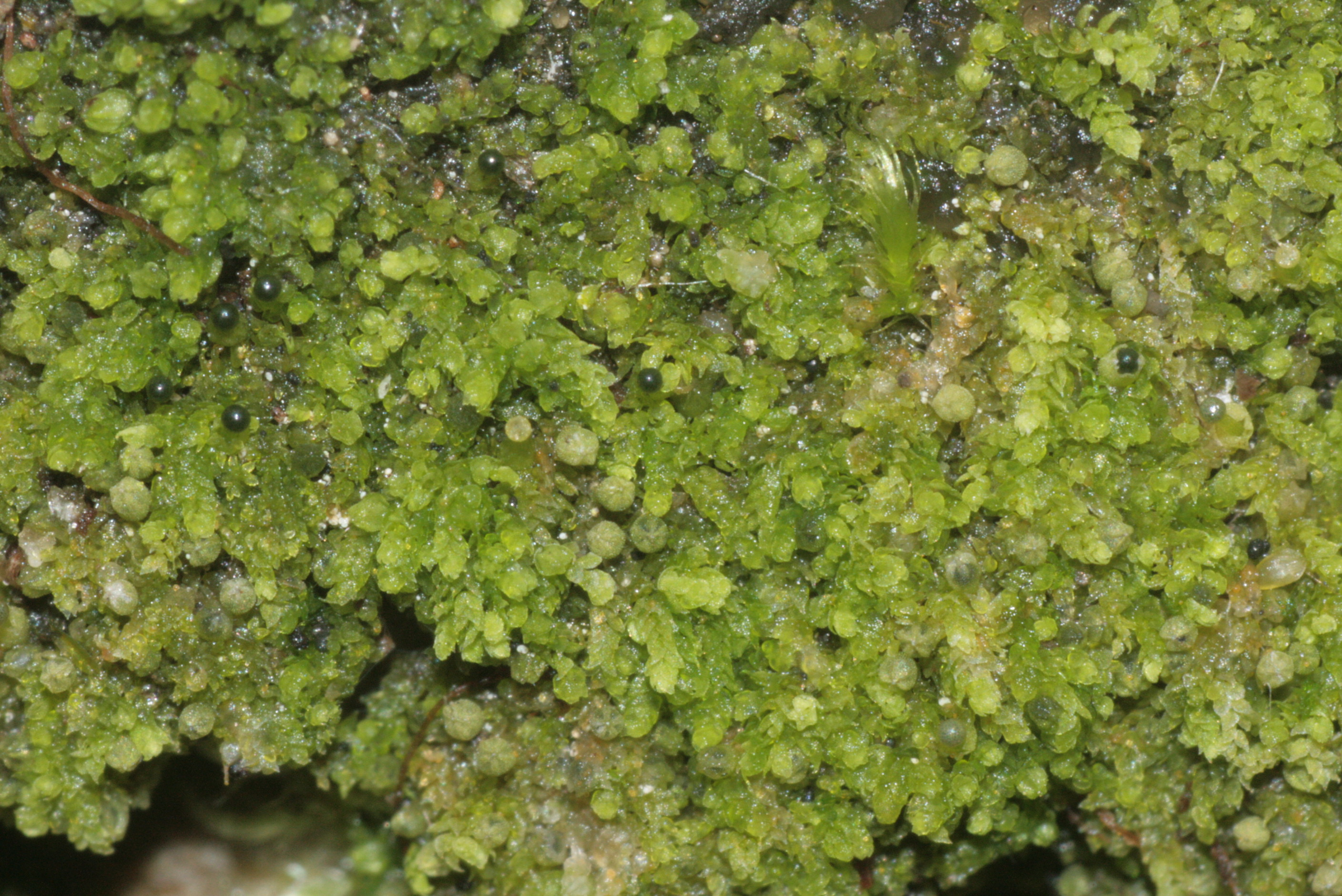

Scientific classification
- Kingdom: Plantae
- Division: Marchantiophyta
- Class: Jungermanniopsida
- Order: Lejeuneales
- Family: Lejeuneaceae
- Genus: Cololejeunea
- Species: C. calcarea

Binomial name
- Cololejeunea calcarea (Lib.) Stephani

= Cololejeunea calcarea =

Species of liverwort

Cololejeunea calcarea is a species of liverwort belonging to the family Lejeuneaceae.

It is native to Europe.
