= Chasmophyte =

Plant adapted to growing in rock crevices

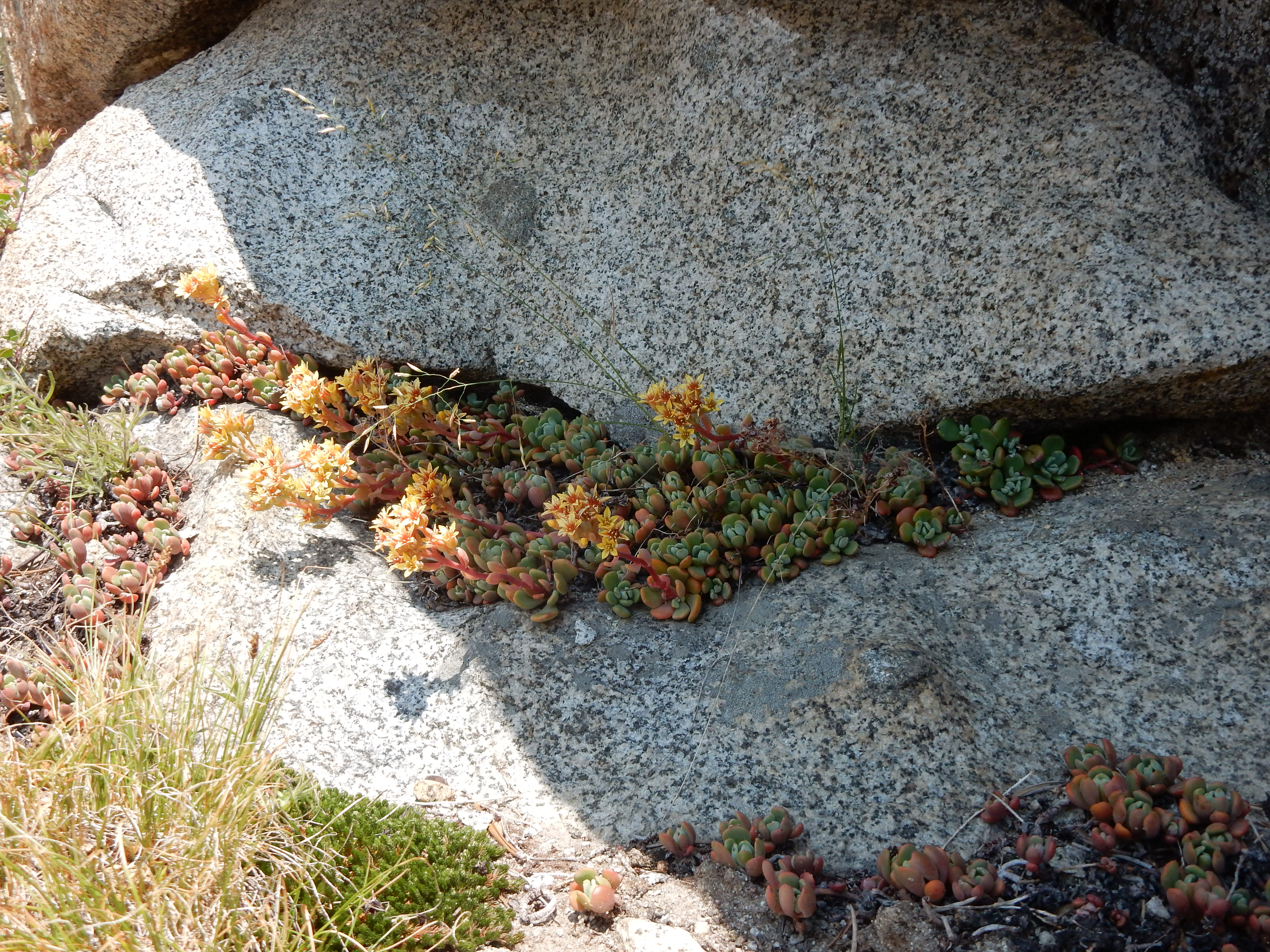
Sierra stonecrop is most common in crevices of rock outcrops and cliffs faces.

A chasmophyte, or crevice plant, is a plant adapted to grow in rock crevices, cliff faces, stone walls, and other narrow fissures, where accumulated humus, soil, and organic matter provide access to water and nutrients. The term is derived from the Greek words chasma ("crevice" or "gorge") and phyte ("plant"). Chasmophytes differ from lithophytes in that the term refers specifically to plants growing in rock fissures, cracks, and crevices, whereas lithophytes include all plants that grow on or among rocks, including those rooted on rock surfaces.

In horticulture, crevice gardens have been used as a method of transforming disturbed or underutilised sites into planted landscapes that mimic natural rocky habitats. Common examples include low-growing herbs, succulents, bellflowers, and other plants that naturally occur on rocky outcrops, cliffs, and stone walls.

== Habitat and adaptations ==
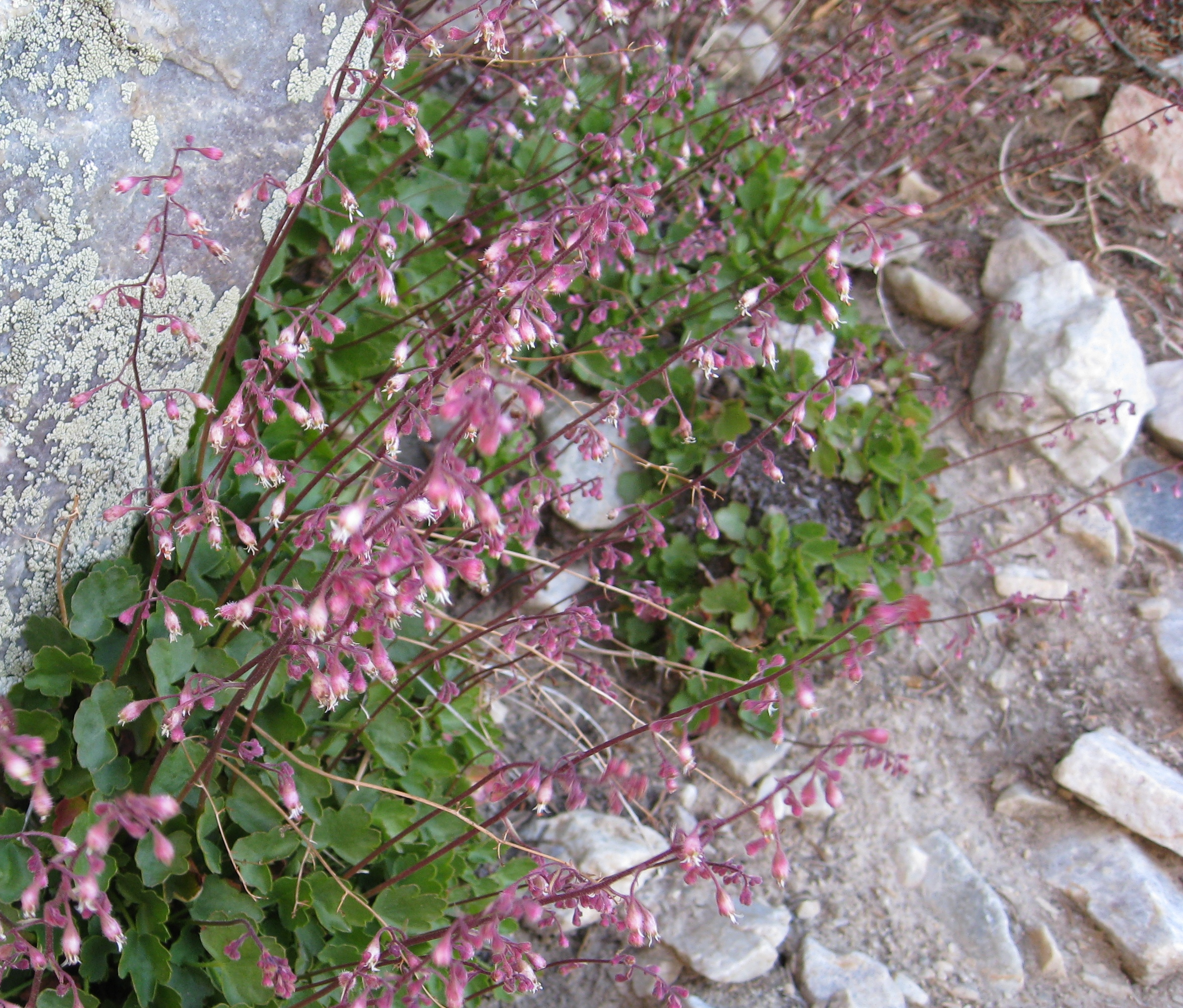
Heuchera rubescens in rock crack

Chasmophytes are specialised for life in rocky environments, often developing extensive root systems capable of penetrating deep into cracks to access water, nutrients, and accumulated organic matter. They occur in a wide range of habitats, including mountain cliffs, limestone outcrops, volcanic rock formations, coastal headlands, and artificial stone structures. They are adapted to survive in environments with limited water and nutrient availability. Research suggests that microorganisms associated with chasmophytes may contribute to their survival by promoting plant growth, facilitating nutrient acquisition, and enhancing rock weathering processes.

Chasmophytes may be found in both xeric and humid environments and include species from numerous plant groups, including ferns, succulents, shrubs, and flowering plants. Many possess adaptations that enable them to tolerate drought, temperature fluctuations, nutrient-poor substrates, and exposure to wind. Although some species are restricted to rocky habitats, others are facultative chasmophytes that can also grow in deeper soils. Microorganisms associated with chasmophytes may help these plants adapt to and survive in the water- and nutrient-limited conditions of rock crevices. Chasmophytic vegetation forms an important component of many cliff and rocky outcrop ecosystems and often supports specialised, endemic, and geographically restricted species.

Some authors have subdivided lithophytes into exolithophytes, which grow on rock surfaces, and chasmophytes (or chasmolithophytes), which grow in rock crevices and fissures. The Danish botanist Eugenius Warming was among the pioneers of plant ecology and examined the relationships between plants and their environments. In his 1909 book Plantesamfund, Warming discussed lithophytes as plants adapted to rocky habitats and described chasmophytes as plants rooted in rock clefts containing accumulated detritus. He also noted that lithophytes are capable of colonising steep, inclined, and exposed rock surfaces.

== Associated microorganisms ==
Such microorganisms have also attracted interest for their potential applications in developing sustainable approaches to improving drought tolerance and reducing water stress in crop plants. Research has found that some bacteria associated with chasmophytes exhibit tolerance to environmental stress and possess traits that promote plant growth. Experimental studies have shown that these microorganisms can improve drought tolerance, nutrient uptake, growth, and yield in crop plants under water-limited conditions. Such findings have led to interest in the potential use of chasmophyte-associated bacteria in sustainable agriculture to help reduce the effects of water stress and improve crop productivity. Studies of bacteria associated with chasmophytes have found that they often possess traits that promote plant growth and enhance tolerance to environmental stress.

Research on bacterial communities isolated from chasmophytic plants in the Ladakh region of India found that many strains were capable of improving nutrient availability, producing plant-growth-promoting compounds, and tolerating extremes of pH, salinity, temperature, and drought. Researchers have suggested that such microorganisms may contribute to the survival of chasmophytes in water- and nutrient-limited rock crevice environments and may have potential applications in sustainable agriculture.

== Cultivation and gardening ==
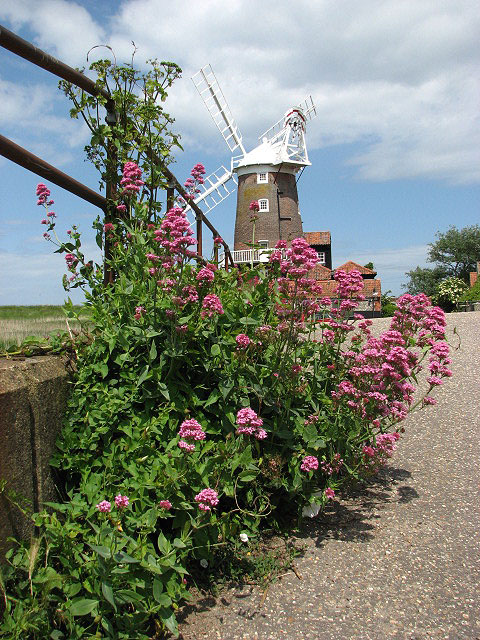
Centranthus ruber growing in a rock crevice, a habitat that provides access to deeper soil, moisture, and nutrients.

Gardening writers have noted that many plants are well adapted to growing in cracks, crevices, walls, and paving joints where soil is shallow and moisture is limited. Such habitats favour species capable of tolerating drought, restricted root space, and nutrient-poor conditions. Gardening writers have also noted that paths and paved surfaces containing gaps, cracks, and soil-filled crevices can provide opportunities for cultivating small, low-growing plants. These plants may spread along the joints between paving stones, softening the appearance of hard landscaping, creating a weathered or naturalistic effect, and in some cases releasing fragrance when stepped on. Similar planting opportunities can be created by removing deteriorated mortar or cement from existing paving and replacing it with soil or compost.

Cracks and joints in patios and paving can accumulate soil, compost, and organic matter over time, allowing a variety of plants to establish themselves. Species such as forget-me-nots, Mexican fleabane, watercress, celery, lamb's lettuce, and mosses may colonise these spaces naturally. While some gardeners remove such growth through sweeping, weeding, or cleaning, others regard paving cracks as opportunities for cultivation. Horticultural sources have recommended species adapted to shallow, dry substrates which can soften the appearance of hard landscaping, provide seasonal colour and fragrance, and create a more naturalistic aesthetic. Variations in rock type, slope, drainage, and soil chemistry can be incorporated into their design to replicate a wide range of natural environments and plant habitats. Some projects have utilised recycled materials, such as broken concrete, arranged to resemble natural rock strata and create crevices, planting pockets, and microclimates.

A crevice garden is a style of rock garden designed to mimic natural rocky habitats through the use of thin, upright slabs of stone, such as slate or sandstone, arranged to create narrow planting crevices. The soil-filled crevices provide drainage and growing conditions similar to those found in natural rock fissures, allowing roots to penetrate deeply between the rocks and making crevice gardens particularly suitable for many alpine and saxicolous plants. Depending on their orientation and exposure, crevice gardens can support either sun-loving or shade-tolerant species. Crevice gardens are inspired by naturally occurring geological formations created through processes such as mountain building, weathering, and erosion. Modern crevice gardening involves the use of upright or angled rocks arranged to create narrow gaps in which alpine and other rock-adapted plants can be grown. A key principle of crevice gardening is to replicate natural rocky habitats, creating arrangements that resemble naturally occurring outcrops and fissures. These gardens typically employ free-draining, low-nutrient substrates and are planted with drought-tolerant, low-growing species adapted to rocky environments. Advocates argue that crevice gardens can reduce maintenance requirements, reuse construction waste, increase habitat diversity, and recreate the appearance of natural alpine, coastal, or rocky landscapes.

== Examples ==
Examples of chasmophytes include:

- Asarina procumbens
- Campanula portenschlagiana (wall bellflower)
- Campanula poscharskyana (trailing bellflower)
- Corydalis lutea
- Delosperma ‘Fire Spinner’
- Echeveria agavoides ‘Lipstick’
- Erigeron karvinskianus (Mexican fleabane)
- Erinus alpinus
- Ficus vasta
- Hypericum aciferum
- Hypericum decaisneanum
- Lamprocapnos spectabilis
- Leycesteria formosa
- Matricaria chamomilla (camomile)
- Mentha pulegium (pennyroyal)
- Mentha requienii (Corsican mint)
- Oreocarya cana
- Oscularia deltoides (Pink Ice Plant)
- Saxifraga crustata
- Scabiosa solymica
- Sedum kamtschaticum
- Sedum rubrotinctum ‘Aurora’
- Sempervivum
- Soleirolia soleirolii ("mind-your-own-business")
- Telesonix jamesii
- Thymus serpyllum (creeping thyme)

== Gallery ==
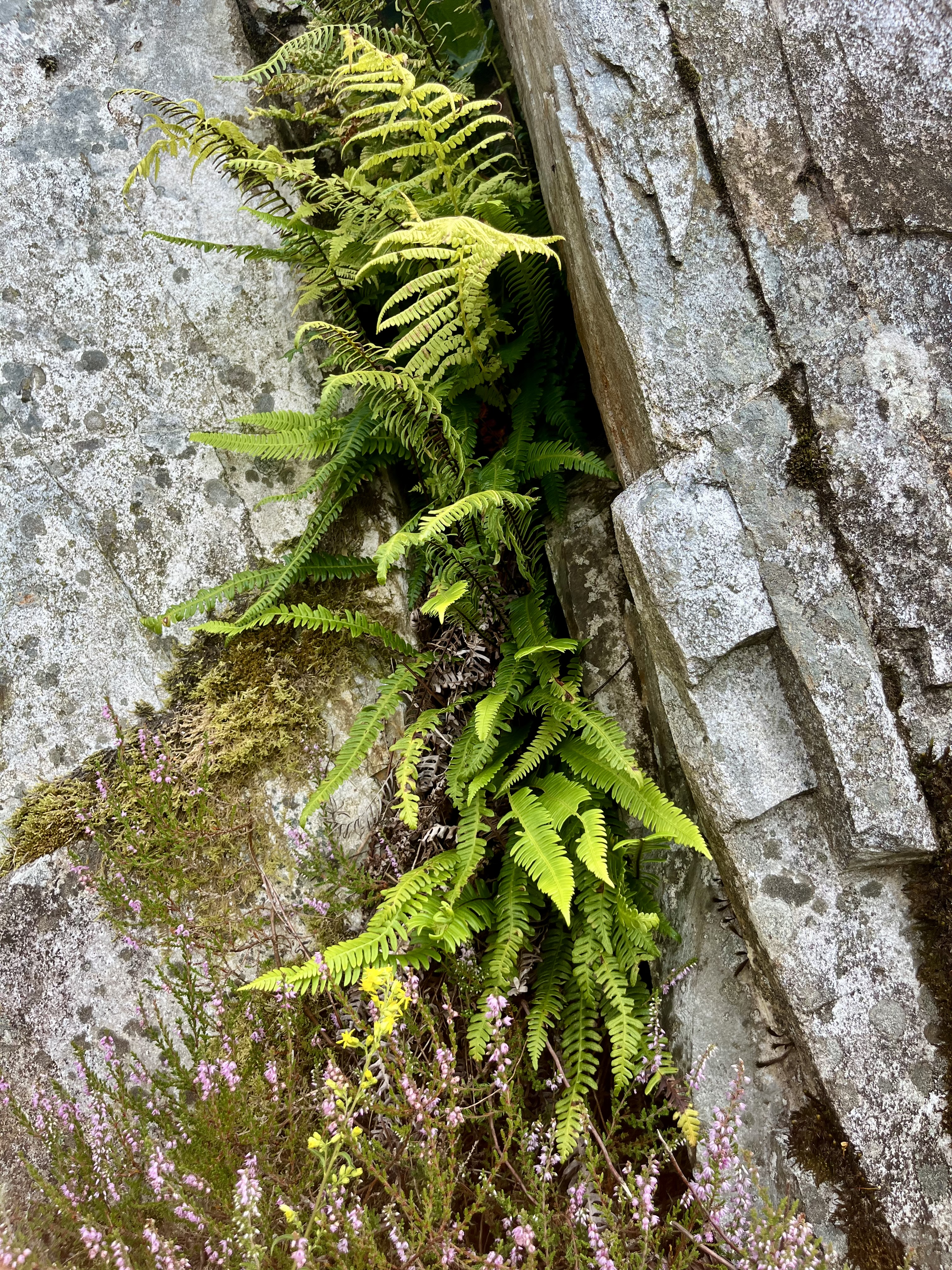
Struthiopteris spicant growing from a crevice in Wales, UK

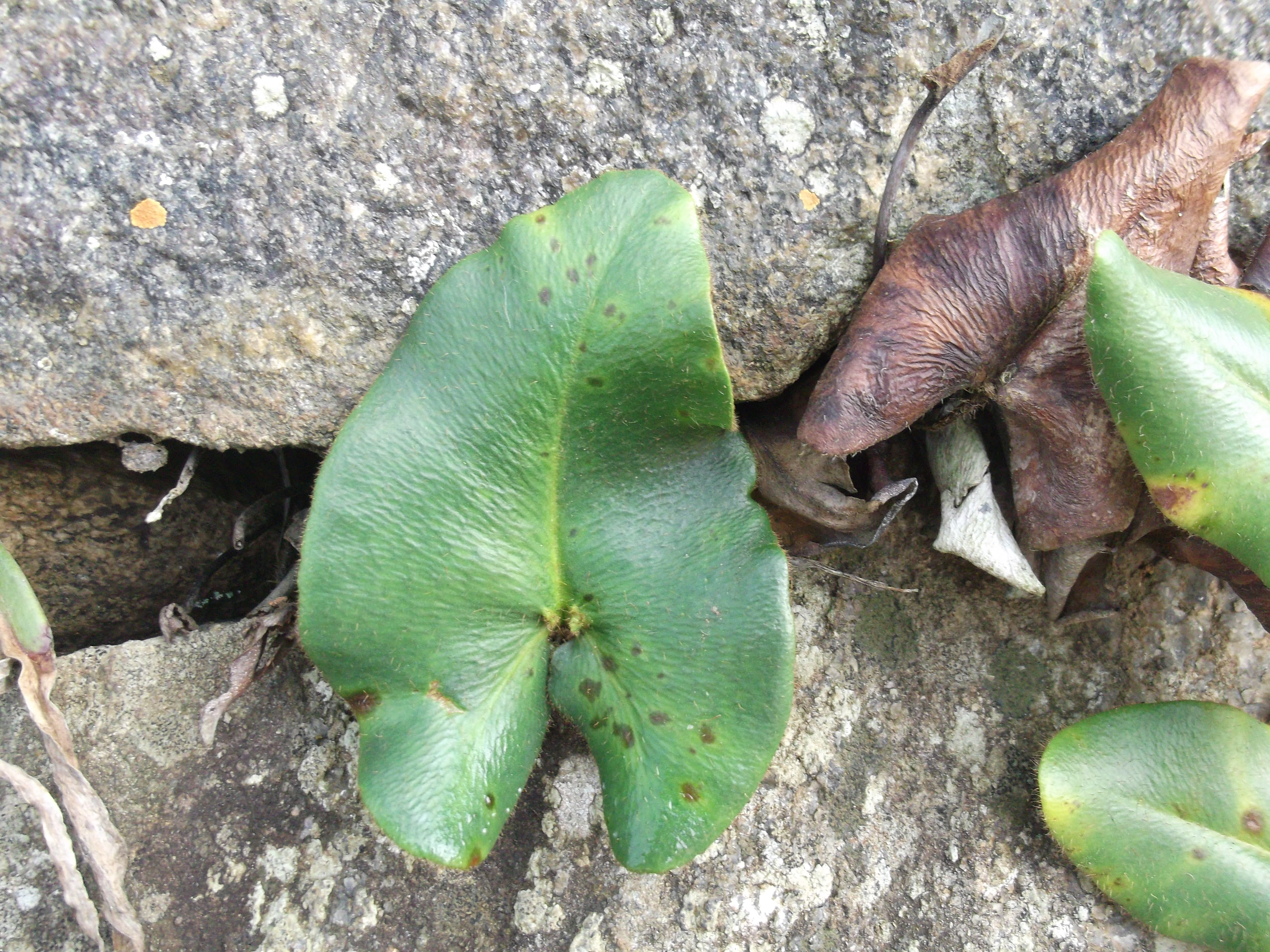
Parahemionitis arifolia in Yercaud, India

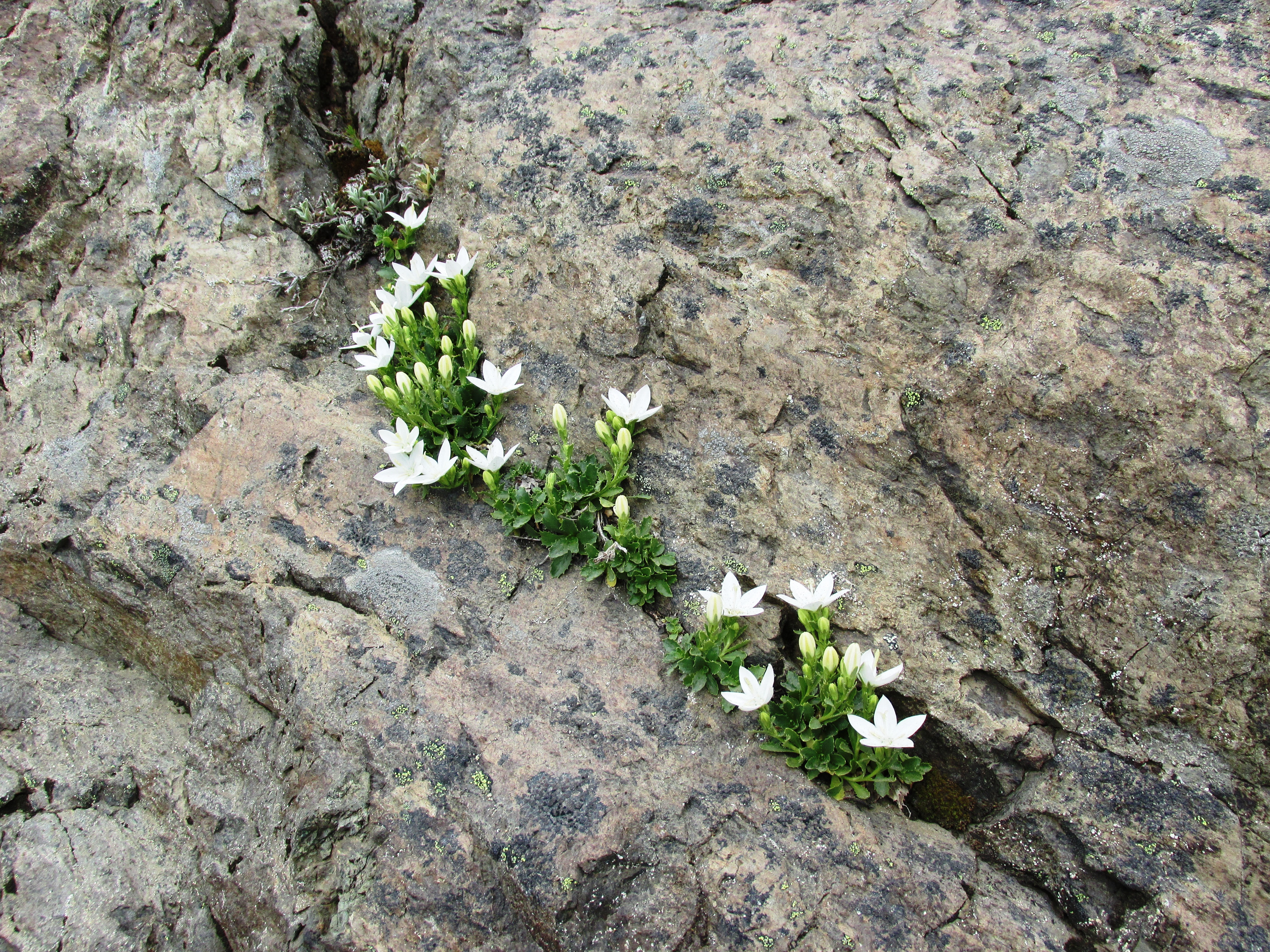
Campanula piperi on rock crevices, Olympic National Park

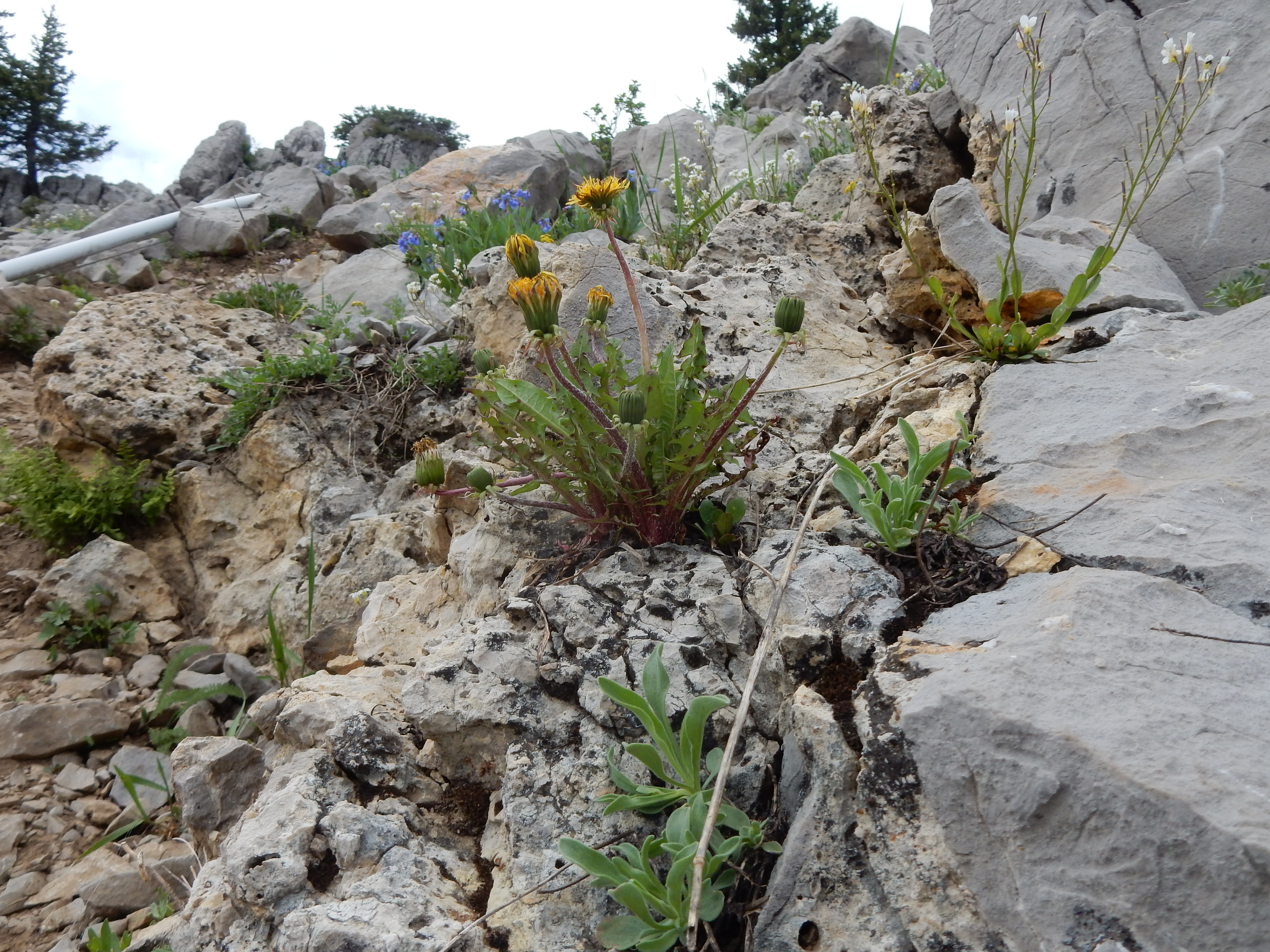
Common dandelion prospering in the limestone crevices and cracks in the Bridger Range

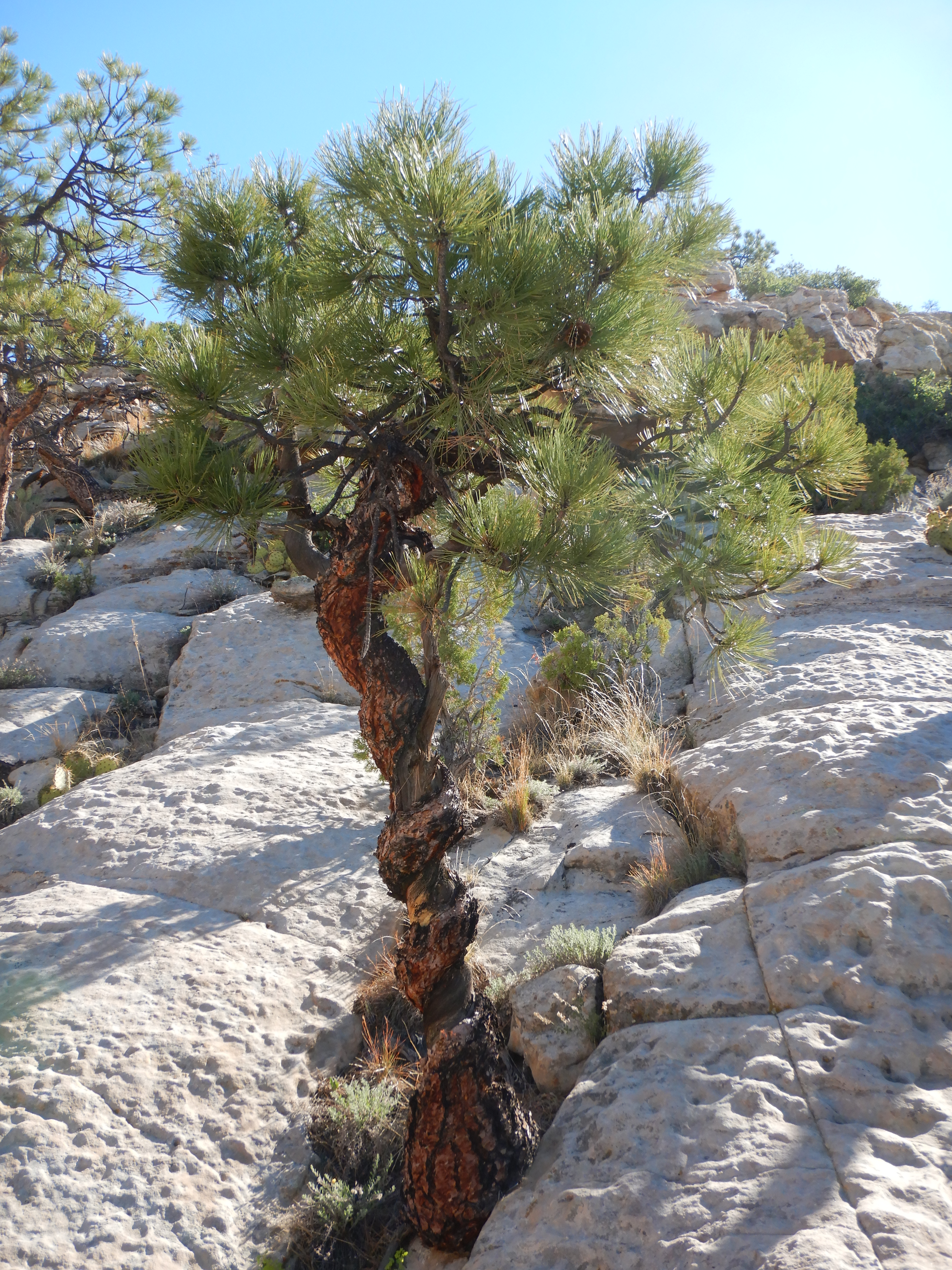
Ponderosa Pine growing in rock crevices in the Sandoval County, New Mexico.

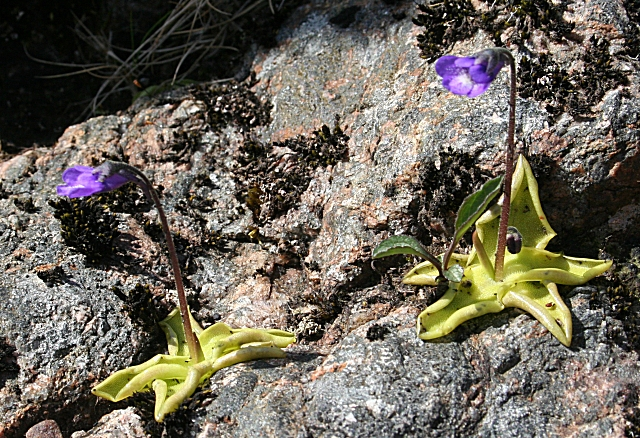
Pinguicula vulgaris, growing in a crevice in the rocks

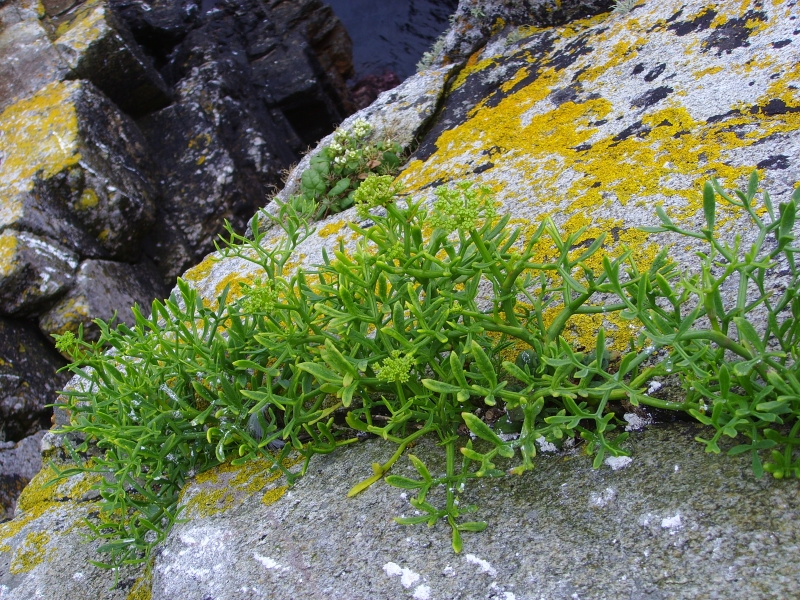
Crithmum maritimum growing on a crevice in Brittany, France

== See also ==
- Epibiont
- Epiphyte
- Endosymbiont
- Epiphytic fungus
- Epiphytic bacteria
- Foliicolous
