= Biokovo Nature Park =

Nature park in Croatia

Coordinates: 43.33°N 17.06°E

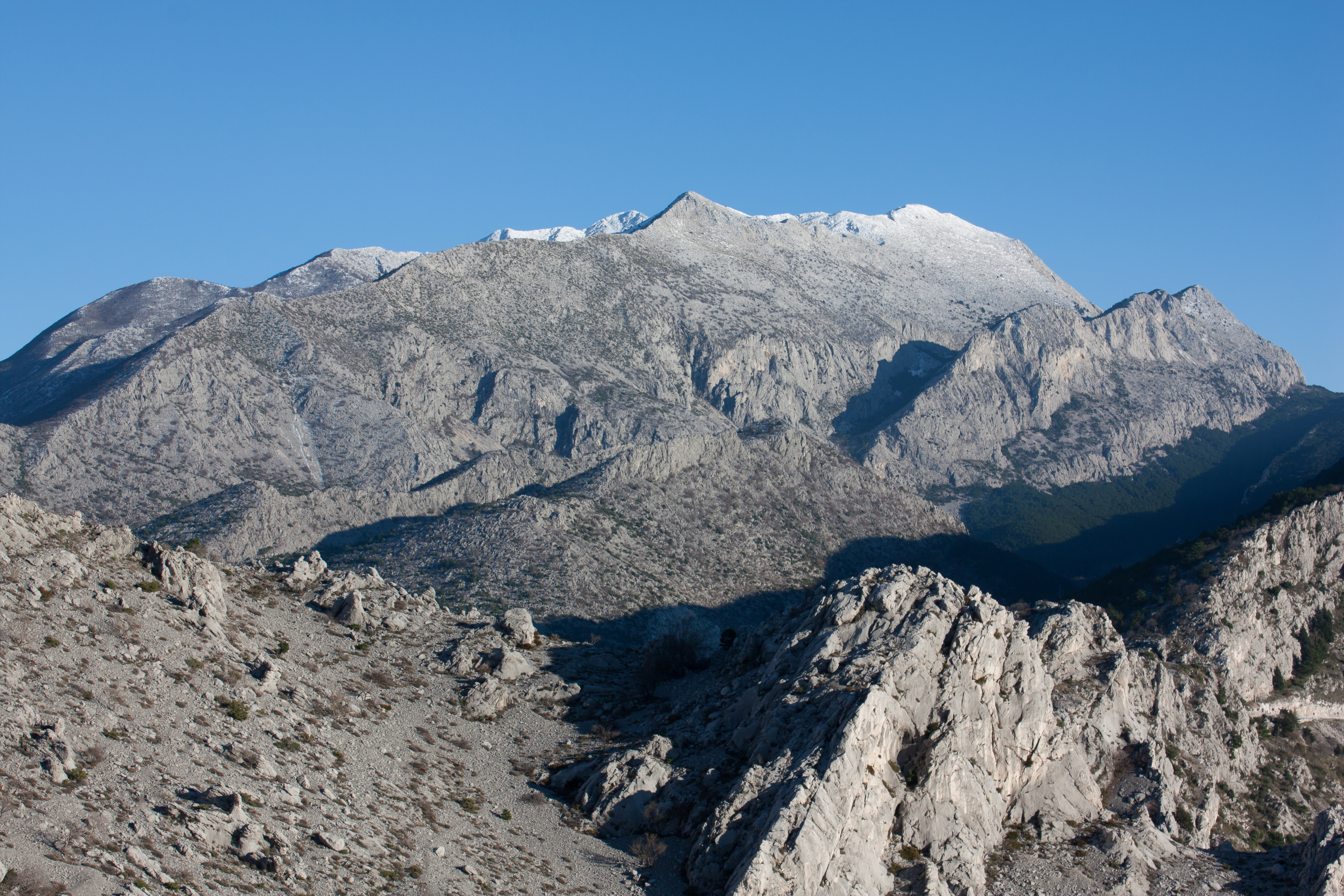
Landscape in the higher parts of the nature park

Biokovo Nature Park is located on the southern Dalmatian coast. Proclaimed a nature park in 1981, this mountain rampart towers about 1500 meters over the Makarska Riviera and offers views over the sea and nearby islands. It is one of Croatia's most popular destinations for hikers with myriad paths that wind up the hills past olive groves, vineyards and pine forests. The Biokovo massif, which stretches 36 kilometers along the coast and nine kilometers inland, drops down in a series of limestone rocks and cliffs interspersed with caves, pits and sinkholes. The most popular hiking and mountaineering destination is Vosac (1421 meters) which lies only 2.5 kilometers from Makarska.

The Nature Park covers an area of 19,550 hectares and its highest point is Sveti Jure (1762 meters).

Due to its relative isolation, the nature park hosts endemic plant species such as the Biokovo bellflower. The Kotisina Botanical Garden is also in the region (located 3 kilometers from Makarska).

Part of the Zabiokovlje is in the Biokovo Nature Park.

== Geology ==
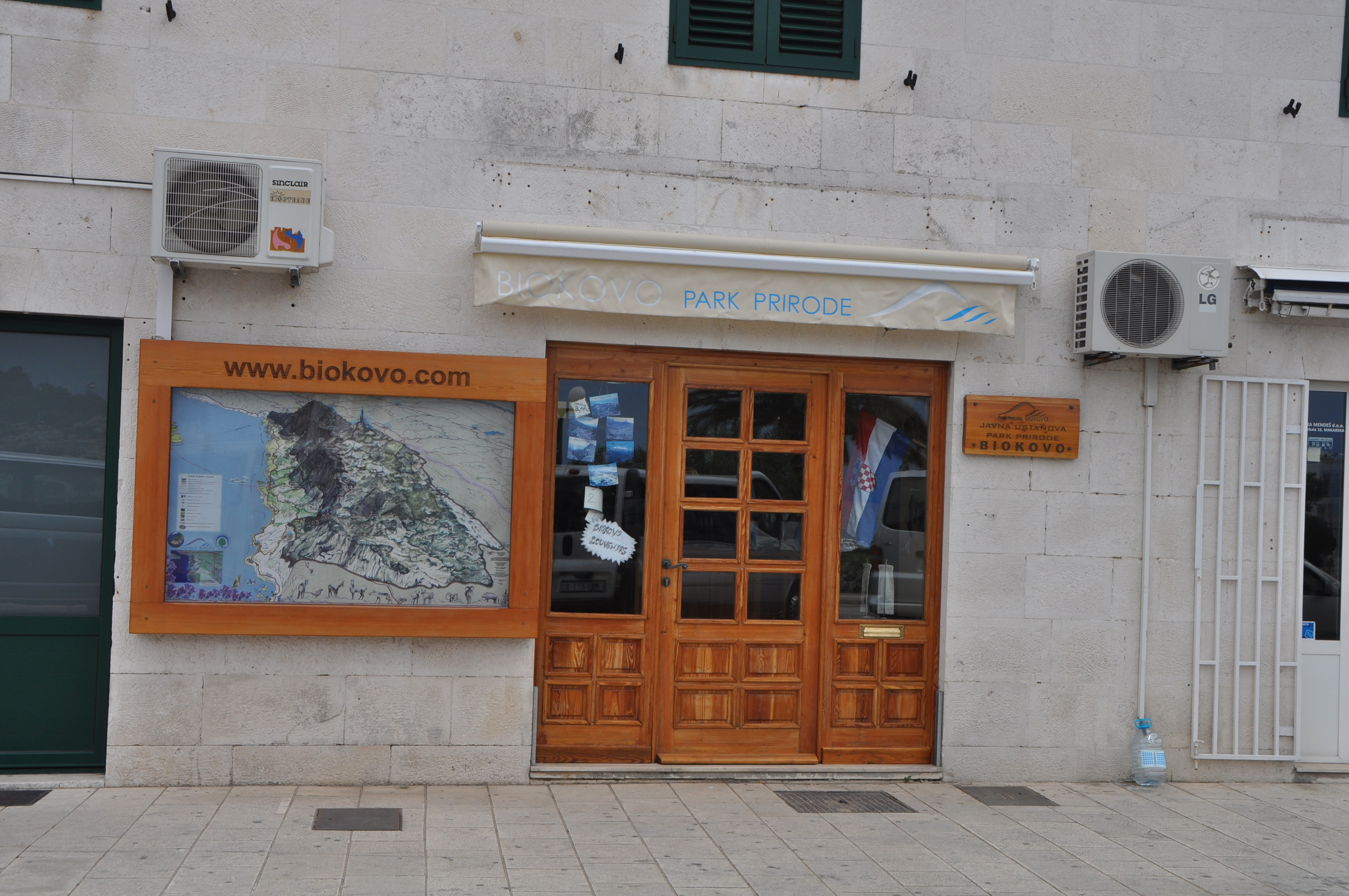
Visitors center in Makarska

At the end of the Cretaceous era, about 65 million years ago, the African Plate began colliding with the Eurasian Plate. The narrowing of the ocean caused tectonic disturbances, making the horizontal layers of plates crinkle, break, and emerge above the sea surface, forming mountain ranges including the Alps and the Dinarides, which Biokovo belongs to. As a result, the ancient ocean Tethys has largely disappeared; what remains of it is the current Mediterranean Sea.

The material in the lower parts towards the sea and on the opposite Zagorje side is mainly made up of Eocene Flysch sediments, while the higher parts are shaped into carbonate sedimentary rocks.

== Vegetation ==
The vegetation in the Biokovo Nature Park is a mixture of the oldest Mediterranean, Boreal, and Central newer floral elements, which include drypis spinosa, moltkia petraea, salvia officinalis, lilium martagon, campanula portenschlagiana, edraianthus pumilio, and pines (Dalmatian black pine, Aleppo pine).
