= Amfora Pit =

Coordinates: 43°20′48.5″N 17°02′48″E

Amfora is a pit on Biokovo Mountain, in Biokovo Nature Park. The entry to the cave is in the upper parts of the mountain, c. 1000 meters from Sv. Jure peak, on the southeast slope of one of many pits of Biokovo.

It was discovered in 1998, by speleo-alpine club Ekstrem (Makarska).

Cavers from SAK Ekstrem, SO Velebit, SO Željezničar, SO Dubovac, SD Matokit, SD Krstatice made a first mini-expedition in the pit Amfora between 13 and 15 October 2000.

Further exploration was conducted through 2001 and 2002. After four years of exploration, Croatian expedition "Amfora 2002" reached the depth of -788 m. Experts collected biological material from the pit.

== See also ==
- List of Dinaric caves
