= Rilić =

Rilić may refer to:

- Rilić, Kupres, a village near Kupres, Bosnia
- Rilić (mountain), a mountain south of Biokovo, Croatia
