= Vidova gora =

Highest peak on Brač, Croatia

Coordinates: 43°16′46.9″N 16°37′11.2″E

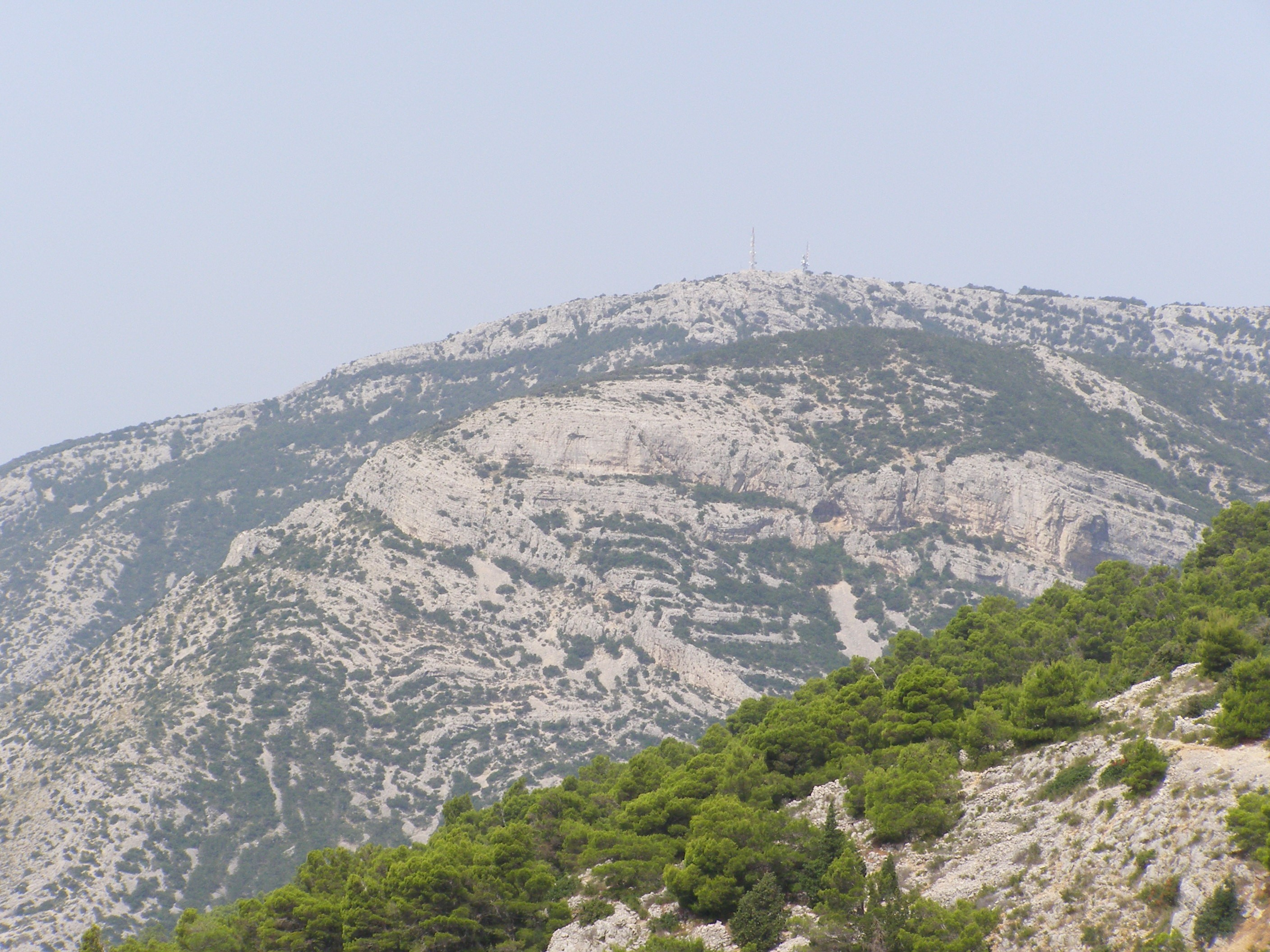
- View of Vidova gora

Highest point
- Elevation: 780 m (2,560 ft)
- Prominence: 778 m (2,552 ft)

Geography

Vidova gora (780 m.a.s.l., some sources say 778m) is the highest peak on the Croatian island of Brač, and also the highest peak on all Adriatic islands. It is situated above the village of Bol. The name translates as Mount St. Vitus into English.

== Mountain hut ==
In the 1935–1936 season, the mountain shelter, at 778 metres (2,552 ft) in elevation, was under construction. In the 1936–1937 season, it saw 366 visitors, including 14 Czechoslovak, 8 German and 2 Austrian citizens. In the 1937–1938 season it saw 956 visitors, including 421 Czech, 137 Austrian, 76 German, 14 Italian and 12 English citizens, overtaking Aleksandrov dom on Vošac (Biokovo) as the most visited HPS mountain hut by foreigners.

== Sources ==
- Brač – vrh Vidova gora (in Croatian)
