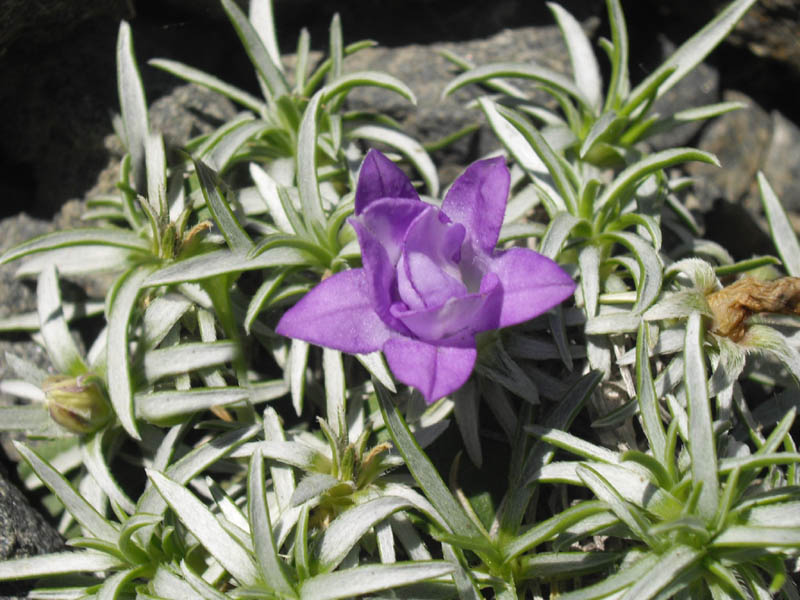

Scientific classification
- Kingdom: Plantae
- Clade: Tracheophytes
- Clade: Angiosperms
- Clade: Eudicots
- Clade: Asterids
- Order: Asterales
- Family: Campanulaceae
- Genus: Edraianthus
- Species: E. pumilio

Binomial name
- Edraianthus pumilio (Port. ex Schult.) A.DC.

Synonyms
- Campanopsis pumilio (Port. ex Schult.) Kuntze; Campanula graminifolia var. linearifolia Vuk.; Campanula pumilio Port. ex Schult. (1819) (basionym); Campanula silenifolia Host; Wahlenbergia pumilio (Port. ex Schult.) A.DC.; Wahlenbergia pumilorum G.Nicholson

= Edraianthus pumilio =

Species of flowering plant

Edraianthus pumilio, the silvery dwarf harebell or Biokovo bellflower, is a species of flowering plant in the family Campanulaceae, native to the Biokovo mountains of Dalmatia in southern Croatia. It is an herbaceous perennial growing to 2.5 cm (1 in), forming a cushion of hairy, silvery-green leaves and bearing solitary violet upturned bell-shaped flowers in summer. It requires extremely free-draining, preferably alkaline, soil, and is best grown in an alpine garden or rockery.

The Latin specific epithet pumilio means "small in stature".

It has gained the Royal Horticultural Society's Award of Garden Merit.
