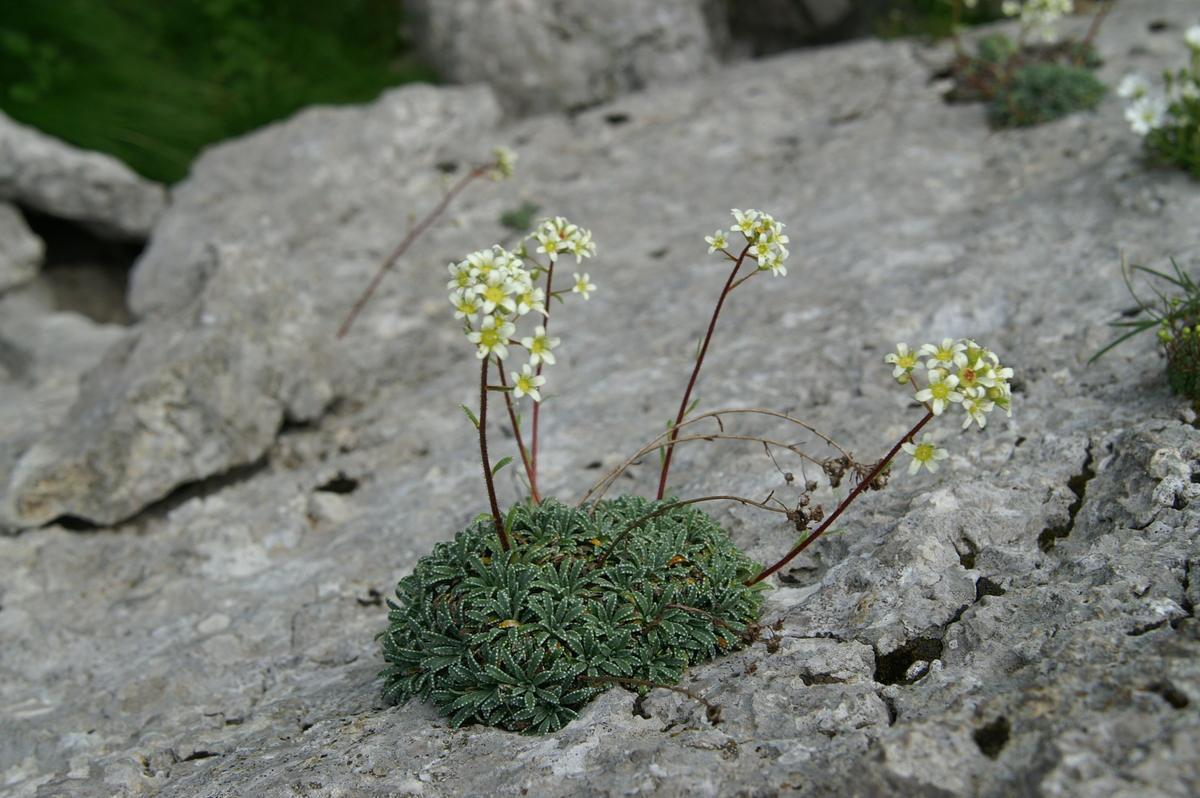

Scientific classification
- Kingdom: Plantae
- Clade: Tracheophytes
- Clade: Angiosperms
- Clade: Eudicots
- Order: Saxifragales
- Family: Saxifragaceae
- Genus: Saxifraga
- Species: S. crustata

Binomial name
- Saxifraga crustata Vest

Synonyms
- Saxifraga cotyledon var. incrustata Vest.; Saxifraga crustacea Hoppe.; Saxifraga kerneri Beck.; Saxifraga incrustata Vest.

= Saxifraga crustata =

Species of plant

Saxifraga crustata, the crusted-leaved saxifraga and silver saxifrage, as well as encrusted saxifrage, is an evergreen perennial plant species in the family Saxifragaceae, native to the Eastern Alps. This species was described by Austrian botanist Lorenz Chrysanth von Vest in 1804.

== Etymology ==
While the genus name refers to the plant's ability to erode and break rocks while growing and spreading around (hence saxum means "rock" and frangere is translated as "to break" from Latin), its species' name comes from the Latin term crustatus or "encrusted", referring to the plant's shiny green leaves that have their surface covered with drops of crusty lime, secreted from special pores, located on the leaf margins.

== Description ==
Saxifraga crustata is an evergreen and perennial plant species that grows in dense mats of medium-sized plants and can reach from 12 to 24 centimetres of height. Its narrow and linear leaves that are green and have silver glow are usually arranged into rosettes.

Silver shine of leaves is a consequence of small amounts of lime, more precisely calcite (a common polymorph of calcium carbonate), which is secreted by the plant's leaf margins, where secreting pores consisting of hydathode tissue are located. Similar calcium carbonate excretion is exhibited by many other Saxifraga species, but not all of them secrete calcite (some excrete vaterite, while a few species' excrement consists of both calcite and vaterite).

Ordinary looking flowers have long yellowish-white to cream white petals and are united into panicles, which represent the terminal end of an intensively red coloured stems that bear no leaves. This plant species flowers between June and August.

== Distribution ==
Saxifraga crustata occurs in the European Alps, including in Slovenia, Austria, Croatia and Italy. Populations of this plant species are found in the Dolomites and the Dinarides, ranging from Slovenia to Montenegro. In Slovenia Saxifraga crustata is a relatively common plant species that grows in the Alps, as well as Trnovo Forest Plateau and the Snežnik mountain plateau.

This plant is classified as a chasmophyte species, with its habitat typically consisting of rock screes and similar surfaces.

== Gallery ==
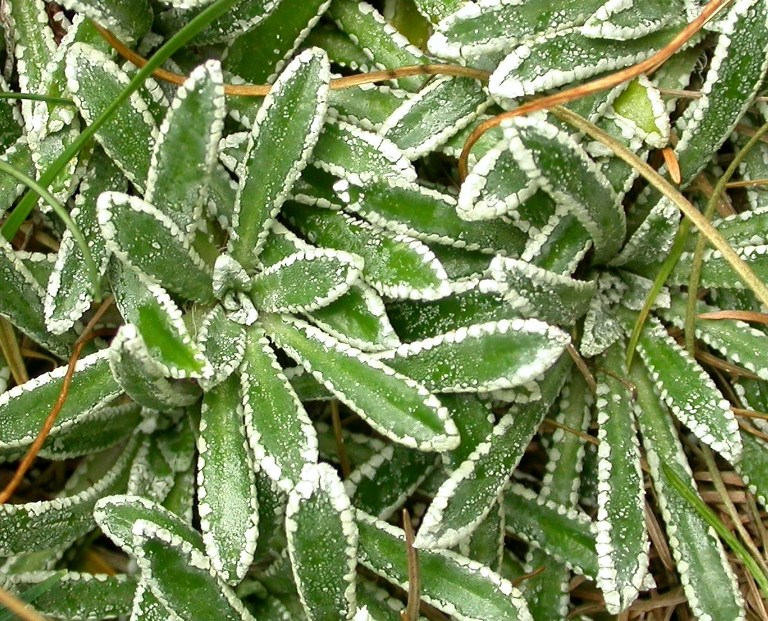

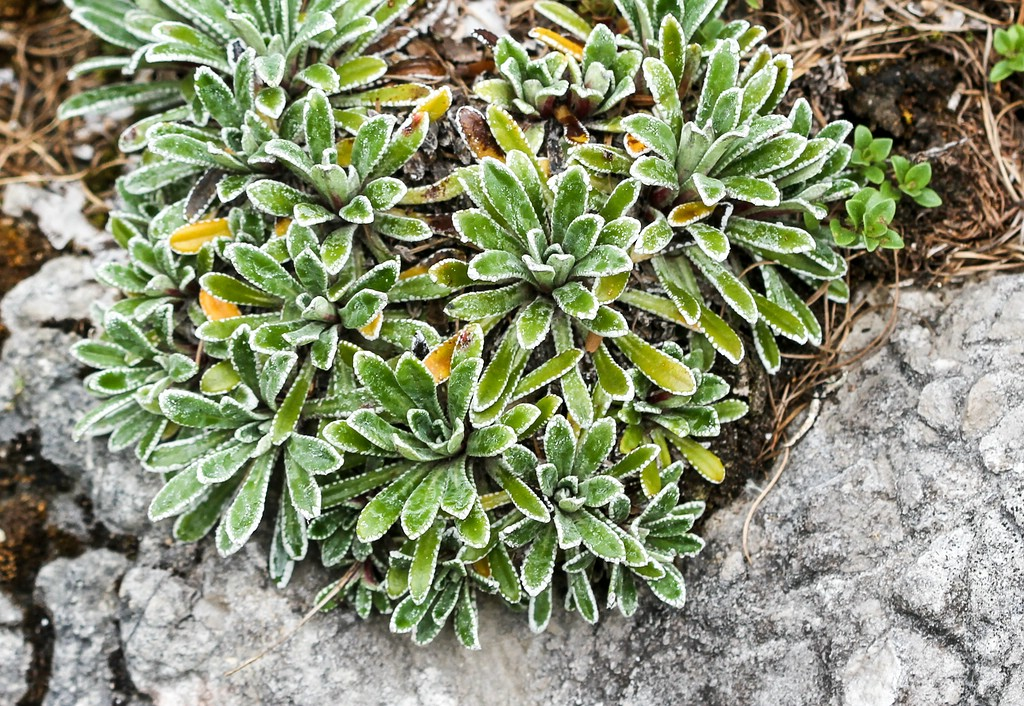

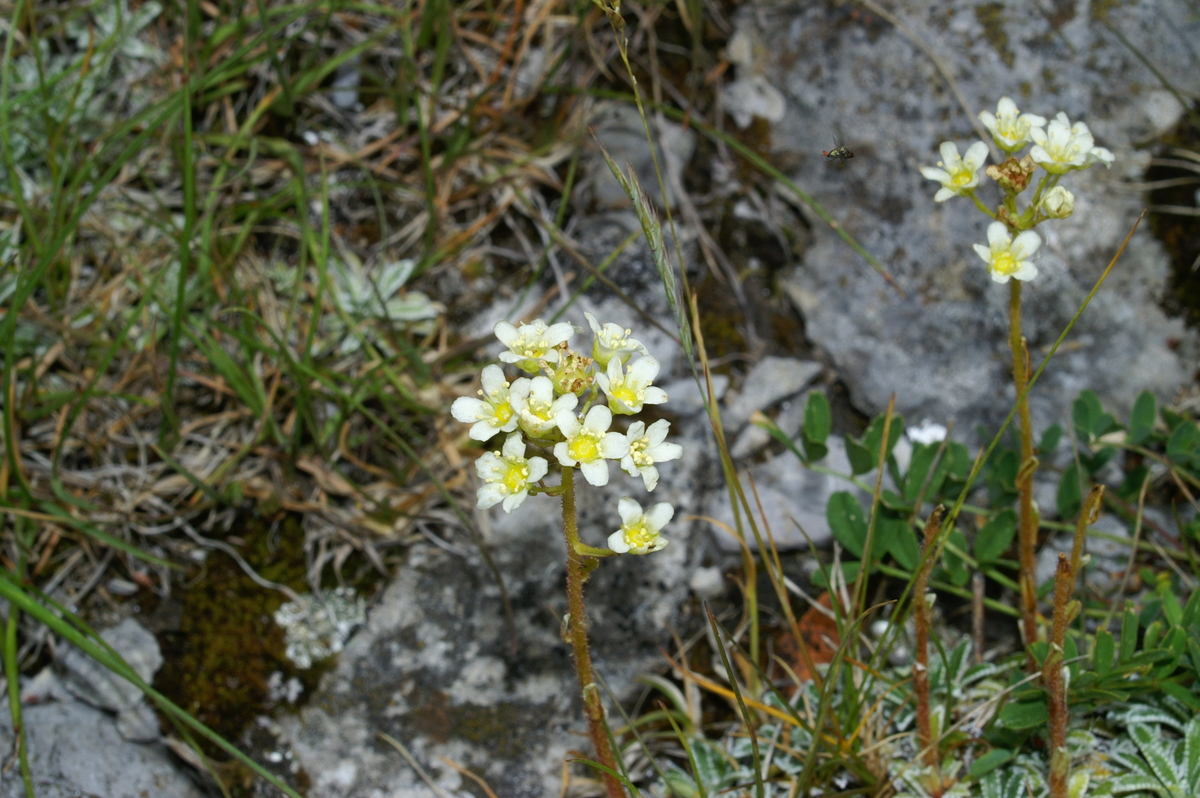

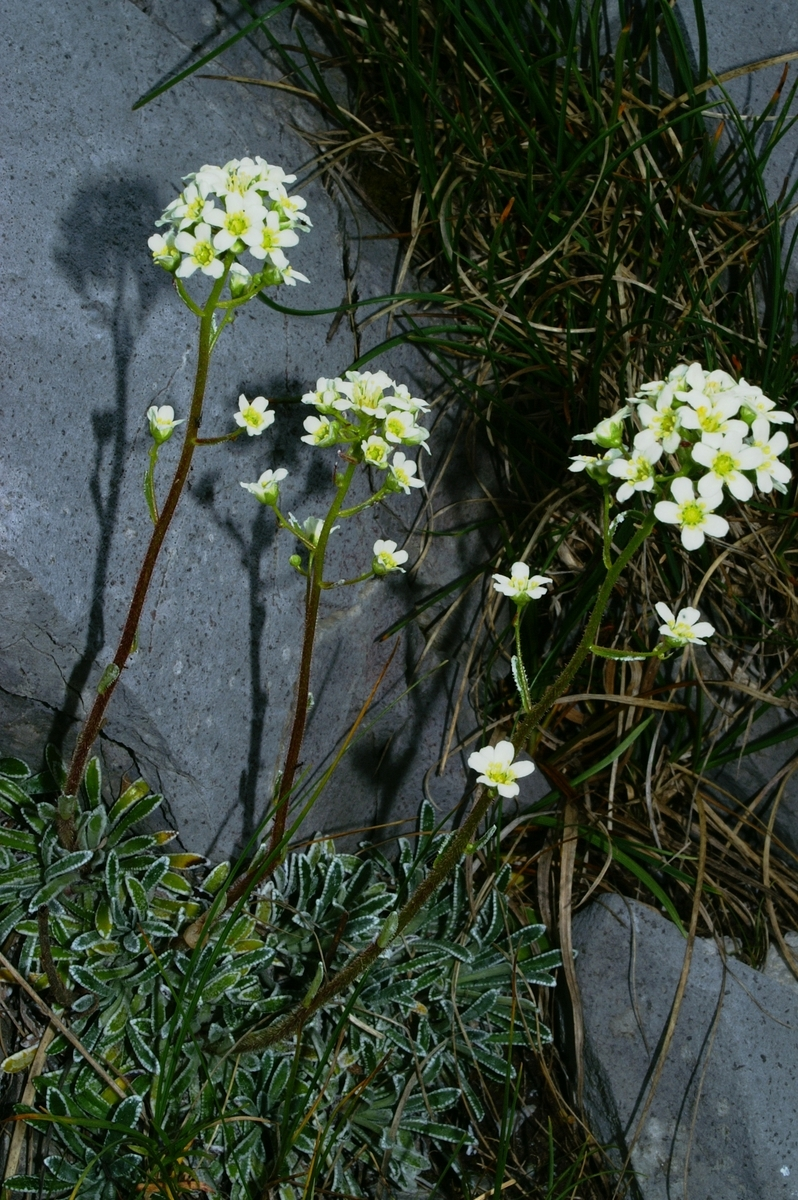

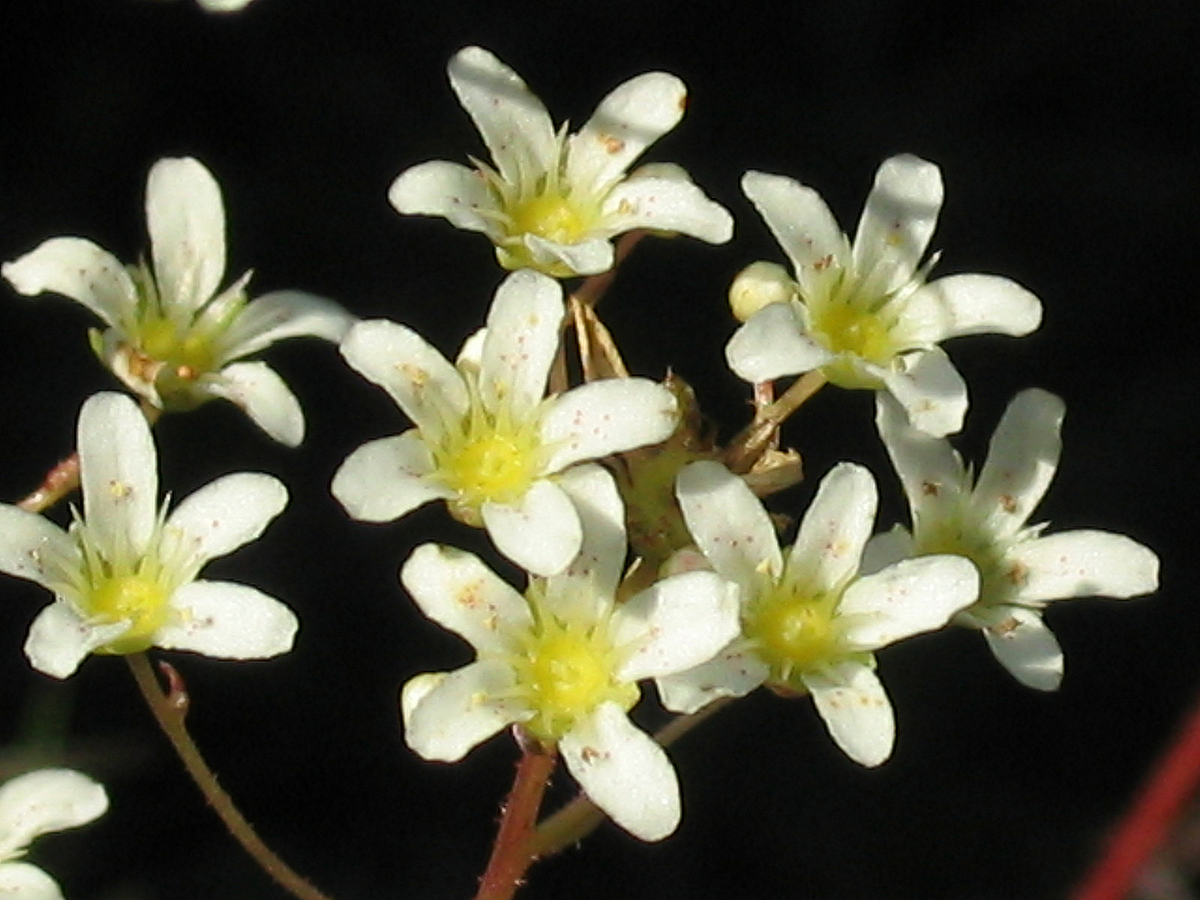

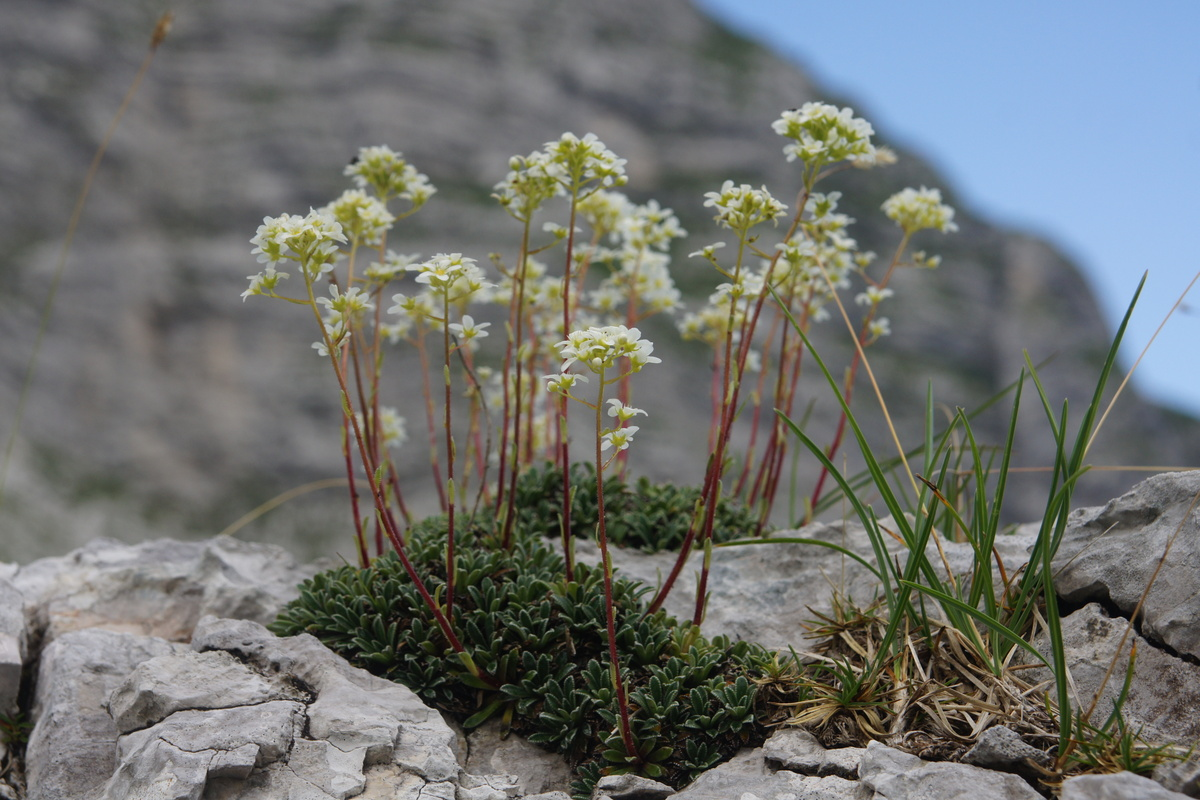

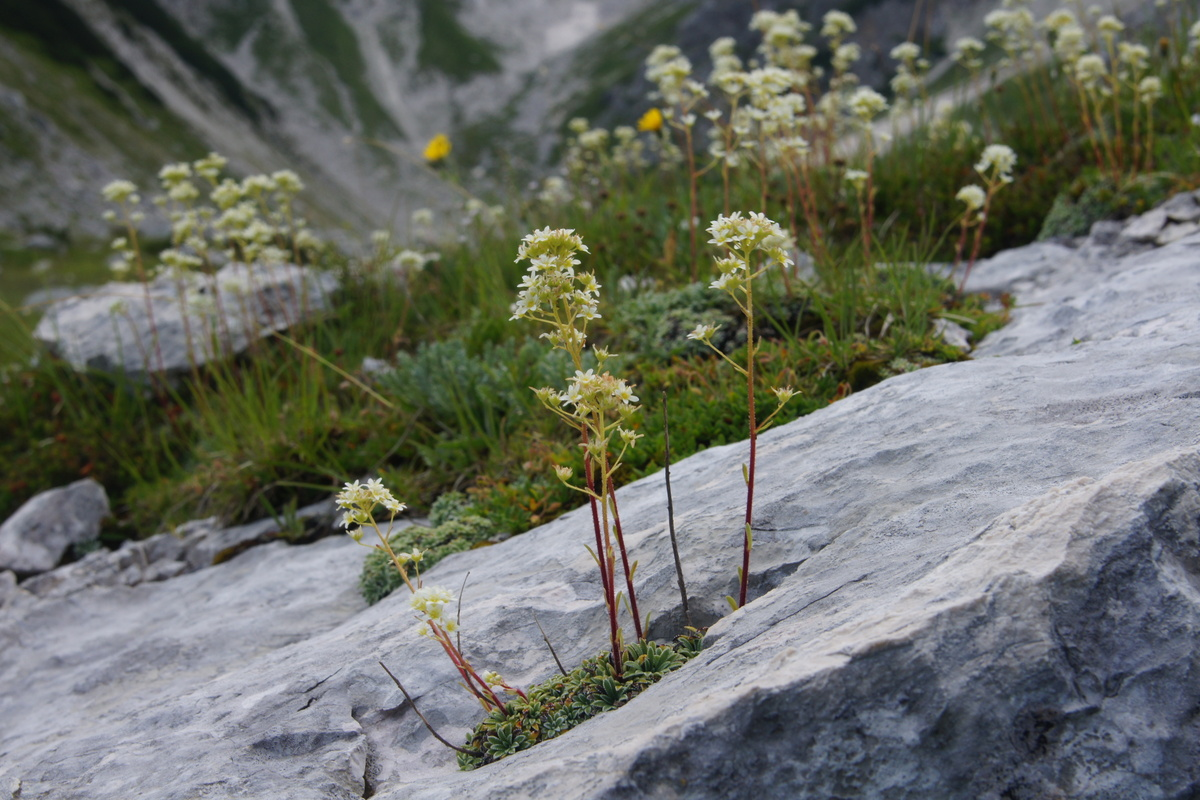

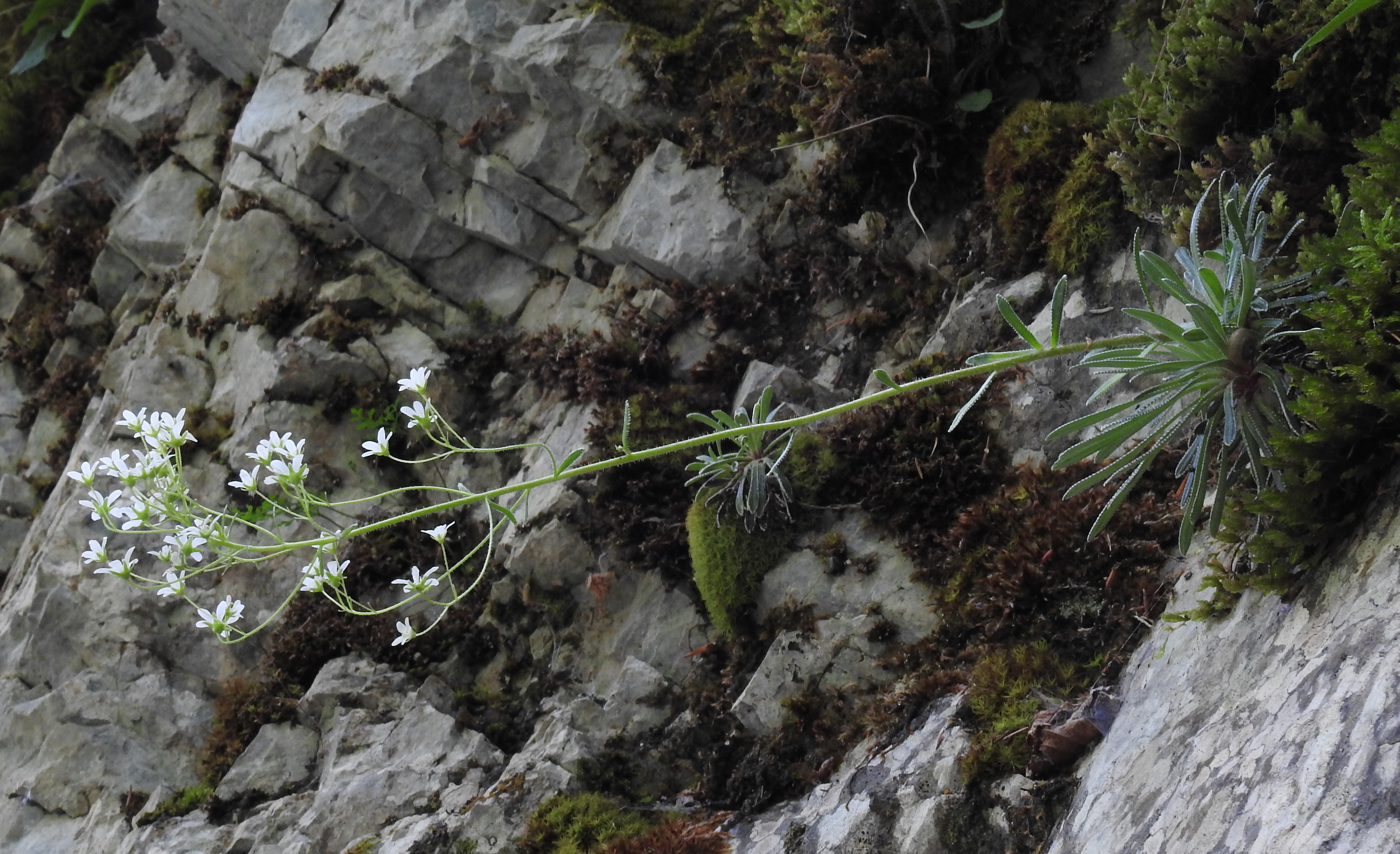
