= Šibenik (mountain) =

- Location within Croatia

Highest point
- Elevation: 1,314 m (4,311 ft)
- Coordinates: 43°16′34″N 17°15′29″E

Geography
- Location: Croatia

Šibenik is a mountain in inland Dalmatia, Croatia. Its highest peak is Veliki Šibenik at 1,314 m.a.s.l. It is located west of Vrgorac and east of Biokovo.
