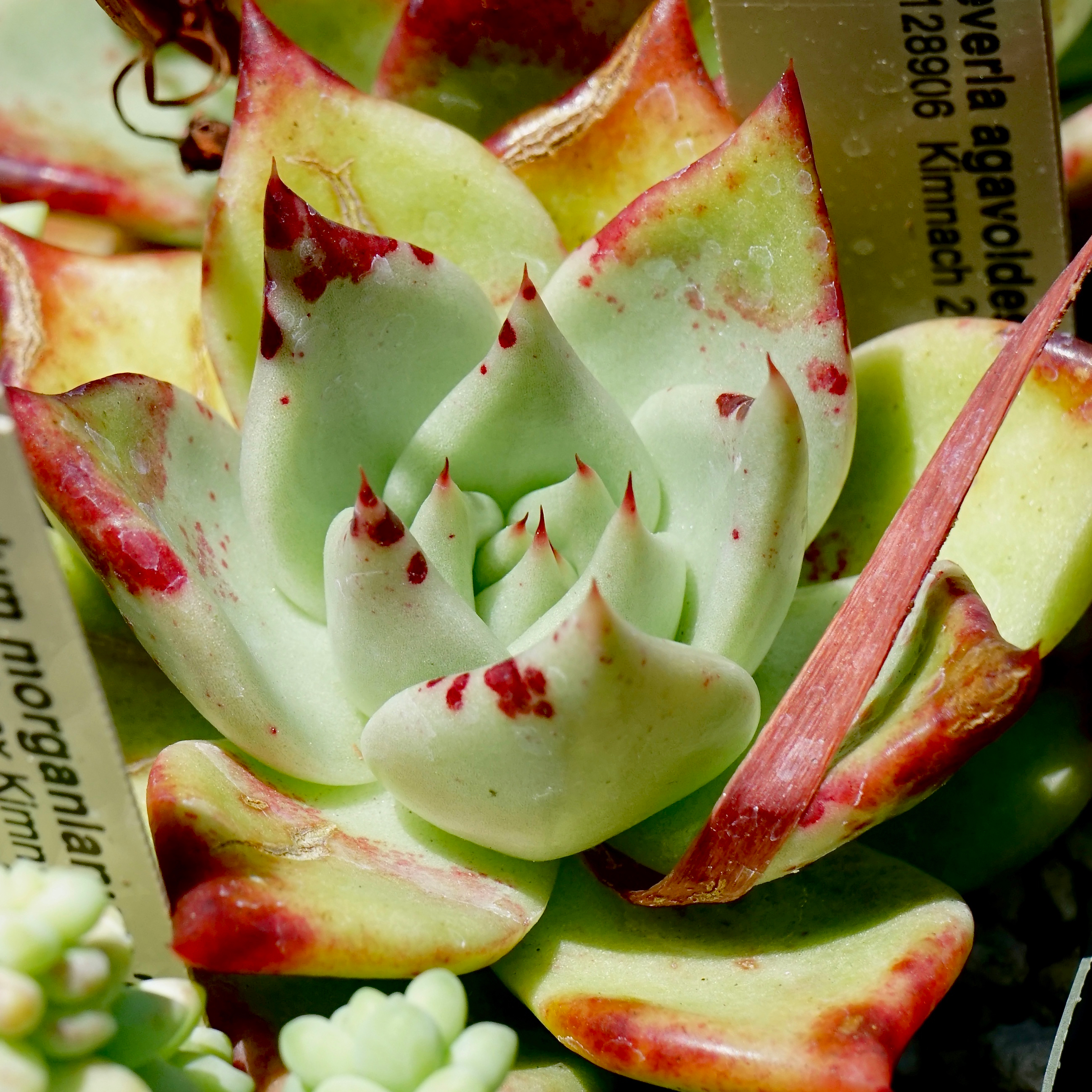

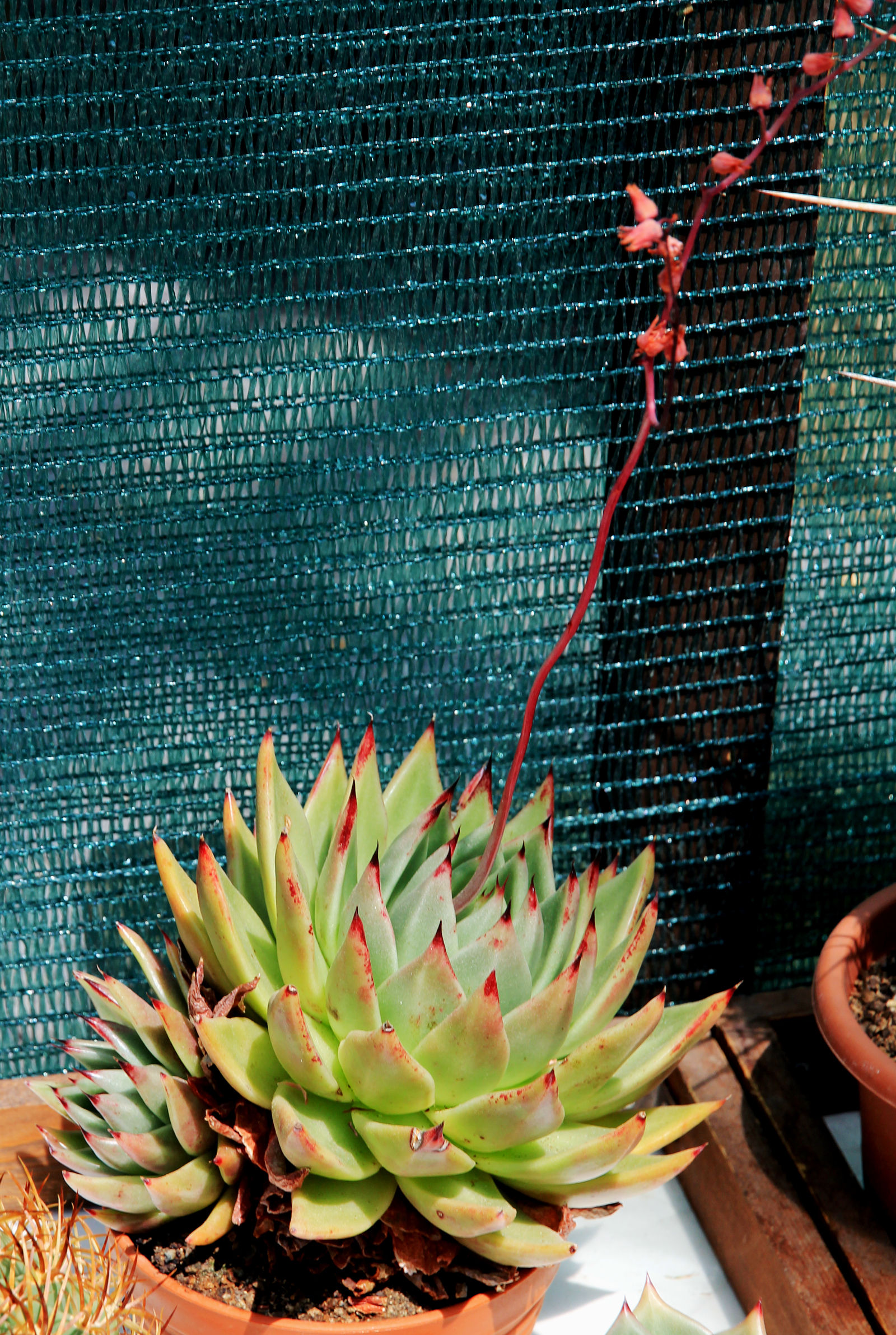
- Lower photo: from Prague, Czech Repub.

Scientific classification
- Kingdom: Plantae
- Clade: Tracheophytes
- Clade: Angiosperms
- Clade: Eudicots
- Order: Saxifragales
- Family: Crassulaceae
- Genus: Echeveria
- Species: E. agavoides

Binomial name
- Echeveria agavoides Lem.

Synonyms
- Cotyledon agavoides Baker; Echeveria obscura (Rose) A.Berger; Echeveria yuccoides É.Morren; Urbinia agavoides (Lem.) Rose; Urbinia obscura Rose

= Echeveria agavoides =

Species of succulent

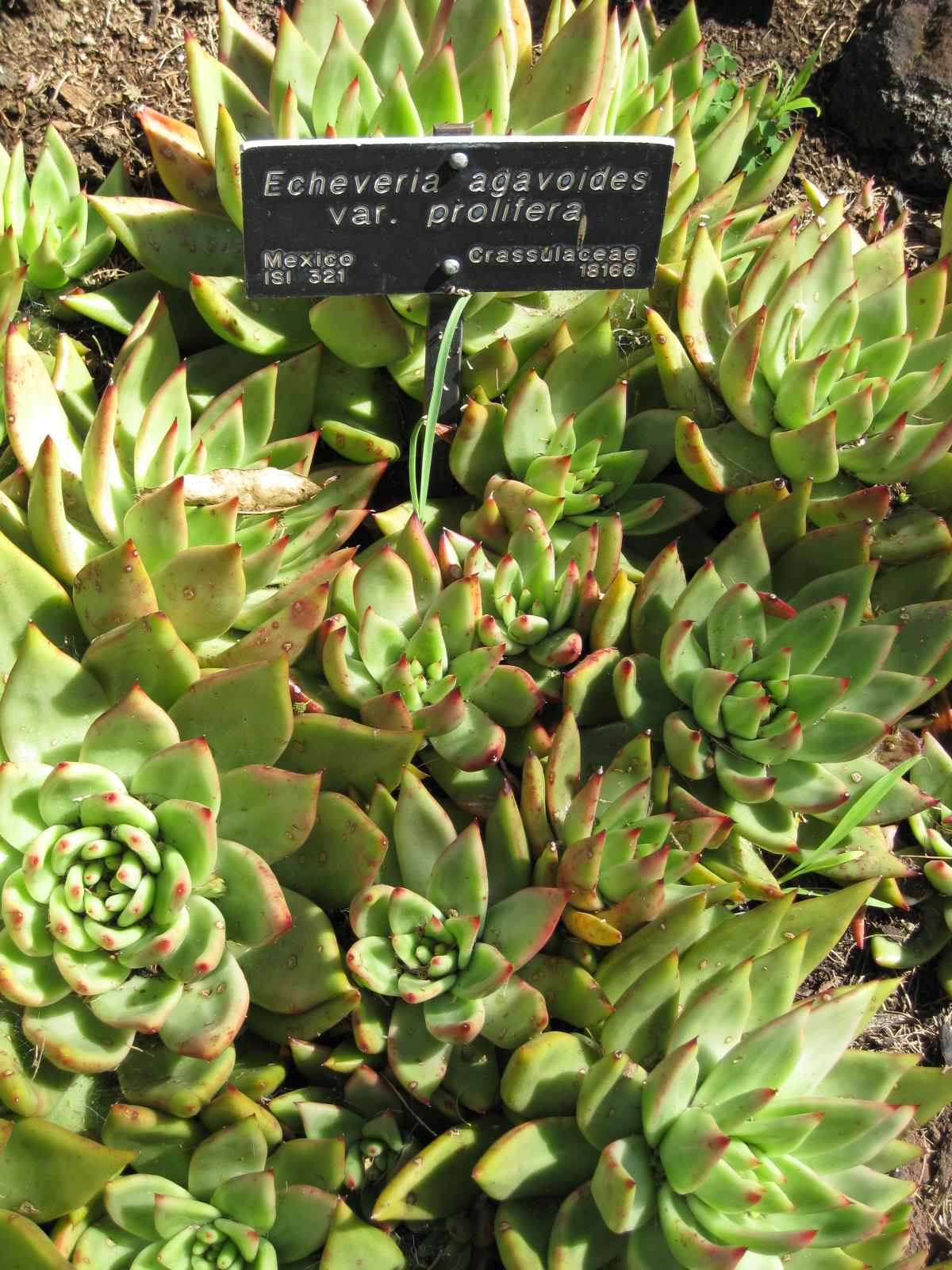
Echeveria agavoides var. prolifera, Huntington Gardens

Echeveria agavoides, or 'lipstick' echeveria, is a species of succulent flowering plant of the stonecrop (sedum) family Crassulaceae, native to the rocky canyons and arid hillsides of Central Mexico. It is primarily known from the states of Aguascalientes, Durango, Guanajuato, Hidalgo, Jalisco, Querétaro, San Luis Potosí and Zacatecas, though it has been sighted as far north as Coahuila and as far south as Oaxaca.

== Description ==
Echeveria agavoides is a small, stemless succulent plant, 8–12 centimetres (3.1–4.7 in) tall, with a rosette of leaves 7–15 centimetres (2.8–5.9 in) in diameter. It is often solitary, but old plants in good condition grow offsets. The leaves are green, triangular, thicker (6 mm) and more acute than the other echeverias - hence the explanation of their name agavoides, "looking like an agave". Some varieties with bright light have reddish (or bronze) tips and some forms have slightly red to very red margins. The inflorescences in summer appear on slender, single-sided cymes up to 50 centimetres (20 in) long. The flowers are pink, orange or red, the petals tipped with dark yellow.

== Etymology ==
Echeveria is named for Atanasio Echeverría y Godoy, a botanical illustrator who contributed to Flora Mexicana.

Agavoides means 'resembling Agave.'

== Taxonomy ==
Varieties:

- Echeveria agavoides var. agavoides
- Echeveria agavoides var. corderoyi (Baker) Poelln.
- Echeveria agavoides var. multifida E.Walther
- Echeveria agavoides var. prolifera E.Walther

Cultivars:

- 'Aquamarine', with icy, emerald-green leaves.
- 'Ebony', lighter-coloured leaves (almost beige or peach) with dark brown edges, almost burgundy.
- 'Lipstick', neon green leaves with irregular red leaf edges.
- 'Luming', with reddish, maroon-magenta leaves, maturing to dark purple; also has rather pointed leaves.
- 'Oculus', with an entirely burgundy-reddish colour.
- 'Rose Garnet', faint neon-green leaves of rather large and sturdy shape, tipped with magenta pink and maturing to red.
- 'Rubra', with dark reddish leaves growing in a notably tight, almost "closed" rosette.
- 'Salu' grows in a considerably tighter, closed rosette, with pale green leaves lightly tipped in red. Small "point" to the ends of the leaves, which mature to red.

== Cultivation ==
As with most echeverias, E. agavoides may be harmed by moisture and prefers mineral soils, growing best in light and even direct sunshine, which aids flowering. In order to flower, plants need rest in the winter, without water and in a cold place - but not less than 5 °C (41 °F). In temperate regions they must be kept indoors during winter, but may be placed outside during the summer months.

This plant has gained the Royal Horticultural Society's Award of Garden Merit.

Many hybrids have been created to obtain more brightly colored flowers or leaves.

The easiest methods of propagation are leaf cuttings and division of older plants. It propagates easily from cutting the stem although propagation from leaves can be more difficult. In order to propagate, one must take a sharp sterilized knife or scissors to cut away at the stem or leaves. Time must pass to allow for callousing before replanting.
