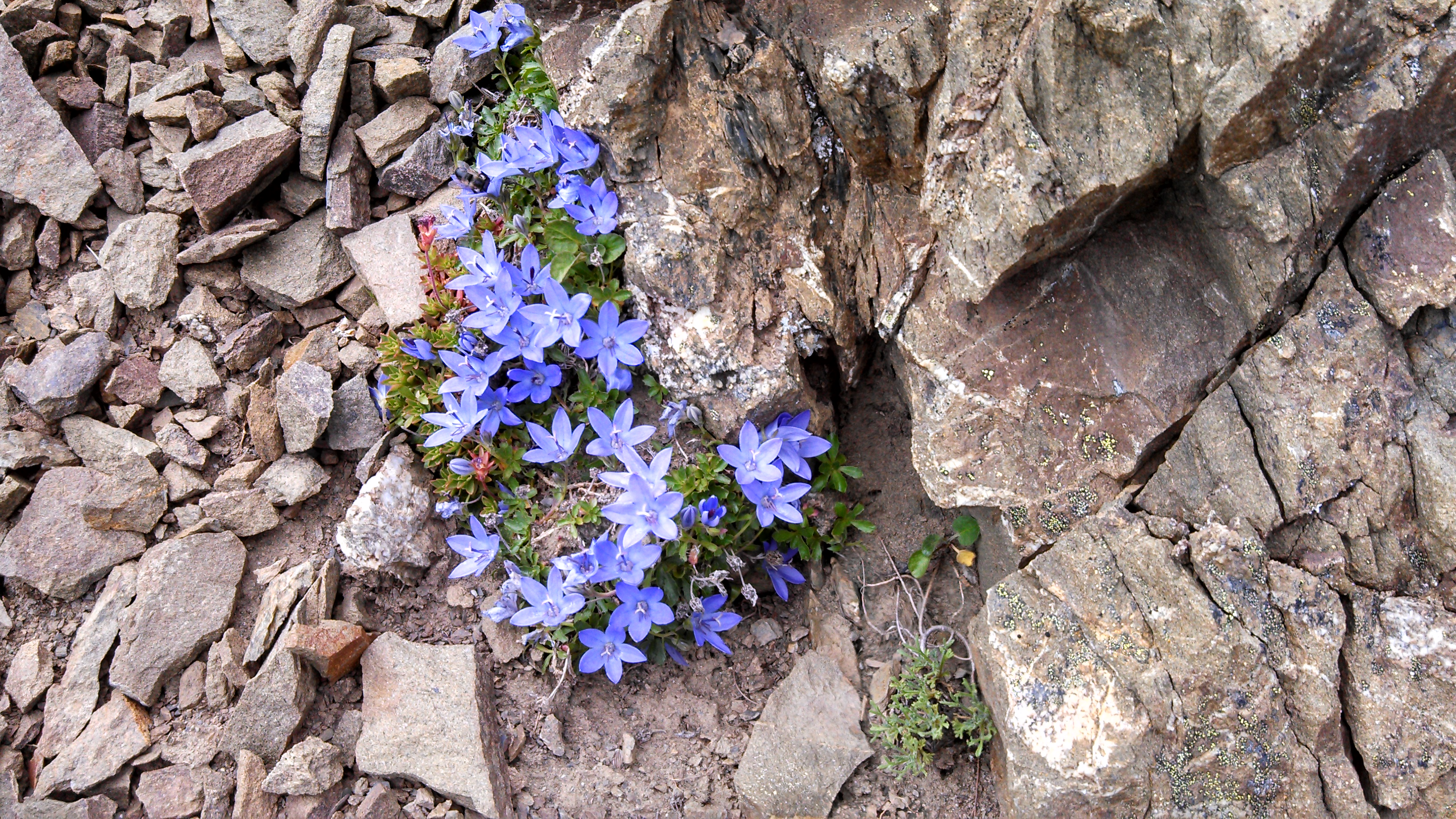

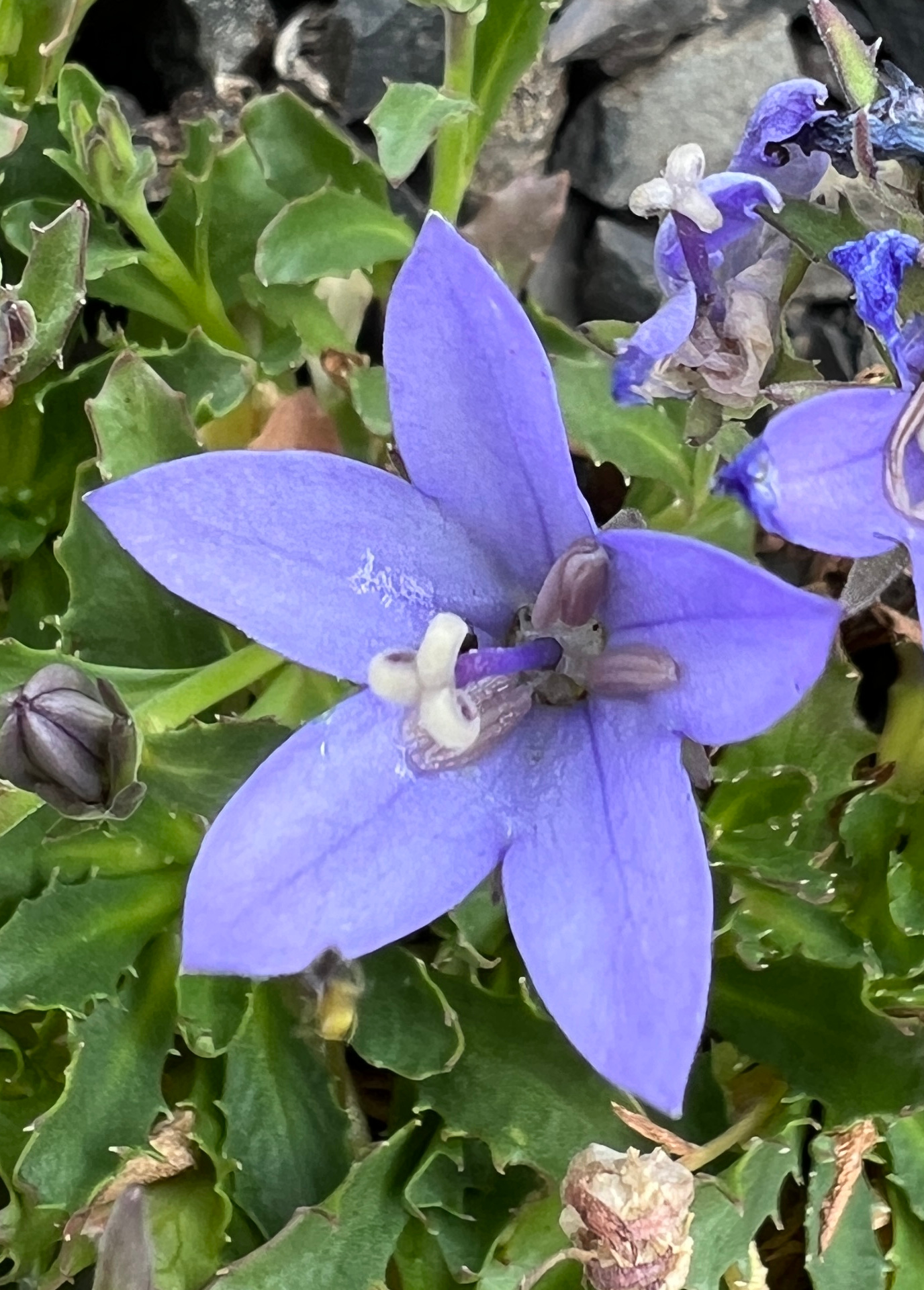

Conservation status
- Vulnerable (NatureServe)

Scientific classification
- Kingdom: Plantae
- Clade: Tracheophytes
- Clade: Angiosperms
- Clade: Eudicots
- Clade: Asterids
- Order: Asterales
- Family: Campanulaceae
- Genus: Campanula
- Species: C. piperi

Binomial name
- Campanula piperi Howell

= Campanula piperi =

Species of flowering plant

Campanula piperi (Olympic bellflower, Olympic harebell, Piper's bellflower) is a species of flowering plant in the bellflower family, Campanulaceae. It is native to the Olympic Mountains on the Olympic Peninsula in the U.S. state of Washington. It has also been noted on Vancouver Island, British Columbia.

== Description ==
This species is a perennial herb with stems up to 10 centimeters tall. It is hairless or with fine, rough hairs. The basal leaves are sharply toothed, widely lance-shaped blades up to 3 centimeters long. Leaves higher on the stem are similar and are alternately arranged. Flowers occur in July and August at the stem tips. Each has five toothed sepals and a saucer-shaped blue corolla with 5 lobes about 1.2 to 1.6 centimeters long. White flowers are known to occur at times.

== Habitat ==
This plant grows in rocky, high-elevation habitat. It faced the potential threat of trampling by mountain goats, an introduced species in the range, but now extirpated.

== Cultivation ==
This species is cultivated in alpine plant gardens. A number of cultivars have been bred.

== History ==
The species name commemorates the botanist Charles Piper.
