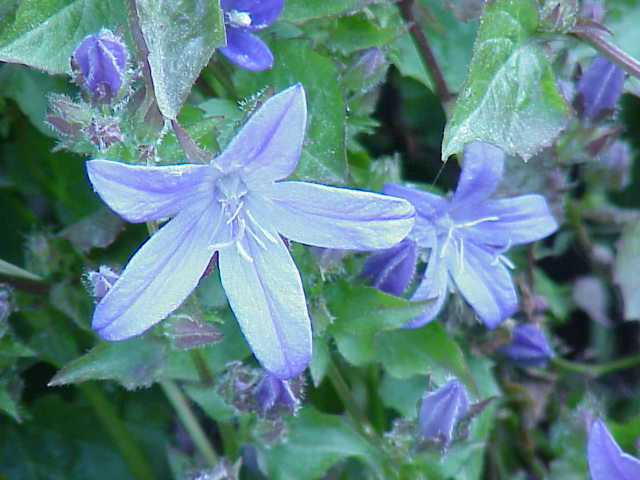

Scientific classification
- Kingdom: Plantae
- Clade: Tracheophytes
- Clade: Angiosperms
- Clade: Eudicots
- Clade: Asterids
- Order: Asterales
- Family: Campanulaceae
- Genus: Campanula
- Species: C. poscharskyana

Binomial name
- Campanula poscharskyana Degen

= Campanula poscharskyana =

Species of flowering plant in the bellflower family

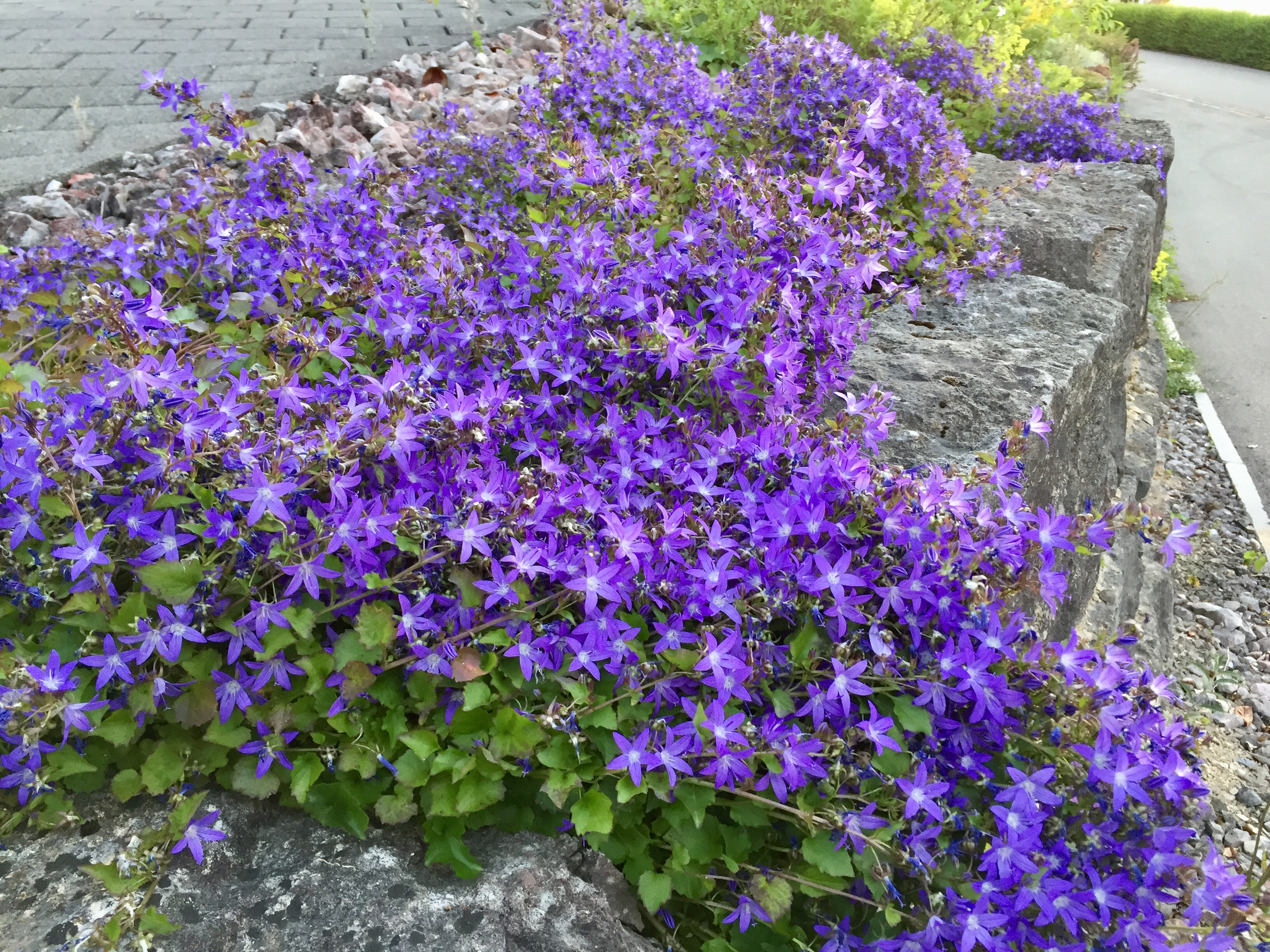
Purple cultivar

Campanula poscharskyana, the Serbian bellflower or trailing bellflower, is a semi-evergreen trailing perennial, valued for its lavender-blue star-shaped flowers. It is native to the Dinaric Alps in former Yugoslavia.

== Description ==
The leaves are 2.5–4.0 cm (1–1 1/2 in) long. The shoots grow along the ground, reaching about 20–25 cm (7 3/4–9 3/4 in) long. They then grow upwards, placing the flowers about 10 cm (3.9 in) above the ground. Flowers are lavender-blue and bloom from mid-spring to early autumn.

== Cultivation and uses ==
This tough rockery plant bears sprays of violet starry flowers in spring and summer. Vigorous and fast growing, it is able to stand drying out once established in a wall. It will self-seed into cracks in walls and paving.

During winter, it survives best at 5–10 °C (41–50 °F), but can tolerate both colder and warmer temperatures. Although it is considered winter hardy, many growers bring it indoors and keep it in slightly moist soil on a windowsill, or in the basement under a lamp.

It is common to cut the plant down during the fall, so it can conserve energy during the winter, and then replant it in spring. In winter, no fertilizer is needed.

Plants can be grown from stem cuttings or division of the roots.

Numerous varieties and cultivars have been developed for garden use, including 'Blue Gown', 'Blue Waterfall', 'Freya', 'E.H. Frost', 'Glandore', 'Lisduggan Variety', 'Senior', and 'Silberregen'. The cultivar 'Stella' has gained the Royal Horticultural Society's Award of Garden Merit.

The leaves are edible year round, and can be put in salads.

== Pests ==
Thrips and aphids feed on the leaves.
