= Rilić (mountain) =

Mountain in Dalmatia, Croatia

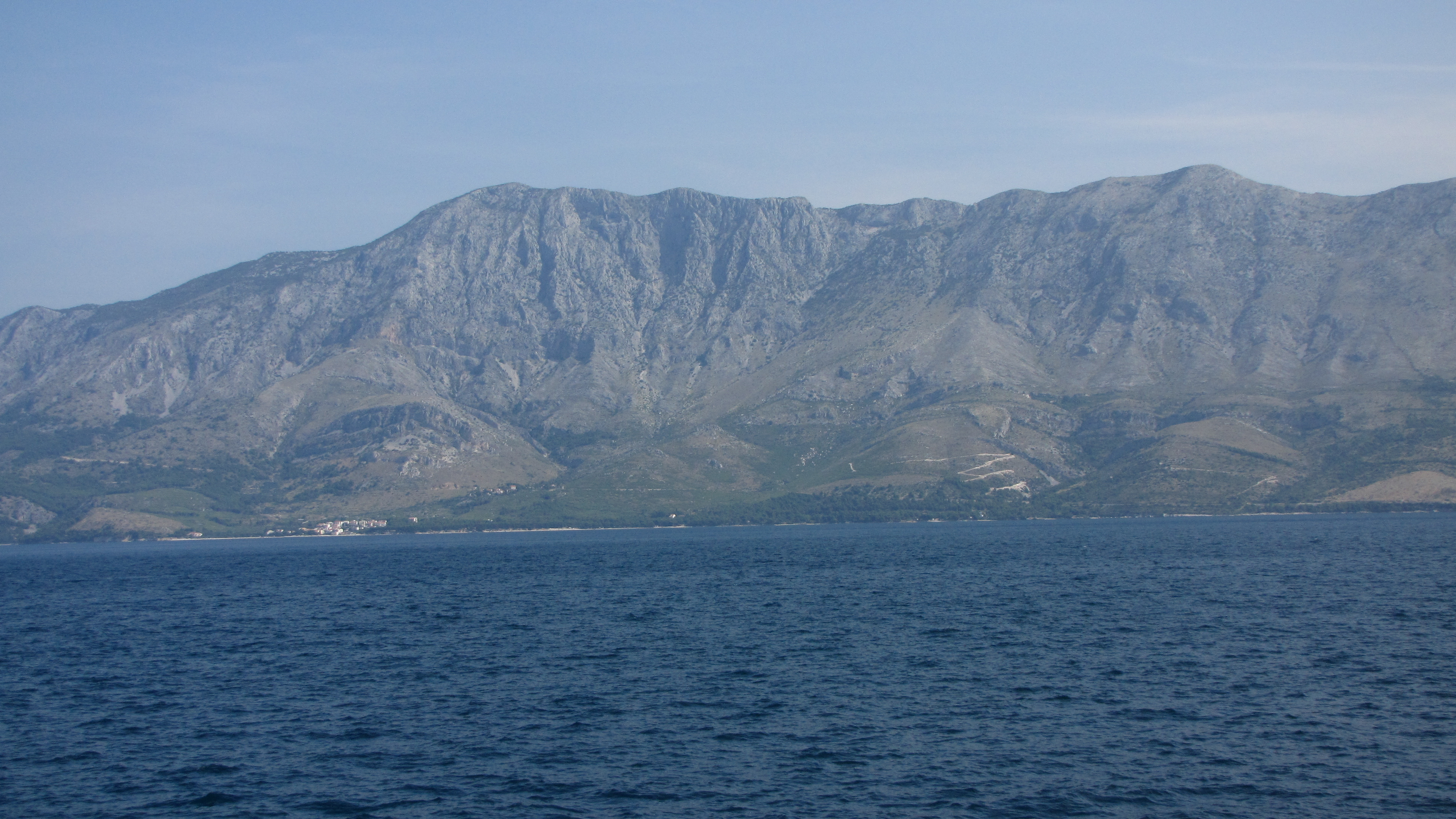
- Peak Sutvid

Highest point
- Elevation: 1,160 m (3,810 ft)
- Coordinates: 43°11′30.2″N 17°11′39.2″E

Geography
- Location within Croatia
- Location: Croatia

Rilić is a mountain in Dalmatia, Croatia, located southeast of Biokovo. Its highest peaks are Velika Kapela or Sutvid (1,160 m or 3,810 ft), Šapašnik (920 m or 3,020 ft) and Sveti Ilija (773 m or 2,536 ft).
