= Biokovo =

Second-highest mountain range in Croatia, located in coastal Dalmatia

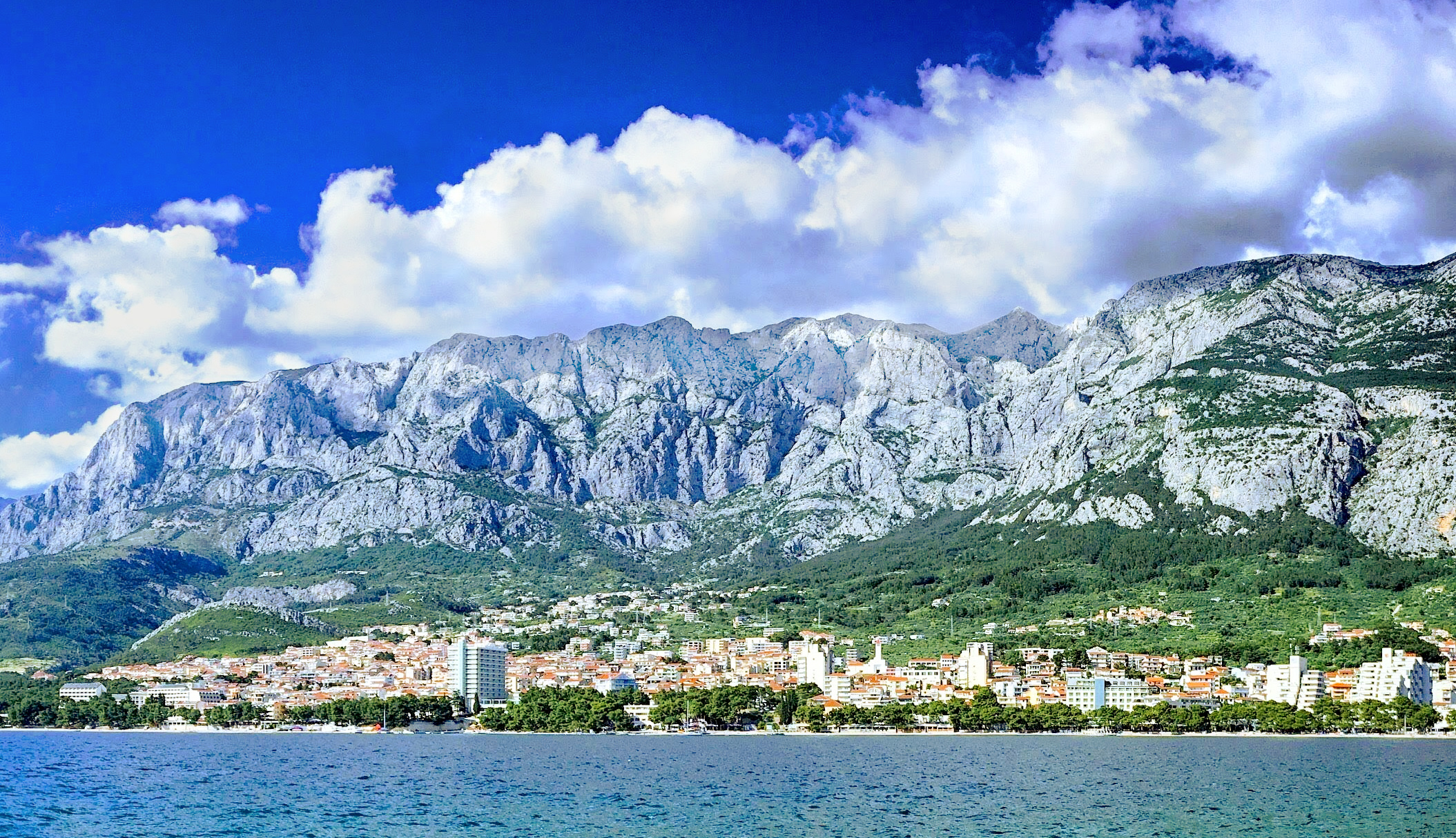
- Biokovo from Makarska

Highest point
- Elevation: 1,762 m (5,781 ft)
- Prominence: 1,168 m (3,832 ft)
- Listing: Ribu
- Coordinates: 43°20′N 17°03′E

Geography
- Location within Croatia
- Location: Dalmatia, Croatia

Geology
- Mountain type: Limestone

Climbing
- Easiest route: Biokovo Road

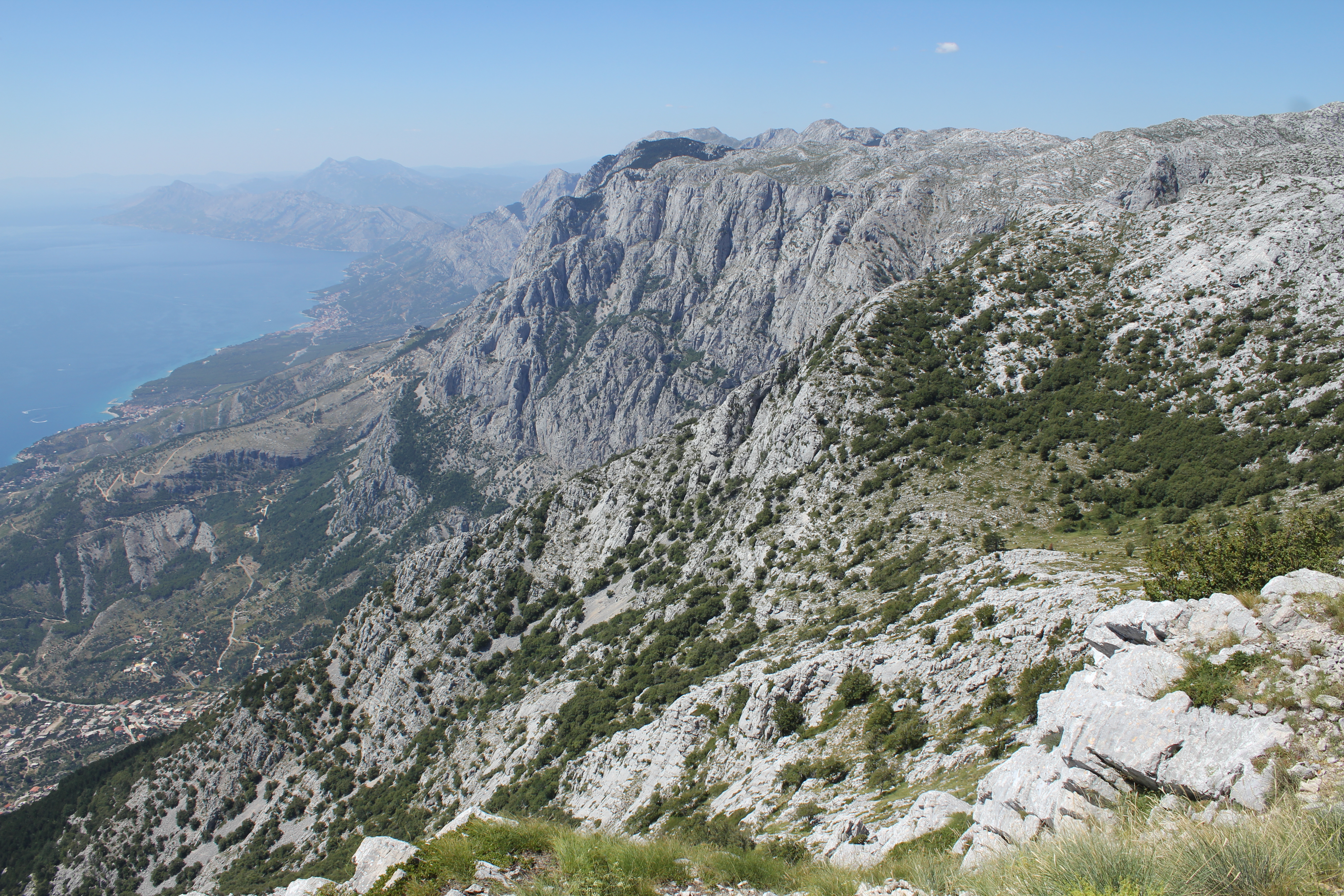
Biokovo towering above Makarska riviera

Biokovo (pronounced [bîɔkɔʋɔ]) is the second-highest mountain range in Croatia, located along the Dalmatian coast of the Adriatic Sea, between the rivers of Cetina and Neretva.

It is sometimes referred to as Bijakova, especially among inhabitants of the eastern side of the mountain. Its highest peak is Sveti Jure (Saint George), at 1762 m.a.s.l. It shows a typical karst landscape. Atop the peak there is a powerful FM and DVB-T transmitter.

The 196 km^{2} of its area is protected as a nature park with over 1,500 plant and animal species, some of which are endemic.

Biokovo also includes the separate ridge and peak Sveti Ilija (Saint Elijah) at 1,642 m or 5,387 ft.

Biokovo is one in a line of Dinaric Alps stretching along the Dalmatian coast - northwest of it is Mosor and southeast are Sutvid and Rilić. To the east, the Šibenik runs in parallel. When the weather is very clear, from the top of Biokovo it is possible to see Monte Gargano in Italy, which is 252 km (157 mi) away.

Zabiokovlje, a mountainous area in Biokovo, includes such townlets and villages as Gornja Brela, Zadvarje, Žeževica, Grabovac, Rastovac, Zagvozd, Župa, Rašćane and Kozica. Major economic activities there were cattle raising, grape growing, and hunting. Part of this area is in the Biokovo Nature Park. To aid hikers, the Biokovo Nature Park Visitor Center is in downtown Makarska.

However, Biokovo can be perilous if hiking unprepared - tourists erroneously imagine peaks to be closer than they are and, oblivious to the danger, have been known to go hiking wearing flip-flops, without water, wearing shirts with military camouflage patterns making them harder to spot for search and rescue teams. From 1976 to 2007, 24 hikers have died on Biokovo, while 37 had to be rescued.

== Geology ==
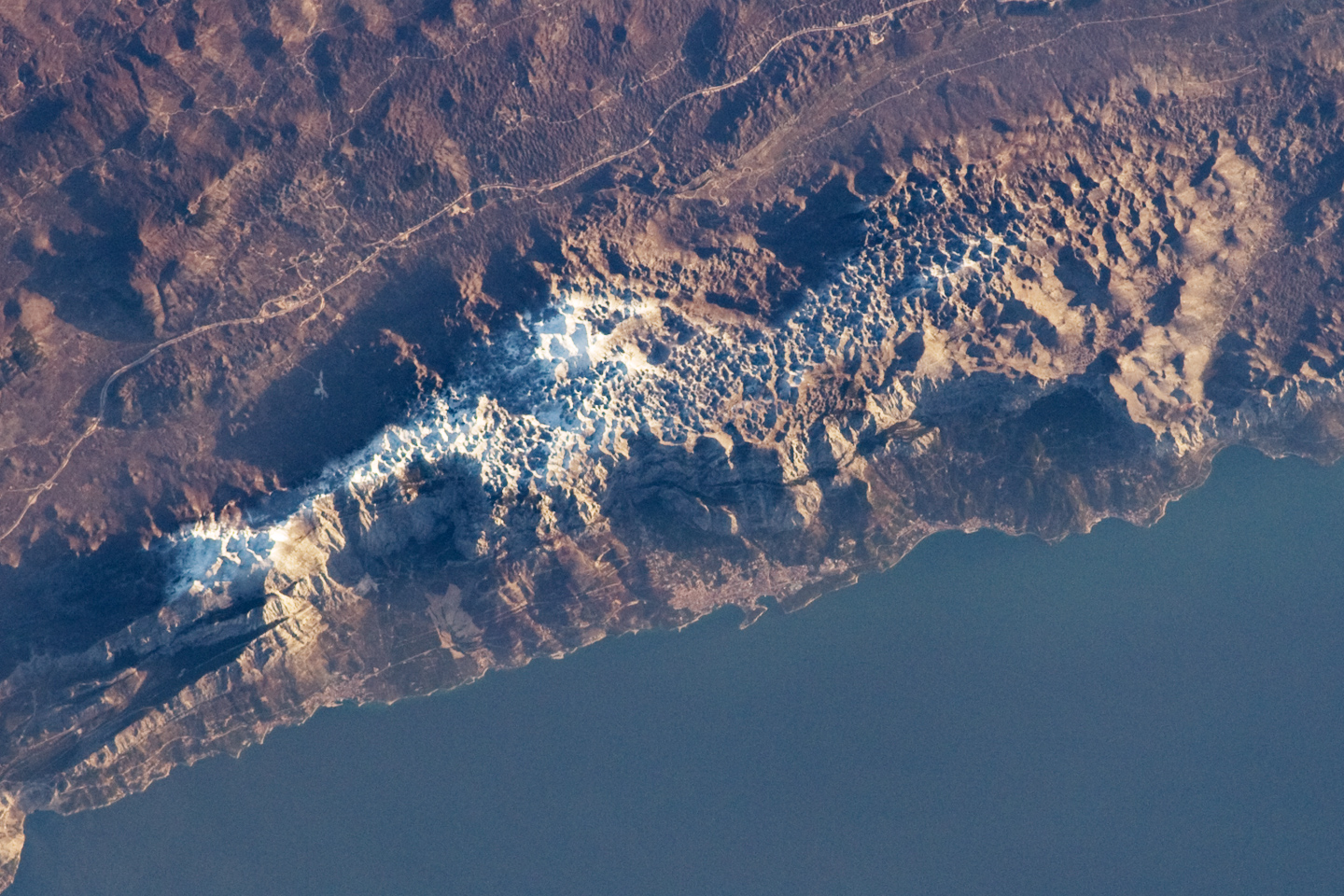
Biokovo from Space

Biokovo is a typical karstic mountain composed of limestones, dolomites, breccias, and flysch.

The mountain has more than 400 identified speleological objects. Notable speleological objects are:

- Njemica (-983 m)
- Mokre noge (-831 m)
- Amfora (-788 m)
- Vilimova jama (A-2) (-589 m)
- Jama pod Kamenitim vratima (-499 m)
- Stara škola (-497 m)
- Sveti Ilija Tunnel caverns

== Sports & recreation ==
=== Professional road bicycle racing ===
Sveti Jure has recently found itself included as a climb in professional road bicycle races. It was visited for the first time on the second stage of the 2017 Tour of Croatia. However, due to bad weather the race organisers decided to shorten the stage in accordance with the UCI Extreme weather protocol. The final route was shortened by 15,2 km, moving the finish line down to Vrata Biokova on an altitude of 820 meters.

The stage was won by Croatian rider Kristijan Đurasek of the team UAE Team Emirates, outsprinting Jaime Rosón (Caja Rural–Seguros RGA) with eventual general classification winner Vincenzo Nibali (Bahrain-Merida) finishing third, three seconds down.

The climb was revisited at the 2018 Tour of Croatia, where it was included as a 28 km long climb serving as summit finish on the third stage, which was dubbed as the queen stage of that year's edition. The stage was won by Belarusian rider Kanstantsin Siutsou riding for Team Bahrain-Merida, after 75 minutes of climbing.

=== Mountain huts ===
In the 1935–1936 season, the Aleksandrov dom mountain hut on Vošac, at 1,400 metres (4,600 ft) in elevation, saw 555 visitors, including 126 Czechoslovak, 22 German and 5 English visitors. Even though it was only open over the summer (1 May through 30 September), it had the most foreign visitors of any mountain hut owned by the HPS, even compared to the mountain hut on Vražje Vršće (Papuk). This continued in the 1936–1937 season, when it saw 454 visitors, including 103 Czechoslovak, 92 Austrian, 17 German, 7 French an 2 Polish citizens. In the 1937–1938 season it saw 572 visitors, including 139 Czechoslovak, 54 German, 25 Austrian, 24 Polish and 5 English citizens, being overtaken by the mountain hut on Vidova gora as the most visited by foreigners in HPS ownership.

== Mass graves ==
The Directorate for Detainees and Missing People of the Ministry of Croatian Veterans exhumed on 7th-8th April 2026 the remains of nine people killed at the end of World War II in the Medviđa cave on Biokovo, near Zagvozd.

== See also ==
- List of mountains in Croatia
- Amfora Pit
- List of protected areas of Croatia

== Bibliography ==
=== Alpinism ===
- Poljak, Željko (February 1959). "Biokovo". Kazalo za "Hrvatski planinar" i "Naše planine" 1898—1958 (PDF). Naše planine. Vol. XI. pp. 18–19. ISSN 0354-0650.

=== Biology ===
- Šašić, Martina; Nahirnić, Ana; Tarmann, Gerhard M. (2016-12-31). "Zygaenidae (Lepidoptera) in the Lepidoptera collections of the Croatian Natural History Museum". Natura Croatica: Periodicum Musei Historiae Naturalis Croatici. 25 (2): 233–248. doi:10.20302/NC.2016.25.19. eISSN 1848-7386.
