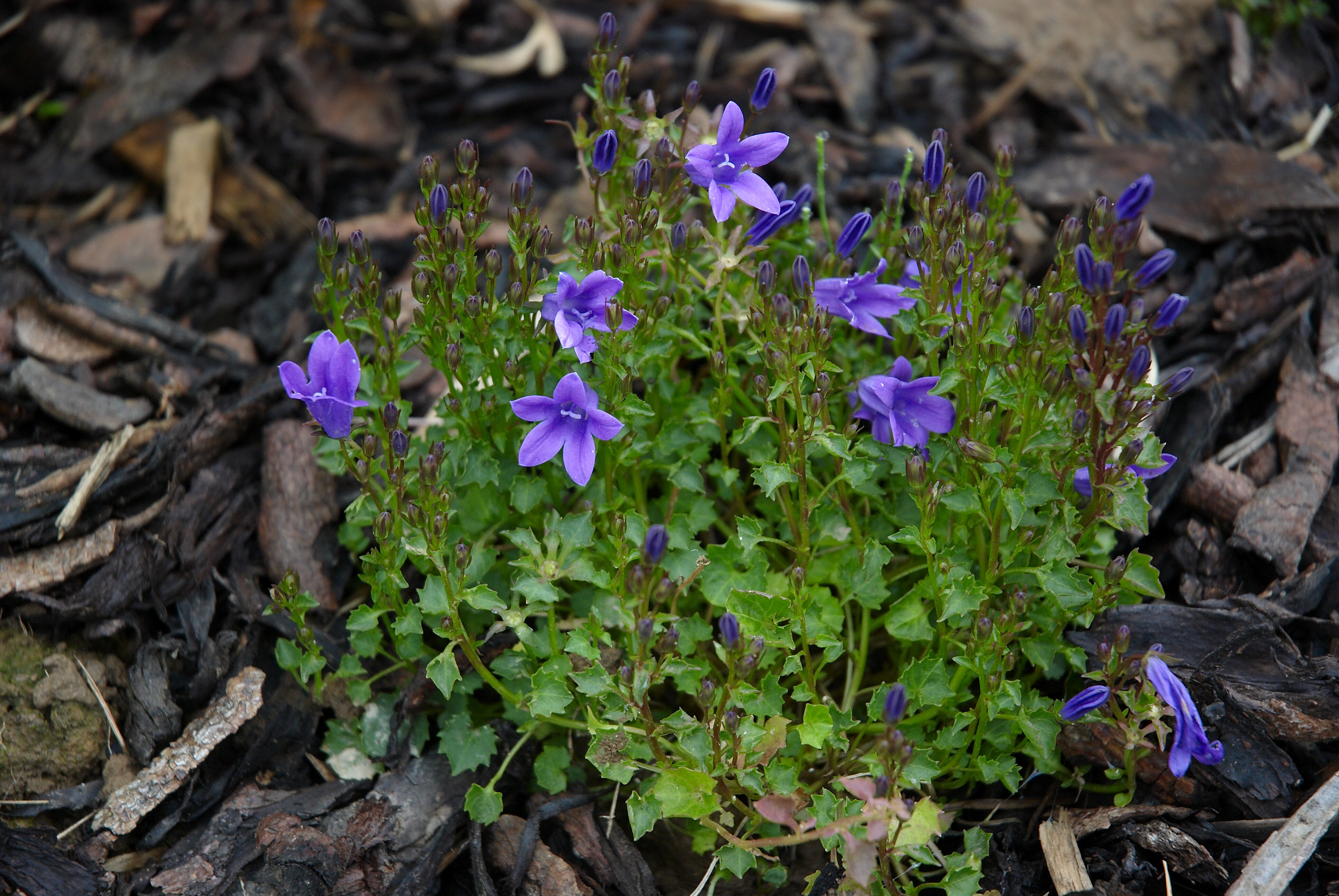

Scientific classification
- Kingdom: Plantae
- Clade: Tracheophytes
- Clade: Angiosperms
- Clade: Eudicots
- Clade: Asterids
- Order: Asterales
- Family: Campanulaceae
- Genus: Campanula
- Species: C. portenschlagiana

Binomial name
- Campanula portenschlagiana Roem. & Schult.

= Campanula portenschlagiana =

Species of flowering plant

Campanula portenschlagiana, the wall bellflower, is a species of flowering plant in the family Campanulaceae, native to the Dalmatian Mountains in Croatia. It is a vigorous, low-growing, mound-forming evergreen perennial with deep purple flowers in summer. Other common names include Dalmatian bellflower, Adria bellflower and Campanula muralis.

== Description ==
The plant forms a mat of foliage about 10 cm (4 in) high and 50 cm (20 in) or more wide, with many heart- or kidney-shaped leaves. Deep purple or blue, funnel-shaped, 5-petalled flowers, 2 cm (0.8 in) long, are borne in profusion, completely covering the plant from mid- to late summer.

Flowers may be pollinated by beetles, flies, bees and butterflies, but are also capable of self-pollinating.

The Latin specific epithet portenschlagiana commemorates the Austrian naturalist Franz von Portenschlag-Leydermayer (1772–1822).

== Cultivation and uses ==
Campanula portenschlagiana is an alpine plant requiring sharp drainage, so is suitable for an alpine garden, rock garden, or as groundcover, in sun or partial shade. Given suitable conditions, it will rapidly colonise cracks and crevices in walls and pavements. It is hardy to USDA hardiness zone 3.

This plant has gained the Royal Horticultural Society's Award of Garden Merit.
