= Makarska Riviera =

Section of the Croatian coast

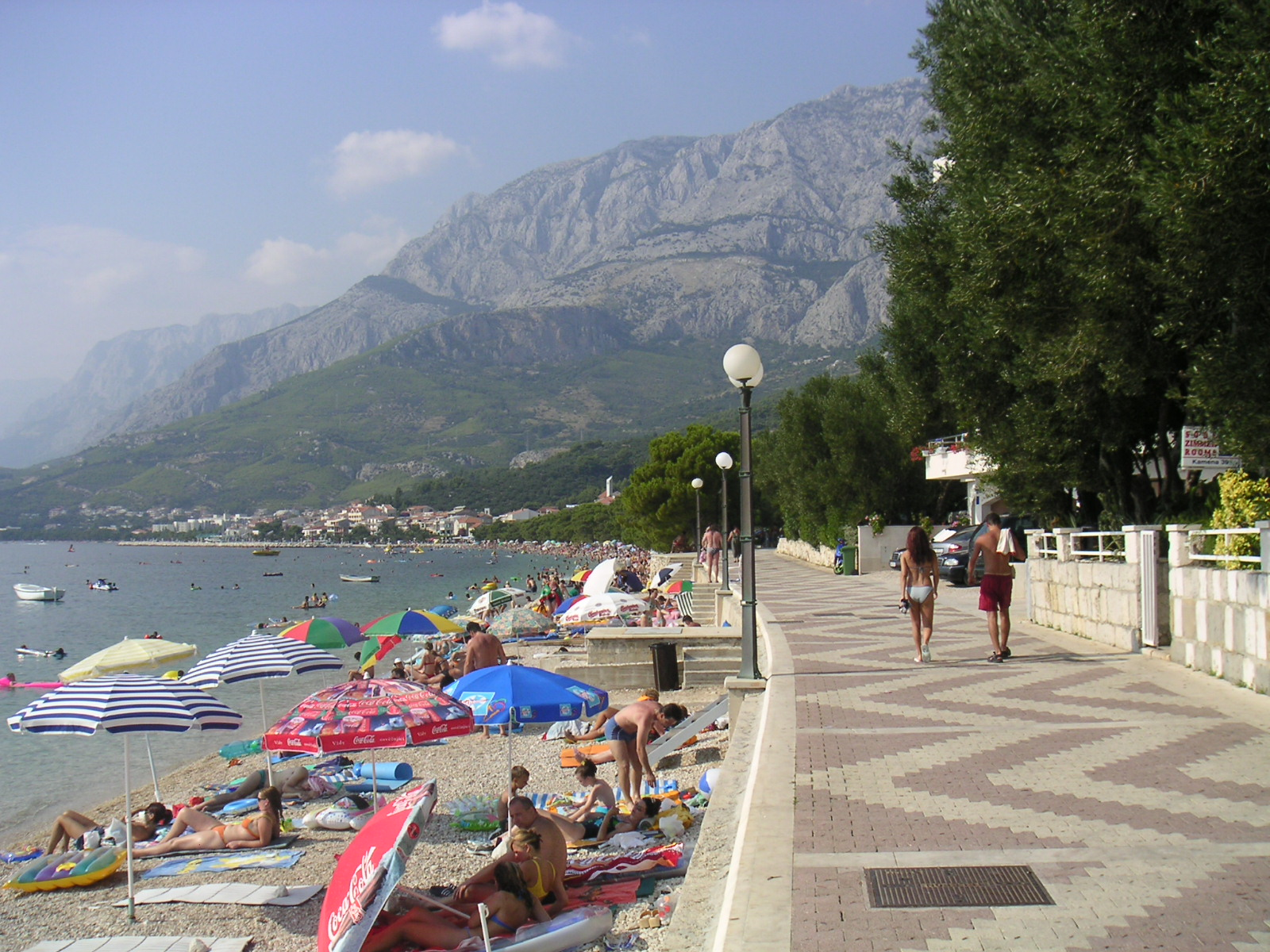
Tučepi

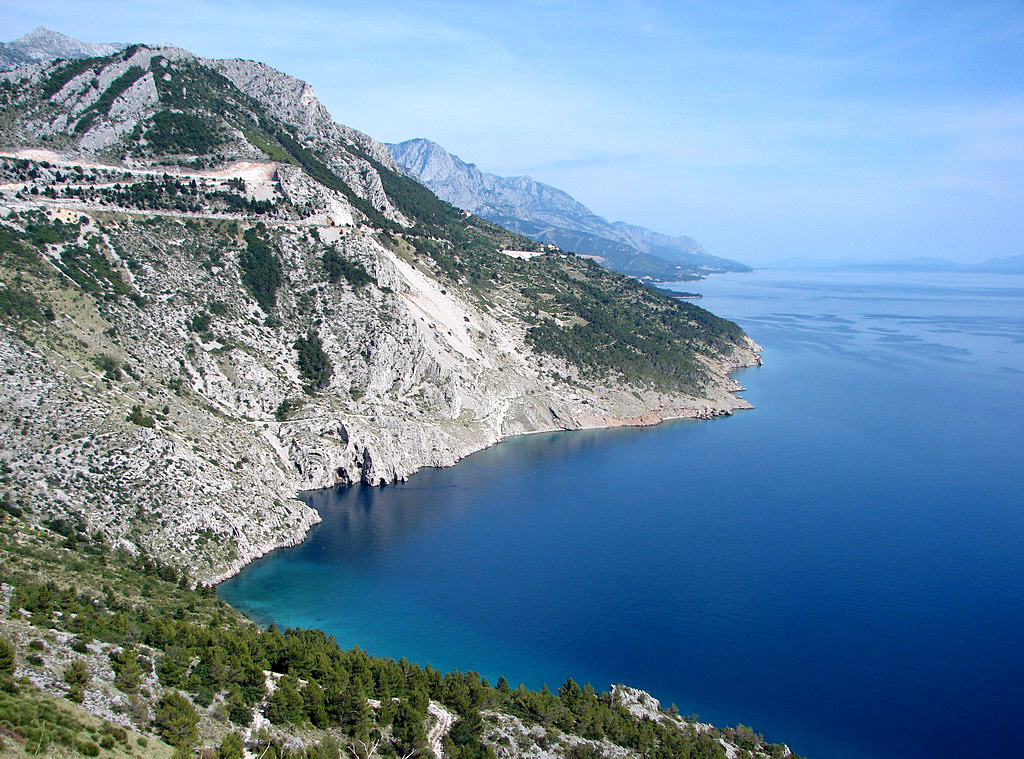
Makarska Riviera

The Makarska Riviera is a part of the Croatian coast of the Adriatic Sea, about 60 kilometers (37 miles) long and several kilometers wide, at the foot of Croatia's second-highest mountain Biokovo. A sunny climate and long pebbled beaches make this region a popular tourist destination. There is a string of settlements along the coast from the Omiš coast in the northwest to Neretva Delta in the southeast:

- Brela (population 1,618 according to 2001 census)
- Baška Voda (2,045)
- Promajna (456)
- Krvavica (287)
- Bratuš (-)
- Bast (136)
- Makarska, the center of the region (13,716)
- Tučepi (1,763)
- Podgora (1,534)
- Drašnice (328)
- Igrane (480)
- Živogošće (538)
- Drvenik (500)
- Zaostrog (372)
- Podaca (716)
- Brist (453)
- Gradac (1,574)

== See also ==
- Riviera, featuring links to articles on the many coastal strips around the world which are known as Riviera
