= Podaca =

Coastal village in southern Dalmatia, Croatia

- Location within Croatia
- Coordinates: 43.129°N 17.298°E
- Country: Croatia
- County: Split-Dalmatia
- Municipality: Gradac

Area
  - Total: 11.1 km^{2} (4.3 sq mi)

Population (2021)
  - Total: 421
  - Density: 37.9/km^{2} (98.2/sq mi)
- Time zone: UTC+1 (CET)
  - Summer (DST): UTC+2 (CEST)

Podaca is a coastal village and tourist locality in southern Dalmatia, Croatia, halfway between big urban centers of Split and Dubrovnik, or more closely cities of Makarska and Ploče, in the Gradac municipality, placed across from neigbouring peninsula Pelješac and the south end of Hvar (Pharos) island.

Podaca as a part of the Makarska littoral is completely oriented towards tourism, with fairly limited olive agriculture. There was a population of about 660 inhabitants (according to data from 2009 census) of Podaca. As of 90s there has been a trend of older population from neighboring regions (mostly Bosnia & Herzegovina) retiring to live in the area, extending the use of their summer vacation houses. However many of the local youth are also leaving the area for education and especially for work abroad in much higher frequency since Croatia joined European Union.

== Life quality and development ==
Podaca features beaches, pinewood forests, and a local cuisine focused on regional Dalmatian specialties. Its proximity to several daytrip destinations and lower tourist activity during the off-season make it a destination for family tourism.

=== Climate ===
The climate is temperate. Based on 2014 statistics data from NASA the average temperature is 15 °C. The warmest month is July, at 28 °C, and the coldest January, at 6 °C. The average rainfall is 1,912 millimeters per year. The wettest month is February, with 263 millimeters of rain, and the most dry August, with 49 millimeters.

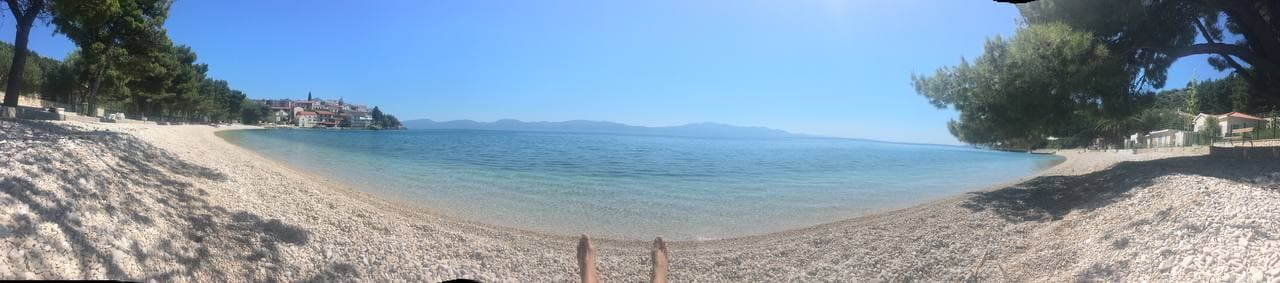
Viskovića Vala (bay) beach in Podaca

=== Tourism ===
The locality has about 1100 beds available in private rooms and suits, with ca. 183 accommodation units in the tourist resort Morenia (renovated, extended and up-scaled 2017-218) with about 600 accommodation units at the camping site "Uvala borova" (The pine bay) and 30 units at mini-camping Podaca. Unfortunately most of the facilities get closed and activities are reduced as early as October and only re-activate in May or some even at the start of June.

=== Development ===
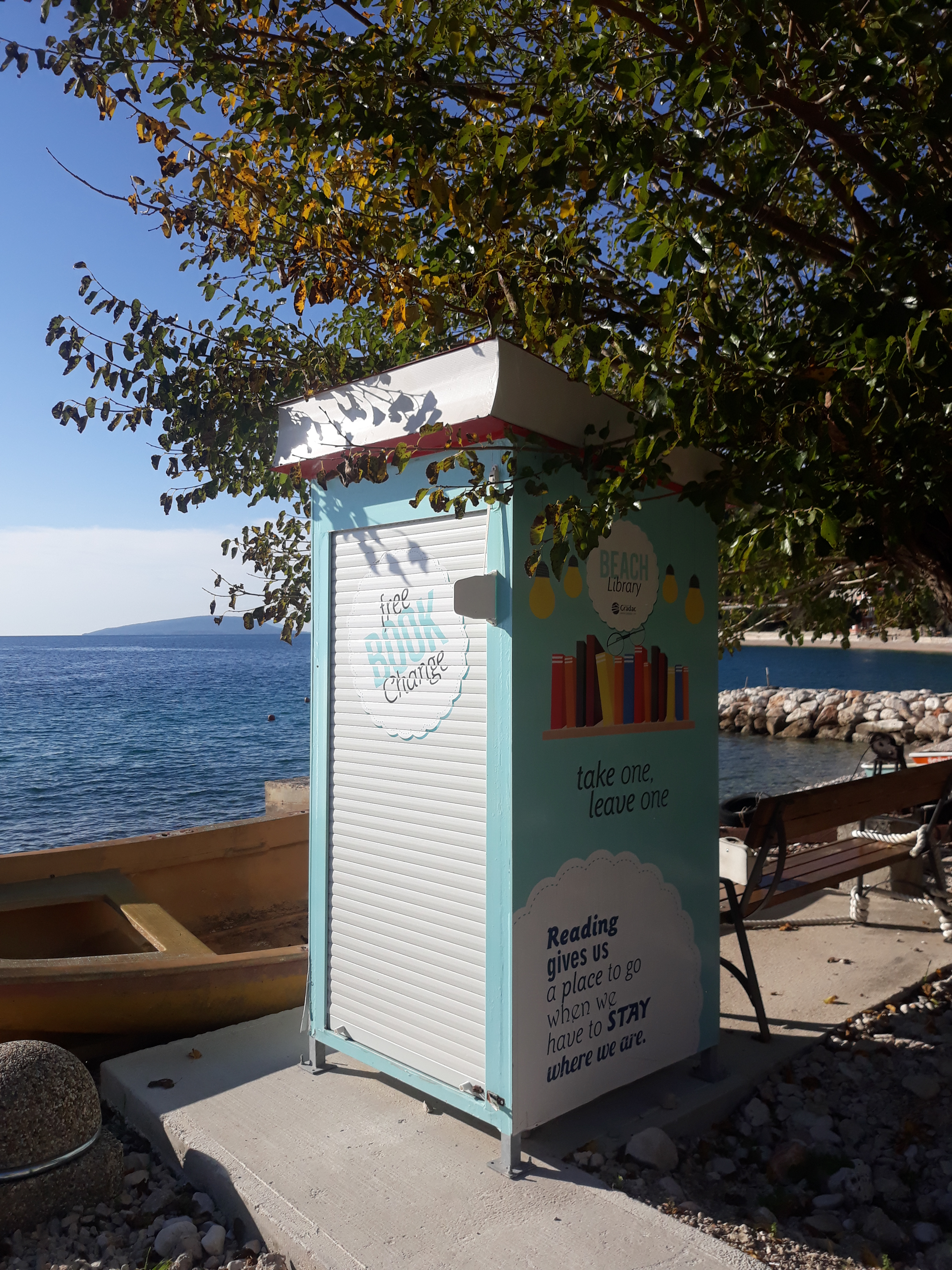
Beach library in 2020, in Podaca

After many years of decay (since the war in early 90s) first significant infrastructural development was done only since 2017 with establishing and fixing pathways and building playground for kids and open air sport courts, as a signs of better governance with the change of the local political climate. Medical emergency point has been established in 2017 the former building of supermarket "Razvitak" (now also post office) to serve near by villages and towns. Establishing of innovative mini cultural outpost in the form of "beach library" became a good sign of potential for future. Through European Union subsidy most basic free WiFi hotspots were installed in place in the center of Podaca (next to bus stop) and Viskovića Vala beach area (as is in neighboring villages/towns).

Due to new A1 highway of Croatia from Zagreb to Ploče (with no exits close by) and also the change of the bus-business operations (Flixbus reduced bus stops), Podaca and most of smaller towns and villages became significantly less accessible by public transport. Buses are only options, but few are available in daytime and rare later in the day from Dubrovnik and Split, while Makarska and Ploče also not later in the evenings and early night.

== History ==
Podaca village was initially located up the hill, but since 60s along the coast, divided in three neighborhoods that are seamlessly connected to next villages: Kapeć (bordering Zaostrog), Viskovića vala and Ravanje (bordering Brist).

Old Podaca was founded on the rocky slopes as defensible location, and there are traces of human habitation since Stone Age, like a stone mallet for mixing grain, which is kept in a Franciscan monastery at Zaostrog. Many stone ruins beneath Biokovo bear witness to the period of Illyrian habitation (2000 years BC - 1st century).

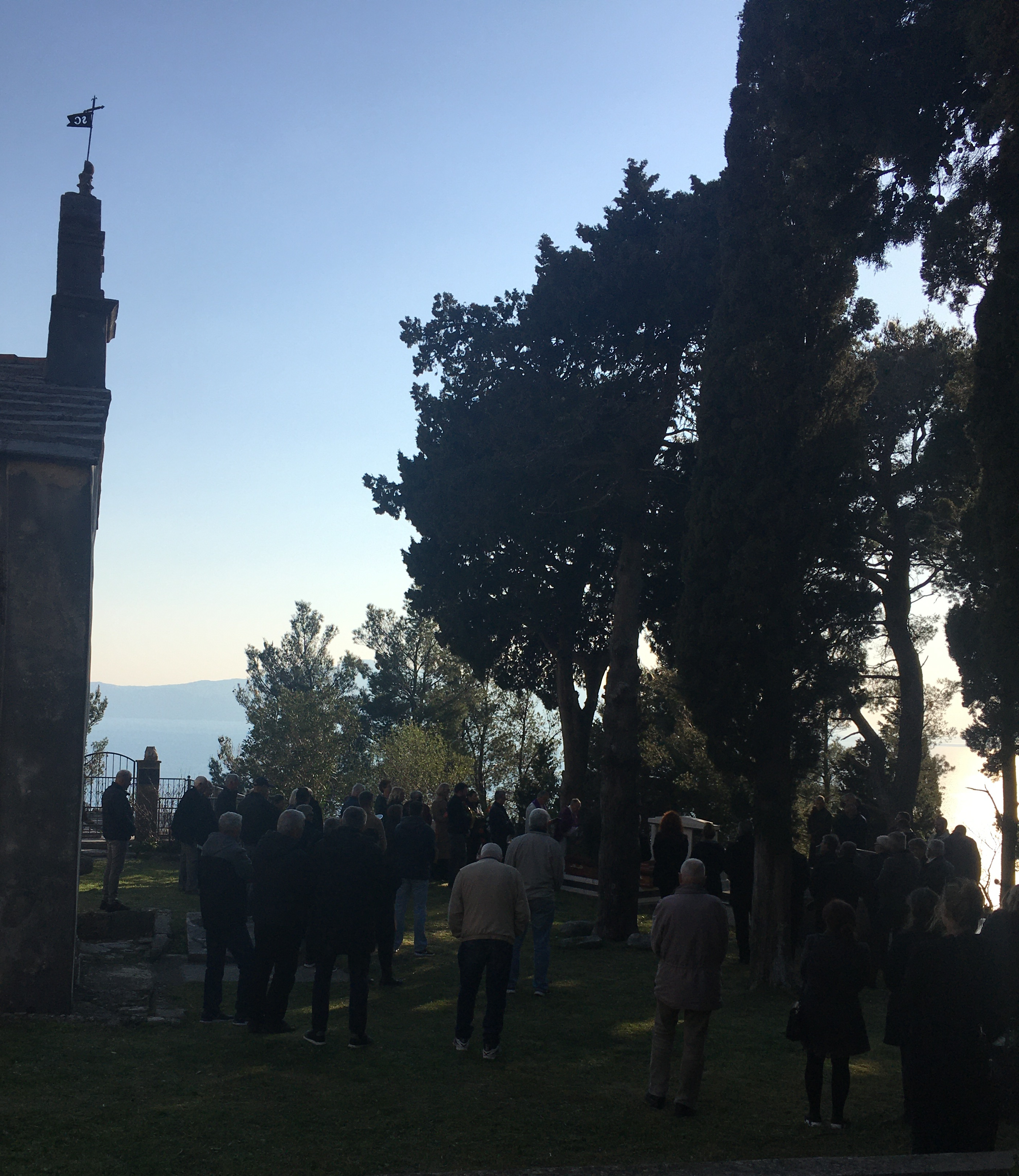
St. Ivan, old cemetery funeral of Ines Visković, first head nurse of the regional hospital KBC Split

During the Roman rule this area was administrated from Narona. There are many artifacts from that period like a broken jar with a silver coin with a Roman emperor Sever (193-211AD), which were found here. Other remains from the Roman age include a part of the walls, near which a Christian tone tablet was found, dated from the Middle Ages. During the Large migrations Croats inhabited these parts (7th - 8th century). They founded their settlements high on the hilltops, in order to have a more defensible position and to make use of mountain pastures.

The Middle Ages were marked with a constant struggle between Croats and Venetians. Croats were at the peak of their naval might during the dominance of Kacic dynasty, with their decline (1280) Croatian naval dominance also declined. One of the remains from that period (11th-12th century) is an old Croatian church of St. Ivan with tombs of Kacic family at Gornja Podaca, which were Kacic ancestral lands. The church of St. Ivan at the Podaca cemetery was built in pre-Romanesque period in the 11th and 12th centuries. Not far from the church of St. Ivan, built in 1492, stood the church of St. Stjepan, which was razed to the ground in the 18th century to make room for a present-day church built in 1762. After an earthquake in 1962, almost the entire population migrated to the coastal area where a new church was built to Our Lady of Annunciation. Near the church there lies a cemetery with ancient tombstones.

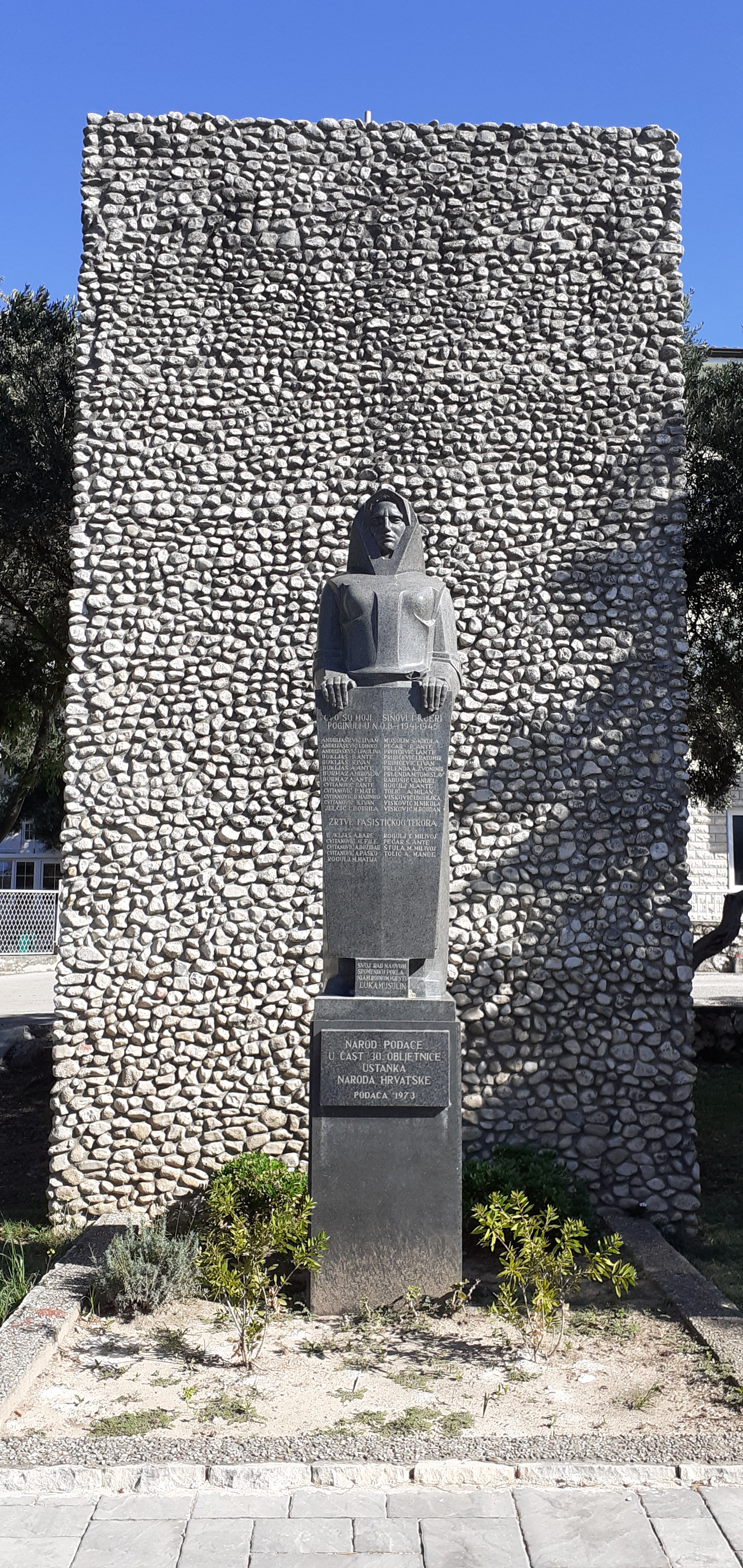
Monument to local victims of WW2 by Luka Musulin in Podaca

During the World War 2 many of the people of Podaca were killed fighting Fascism or as victim of the regime. Sculptor Luka Musulin (student of famous Antun Augustinčić) made and gave as a present to his birthplace an impressive larger than life size sculpture in dark granite of Dalmatian mother holding a list with their names.
