= Svjetlo riječi =

Bosnian magazine

Svjetlo riječi (Croatian: Light of the Word) is a Bosnian monthly family magazine covering the subjects of faith, society, and culture. The owner and publisher of the magazine is the Franciscan Province of Bosna Srebrena.

On the trace of the rich publishing history of the Bosnian Franciscans, the magazine was started in 1983 in Visoko by a group of Franciscan enthusiasts, members of the two Franciscan provinces in Bosnia and Herzegovina. The publishers of the magazine until 1992 were the provincials of the two provinces. Since that year, the Bosnian Franciscan Province remained the sole owner and publisher. The magazine is edited by a small editorial staff, which is named by the provincial authorities.

From the very start, apart from its religious themes, the magazine also engaged cultural, societal, and even political issues, and because of that, during its twenty-year existence, it earned a respectable number of both admirers and critics.

== Editorial Headquarters ==
- Visoko: April 1983 to November 1984
- Sarajevo: December 1984 to March 1992
- Split: April to August 1992
- Baška Voda – Hotel Slavija: September/October 1992 to September 1993
- Livno: October 1993 to April 1998 (until March 1998 the address of Hotel Slavija is also listed, and from April 1996 only the address in Livno)
- Sarajevo: From May 1998 – Splitska 39; and from July 2002 – Zagrebačka 18
