= Mladen Veža =

Croatian painter (1916–2010)

- Born: 7 February 1916; Brist, Austria-Hungary
- Died: 19 February 2010 (aged 94); Zagreb, Croatia
- Known for: Painting

Mladen Veža (7 February 1916 – 19 February 2010) was a Croatian painter. He was born in Brist. He graduated from the Zagreb's Academy of Fine Arts under Vladimir Becić in 1937. He subsequently taught at the academy until 1981. In 1938 he was part of the first exhibition at the Home of Fine Arts Half a Century of Croatian Art, which was blessed by Archbishop Alojzije Stepinac and opened by Vladko Maček. He also took part in the IV Exhibition of Croatian Artists from the NDH in 1944.

He has had exhibitions in Zagreb, Beograd, Sisak, Maribor, Split, Brist, Sarajevo, Osijek, and Beirut. Veža has received many awards and honours, including the Vladimir Nazor Award in 1994.
