= Andrija Kačić Miošić =

Croatian poet and friar (1704–1760)

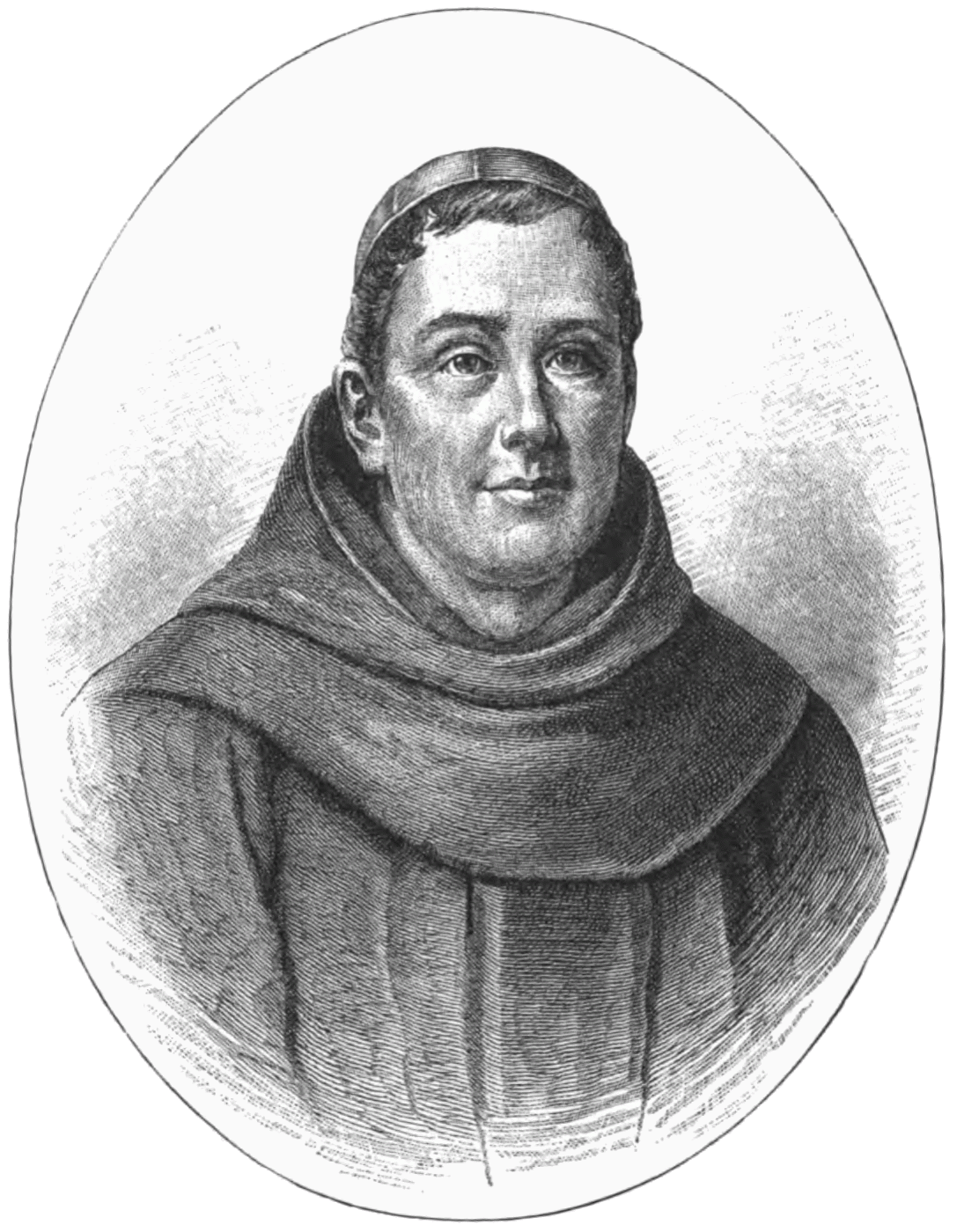
- Andrija Kačić Miošić
- Born: 17 April 1704; Brist, Republic of Venice
- Died: 14 December 1760 (aged 56)
- Education: Zaostrog monastery and Buda
- Occupation: Franciscan friar
- Writing career
- Notable works: Razgovor ugodni naroda slovinskoga (Pleasant Conversation of Slavic People, 1756), a history in verse
- Movement: Enlightenment

Andrija Kačić Miošić (pronounced [ǎndrija kâtʃitɕ mîoʃitɕ]; 17 April 1704 – 14 December 1760) was a Croatian writer, poet and Franciscan friar.

== Biography ==
Born as Ante in Brist near Makarska, he became a Franciscan friar at the Zaostrog monastery at the age of 16, assuming the name Andrew and serving the Franciscan province Bosna Argentina. He stemmed from the wealthy and powerful noble family Kačić and was educated at Zaostrog monastery and in Buda. In 1728 he was ordained a priest in Šibenik. From 1735 to 1745 he taught philosophy and theology in Šibenik as a regular lecturer. From 1745 to 1750 he stayed at the Sumartin monastery and then returned to Zaostrog, where he lived until his death in 1760.

== Works ==
His first written work was Elementa peripatethica juxta mentem subtilissimi doctoris Joannis Duns Scoti in 1752, a manual of scholastic philosophy based on the teachings of the Franciscan theologian and philosopher Duns Scotus.

His most important work is A Pleasant Conversation of the Slavic People (Croatian: Razgovor ugodni naroda slovinskog, 1756), a chronicle in verse and prose in the spirit of Enlightenment. The first edition of 1756 contained 41 poems while the second edition of 1759 was substantially expanded to 137 poems. It was the most popular book in the Croatian-speaking lands for more than a century.

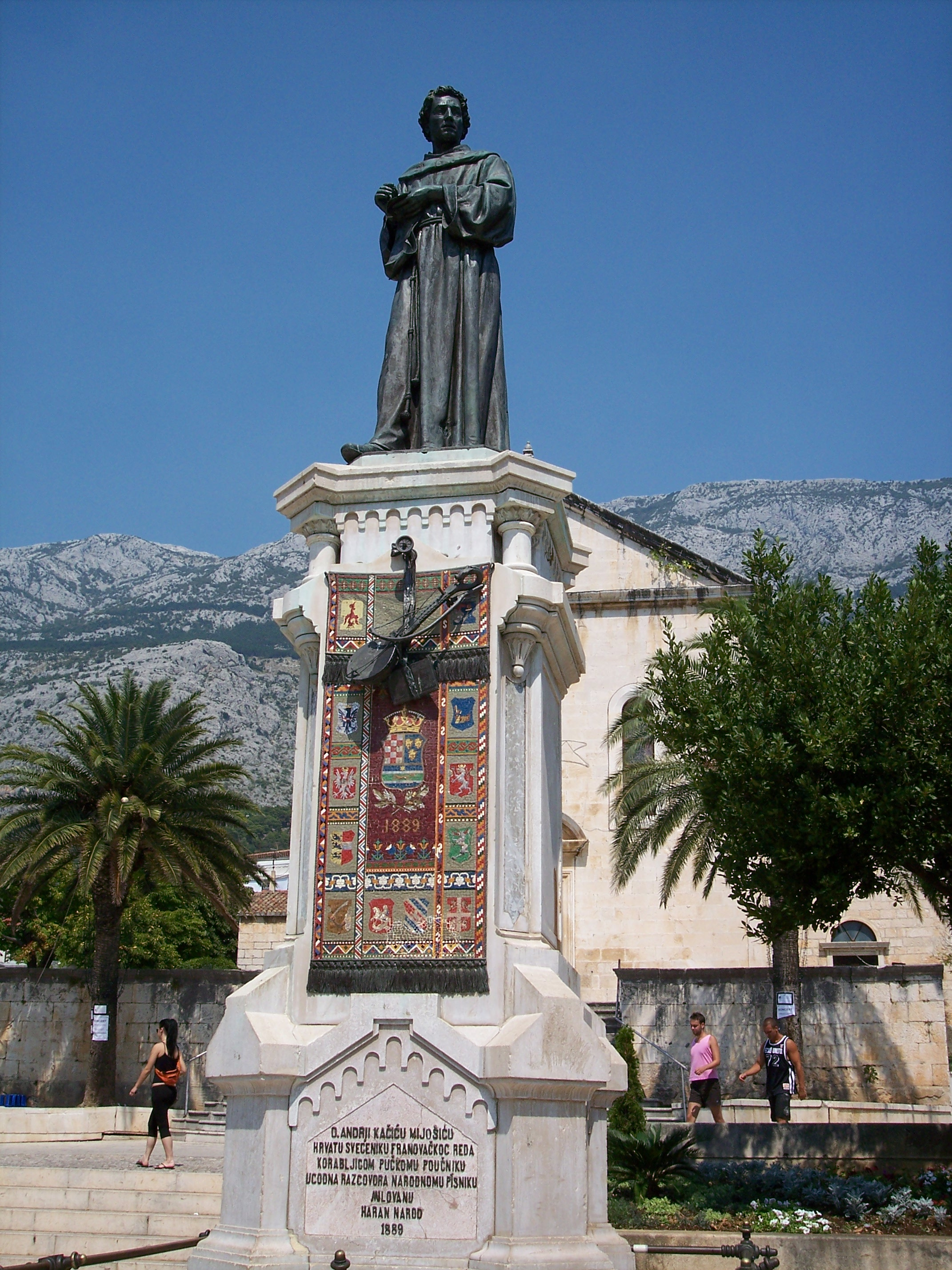
Statue of Andrija Kačić Miošić in Makarska

Using the ten-syllable verse of folk poetry and relying on Orbini, Farlati and Ritter-Vitezović, the book's main character old Milovan narrates and sings of the history of the Slavic peoples since Alexander the Great, whom he considered a Slav king. He always states his sources, Italian, Latin and Croatian chroniclers, and does some original research for the recent history, consulting municipal and monastery archives and citing witnesses such as old men and priests. Like Ivan Gundulić, he regarded South Slavs as one people. Since the book includes some important folk poems, many readers considered it a folk songbook, to be sung to the sound of the gusle.

His other work Korabljica (1760) is another chronicle in two parts, the first containing a history since the beginning of time until Christ, with tales in the style of the Old Testament; the second part is a summary chronicle relating to Southern Slavs.

Like Reljković, Ritter-Vitezović, and Obradović, he wrote in the vernacular Shtokavian dialect and was considered one founding father of Serbo-Croatian literature.
