= Krvavica, Croatia =

Coastal town in Croatia

Krvavica
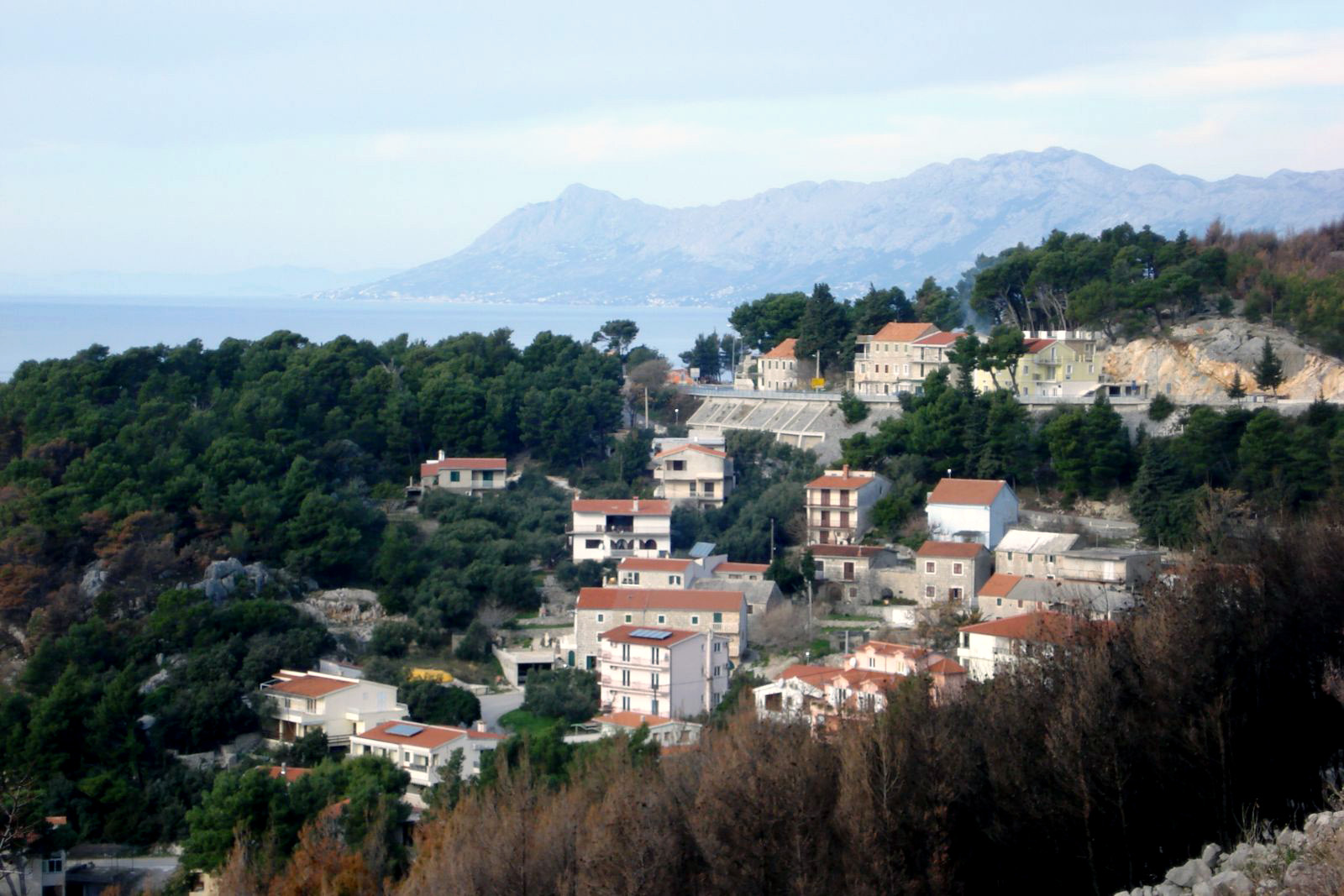
- Krvavica village around main coastal highway

- Location within Croatia
- Coordinates: 43°19′34″N 16°59′08″E
- Country: Croatia
- County: Split-Dalmatia
- Municipality: Baška Voda

Area
  - Total: 7.2 km^{2} (2.8 sq mi)

Population (2021)
  - Total: 312
  - Density: 43/km^{2} (110/sq mi)
- Time zone: UTC+1 (CET)
  - Summer (DST): UTC+2 (CEST)

Krvavica is coastal locality in southern Dalmatia, Croatia, administratively part of Baška Voda municipality. Its name is first mentioned in 1792. with the first settlements. Symbol of Krvavice is Ključ kuk, the tall rock above the locality.

== Population ==
According to 2021 data in Krvavica and neighbouring Bratuš lives 320 inhabitants.

== Traffic ==
Krvavica is on the Adriatic main coastal road. There is a walkway promenade along the sea front 4 km in length to Makarska and 6 km to Baška Voda.

== Cultural heritage ==
The Children's Maritime Health Resort of Military Insured Persons designed by the architect Rikard Marasović was built in 1963–1964. The complex of a health resort is characterized by a unique circular architecture building situated by the sea, inside the pine forest – features considered beneficial for the construction of a health resort. The complex represents unique modernist heritage for its shape and integration within the nature and is listed as cultural heritage.

== Economy ==
Economy revolves around tourism, due to high number of sunny days and beaches. Touristic facility built in 1960 is no longer functional, but tourists can rent with renters of smaller family apartment or local camp. On the coast there is also a marina.

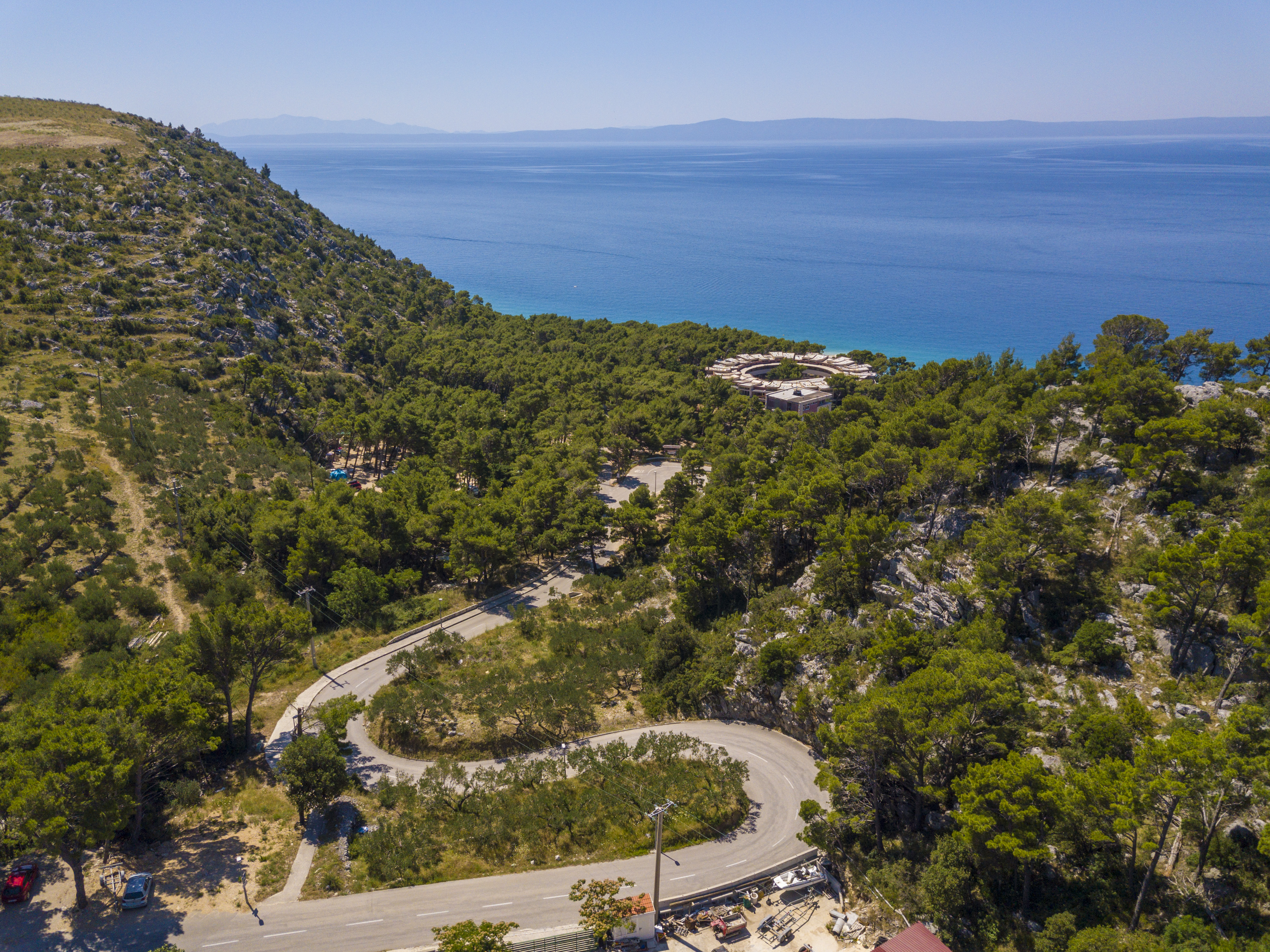
top down view to the beach
