= Ante Kosovich =

Ante Kosovich (5 November 1879–24 February 1958) was a New Zealand gum-digger, balladeer, poet and writer, born in Zaostrog, Croatia.

In 1907 Kosovich published eight lengthy poems, entitled 'From the Dalmatian in exile', reprinted in Split, Dalmatia in 1908. The poems reflect experiences of his compatriots before acceptance in New Zealand. A long poem by Kosovich appeared in Napredak, the Auckland Croatian-language newspaper and addressed 'To the Croatian people' appealing to their patriotism.
