= Gradac, Split-Dalmatia County =

Municipality in Split-Dalmatia County, Croatia

Gradac
- Municipality
- Općina Gradac; Gradac Municipality
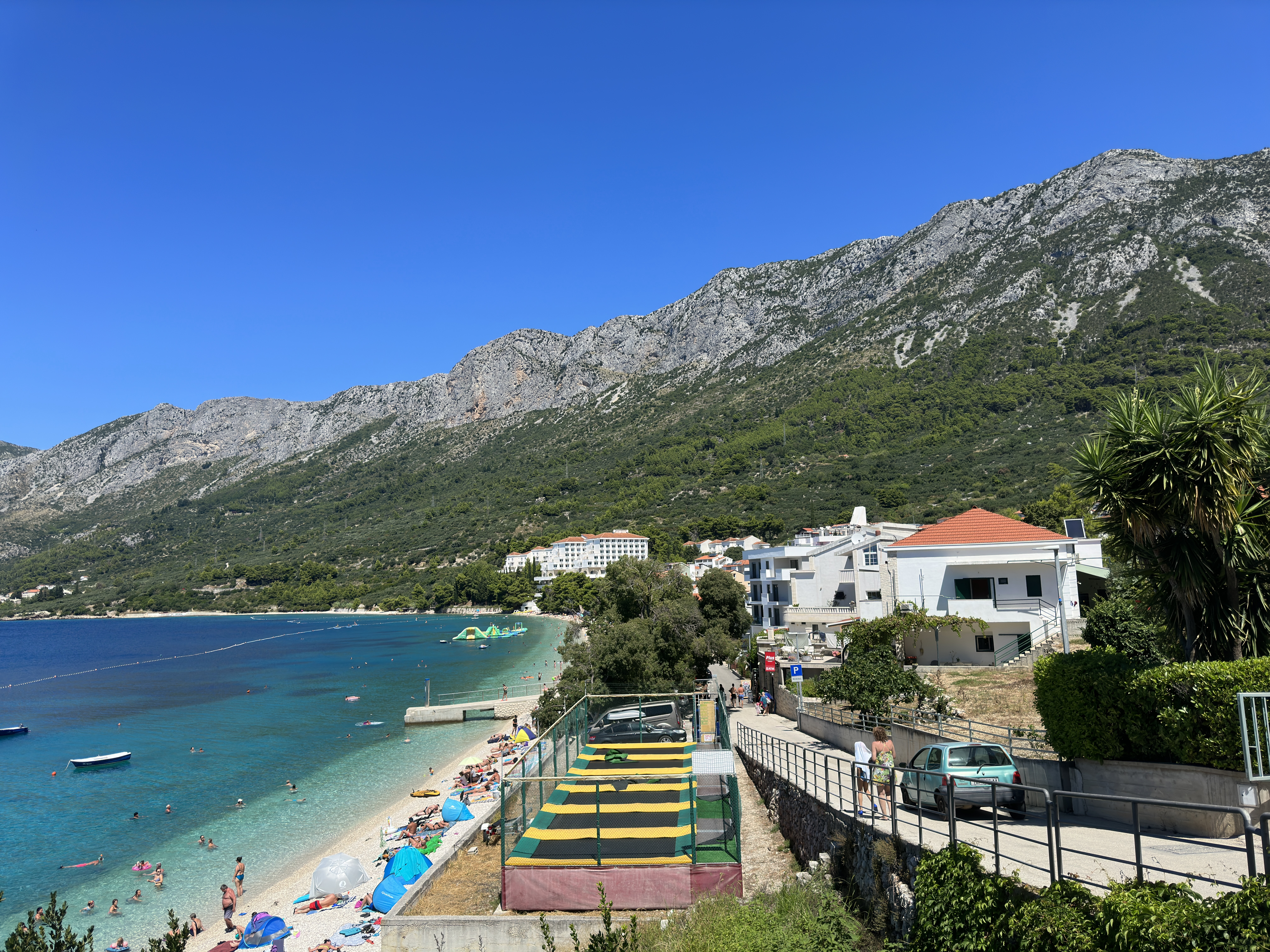
- Gradac

- Location of Gradac within Croatia
- Coordinates: 43°06′17″N 17°20′28″E
- Country: Croatia
- Region: Dalmatia
- County: Split-Dalmatia County

Government
  - Municipal mayor: Matko Burić (SDP)
  - Municipal Council: 13 members: • SDP (7); • HDZ (5); • Independent (1)

Area
  - Municipality: 72.1 km^{2} (27.8 sq mi)
  - Urban: 12.6 km^{2} (4.9 sq mi)

Population (2021)
  - Municipality: 2,401
  - Density: 33.3/km^{2} (86.2/sq mi)
  - Urban: 989
  - Urban density: 78.5/km^{2} (203/sq mi)
- Time zone: UTC+1 (CET)
  - Summer (DST): UTC+2 (CEST)
- Postal code: 21300
- Area code: 021
- Website: opcinagradac.hr

Gradac (pronounced [ɡrǎːdats]), is a municipality in southern Dalmatia, Croatia. It is situated halfway between Split and Dubrovnik. The town of Ploče is 12 km south of Gradac, while the town of Makarska is 42 km north.

The municipality, consisting of the coastal settlements Drvenik, Zaostrog, Podaca, Brist and Gradac itself, marks the end of the riviera and the county.

== Demographics ==
The municipality has a very low density of permanent population (mostly native to Dalmatia, or the rest of Croatia and neighboring Bosnia and Herzegovina), with a handful of people outside of the region.

In 2021, the municipality had 2,401 residents in the following 5 settlements:

- Brist, population 351
- Drvenik, population 420
- Gradac, population 989
- Podaca, population 421
- Zaostrog, population 220
Gradac: Population trends 1857–2021
v

population	2432	2689	2772	3162	3339	3453	3366	3002	2202	2079	2015	2271	2317	2567	3615	3261	2401
	1857	1869	1880	1890	1900	1910	1921	1931	1948	1953	1961	1971	1981	1991	2001	2011	2021

Sources: Croatian Bureau of Statistics publications

== History ==
The Gradac area was inhabited before prehistoric times. Numerous stone mounds dating back to the Bronze and Early Iron Ages have been found in the area. In Roman times, the Gradac area was most likely the seat of the Roman civitas Biston, which as a coastal center belonged to the colony of Narona, an important Roman stronghold on what is now Croatian territory.

At the locality of Gradina a cornice fragment of the monumental building from the 2nd-3rd century was found, as well as Roman coin pieces. Near the Laguna hotel were found many tombs, hence it is thought that on this location there was once a Roman necropolis.

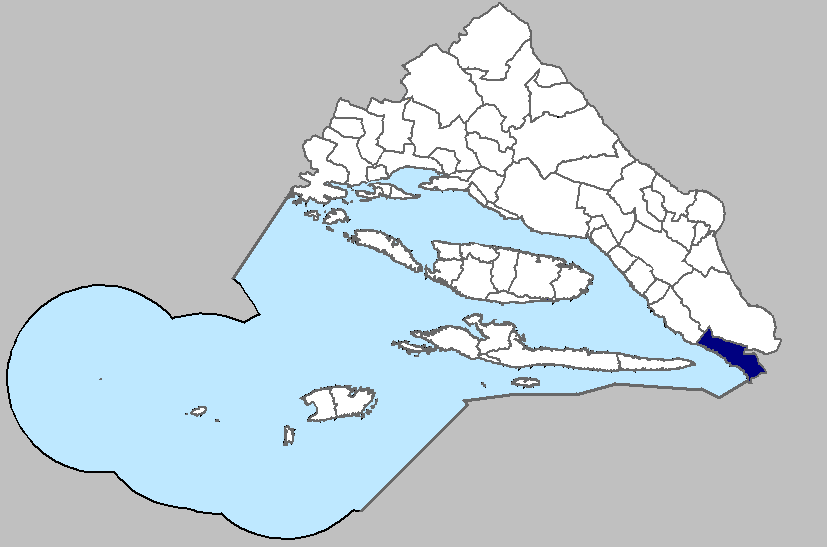
Image of Gradac Municipality within the Split County

The medieval town of Lapčan, or Labinac, which, under the name of Labineca, was mentioned by the Byzantine emperor Constantine VII Porphyrogenitus, mid-10th century, was situated on the territory of today's Gradac.

Under its present name, Gradac was mentioned for the first time in 1649. It was named after the stronghold that was situated on the elevation above the present-day church of St. Michael, and which was built probably during the Cretan War (1645–1669) as a defence against the Ottoman Empire. According to the drawing made by the Venetian military engineer and cartographer Giuseppe Santini, representing the naval and continental battles between the Venetians and Ottomans at Gradac in the year 1666, the tower is shown in flames.

== Culture ==
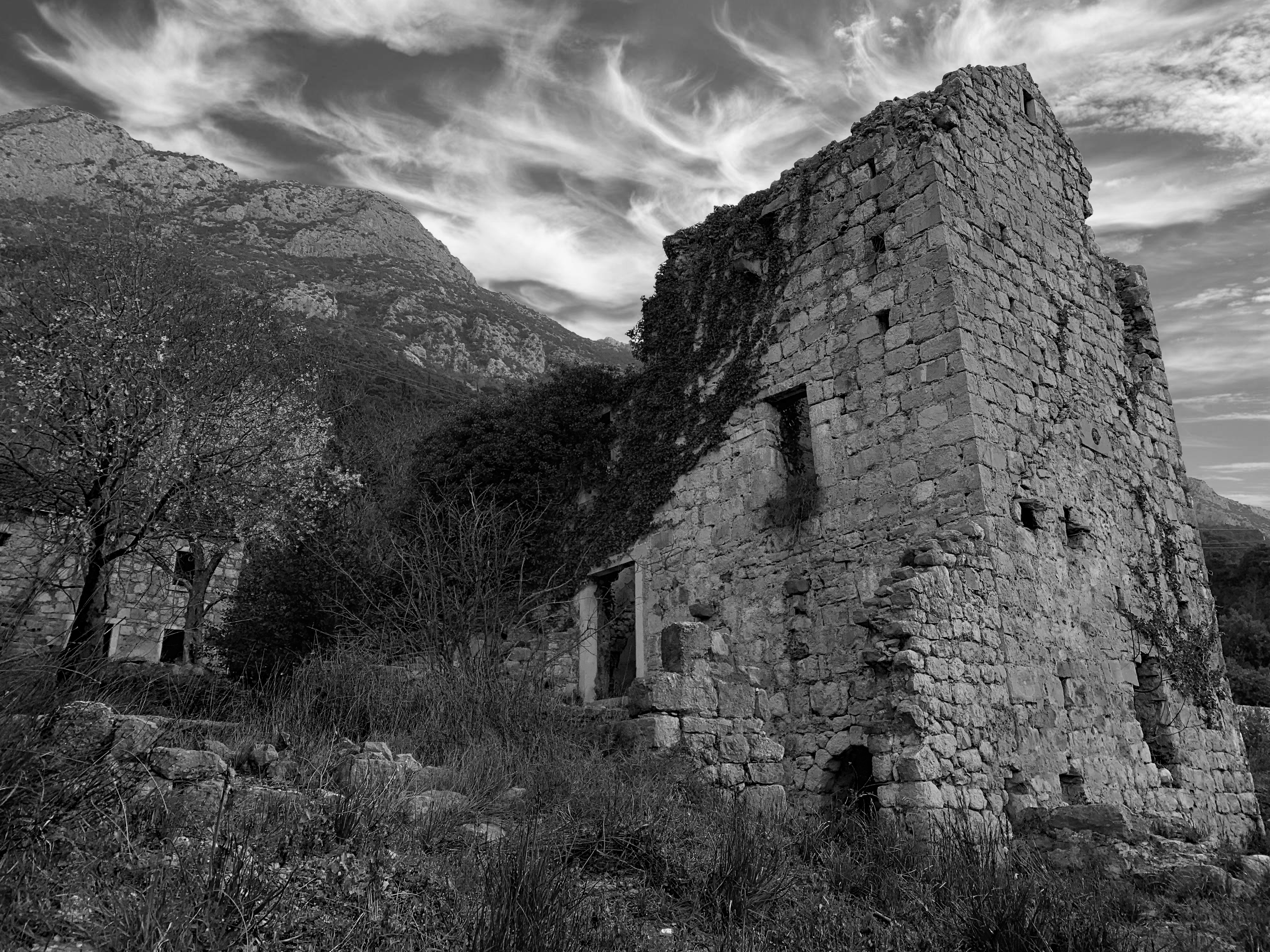
Village of Čista above Gradac

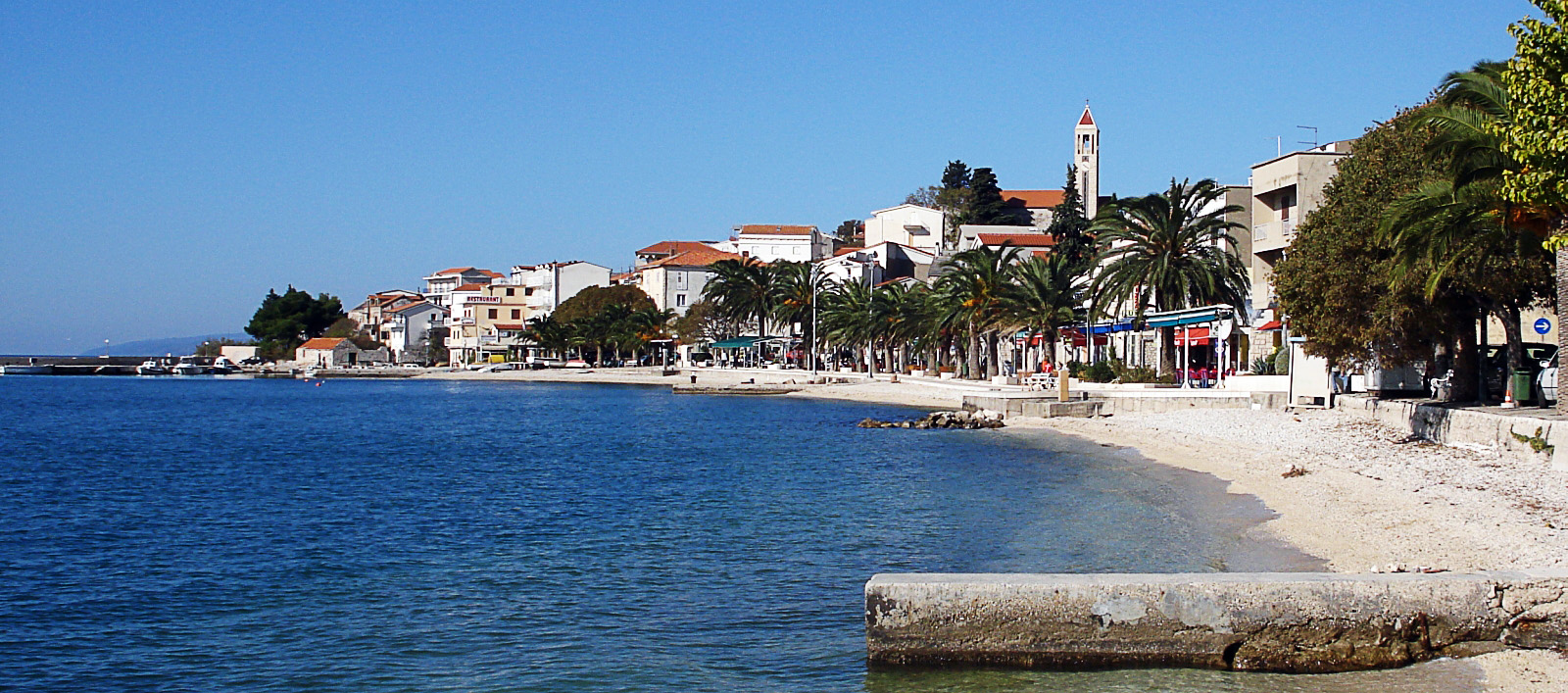
Gradac view at central part of the beach, promenade, harbor

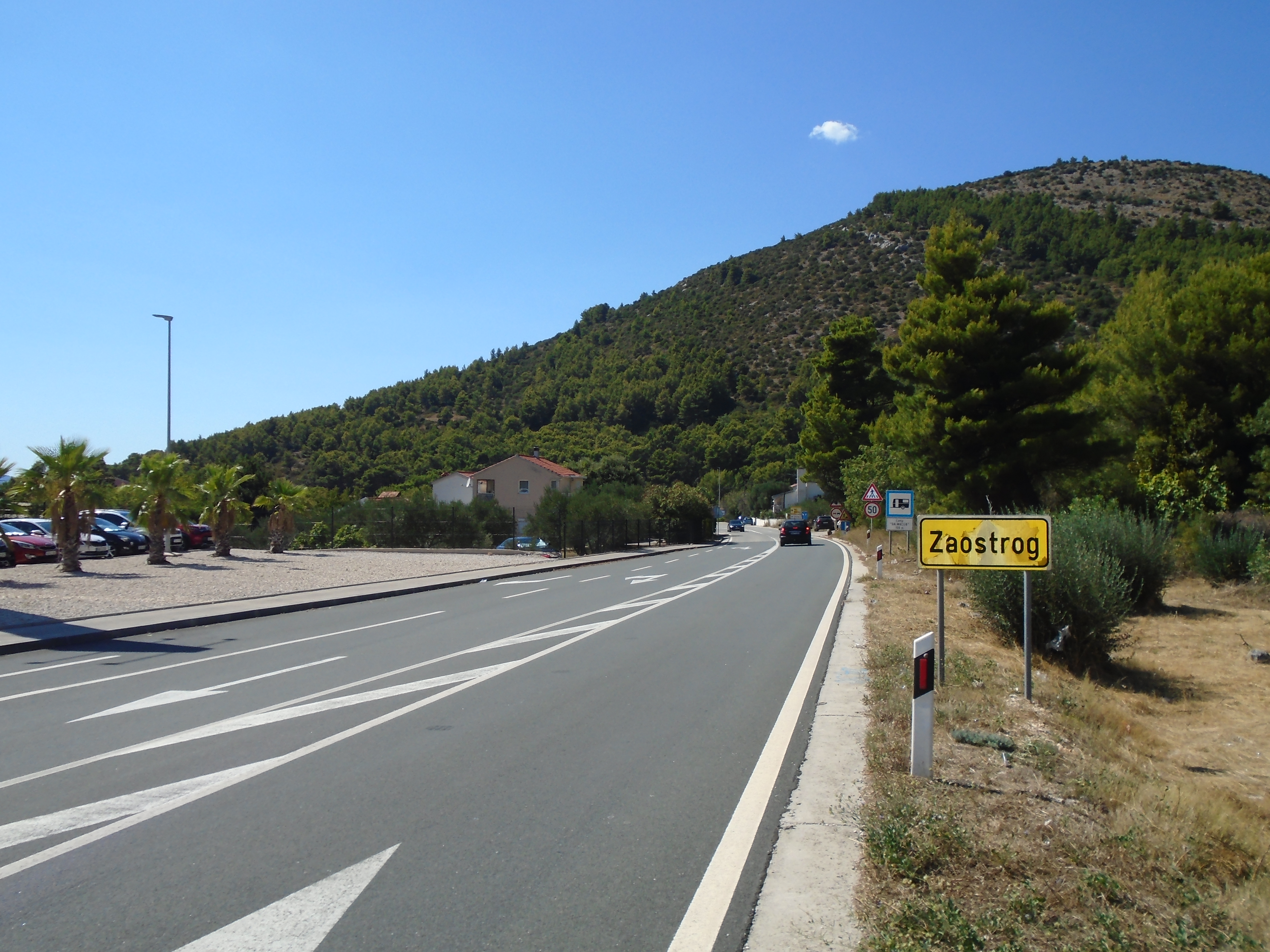
Zaostrog village road entrance

The remnants of the old tower from the 16th century can be found in the abandoned village of Čista above Gradac, the seat of the ancient Fragostin's district.

Surrounding it are still the remnants of rows of abandoned houses with typical architectonic features of the region. One of the oldest existing edifices in the territory of Gradac is the chapel of St. Pasquale on the Mt. Plana, with a barrel shaped vault, and a saddle roof.

Next to the old parish church of St. Antonio there is a local cemetery and the new parish church of St. Michael built in 1852, precisely in the zone of Gradina, the ancient Roman locality. In the church, there are three marble altars with statues. The most interesting among them is the old wooden statue of St. Rocco. In the church there is also the old baptismal stone font, originating probably from the old church.

Gradac is very well known for it antifascist and partisan history. Gradac has a memorial to citizens killed fighting for the Yugoslav Partisans during World War II. Before war in the 1990s, Gradac had a memorial statue of an unknown soldier made by well-known Croatian sculptor Antun Augustinčić dedicated to partisan uprising during Second World War. It was destroyed in 1992.

== See also ==
- Biokovo
- Baćina lakes
