= Igrane =

- Town
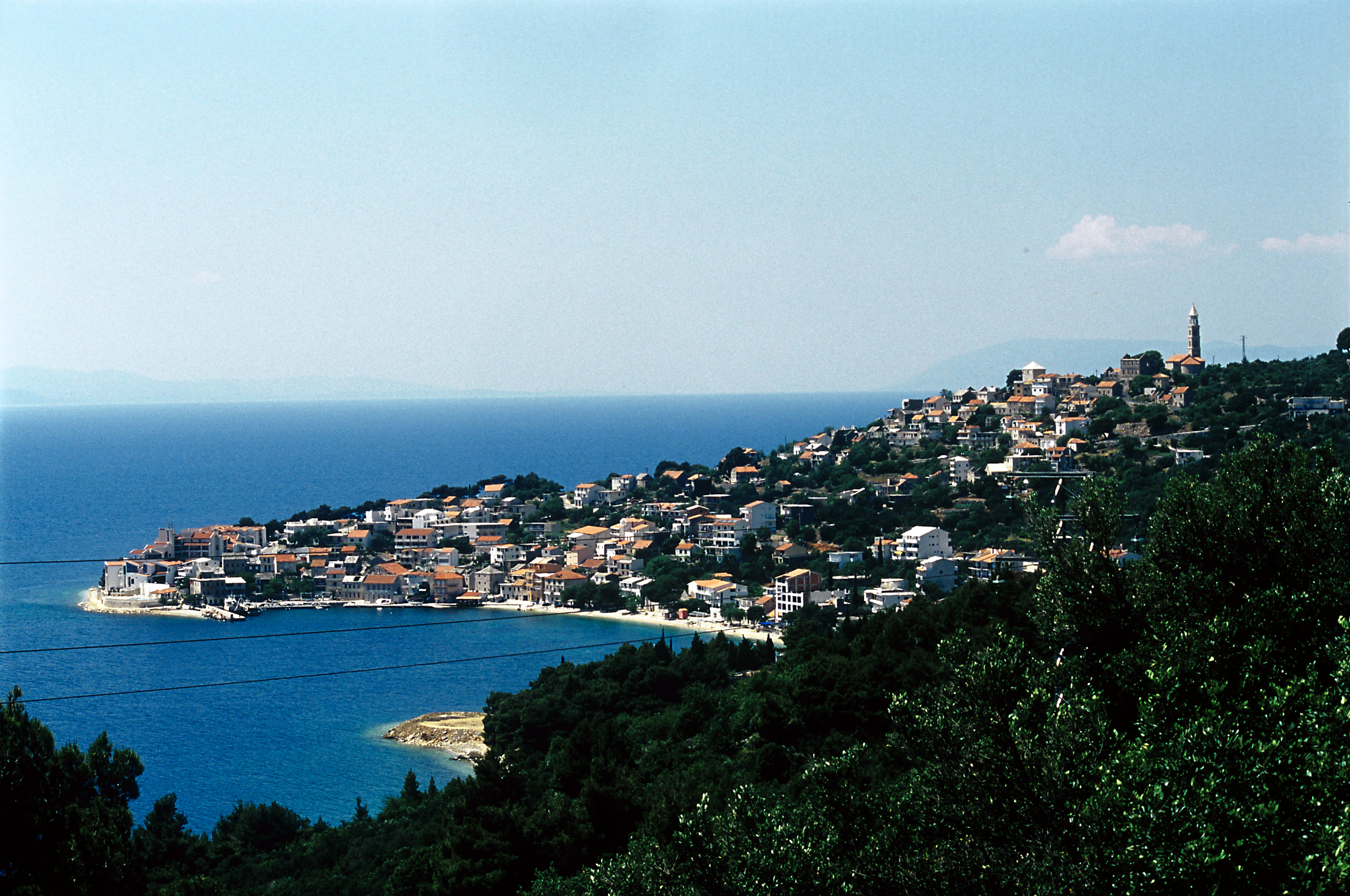
- Igrane

- Coat of arms

- Location of Igrane in Croatia
- Coordinates: 43.195°N 17.139°E
- Country: Croatia
- County: Split-Dalmatia

Area
  - Total: 3.1 km^{2} (1.2 sq mi)

Population (2021)
  - Total: 347
  - Density: 110/km^{2} (290/sq mi)
- Time zone: UTC+1 (CET)
  - Summer (DST): UTC+2 (CEST)
- Postal code: 21392
- Area code: 02

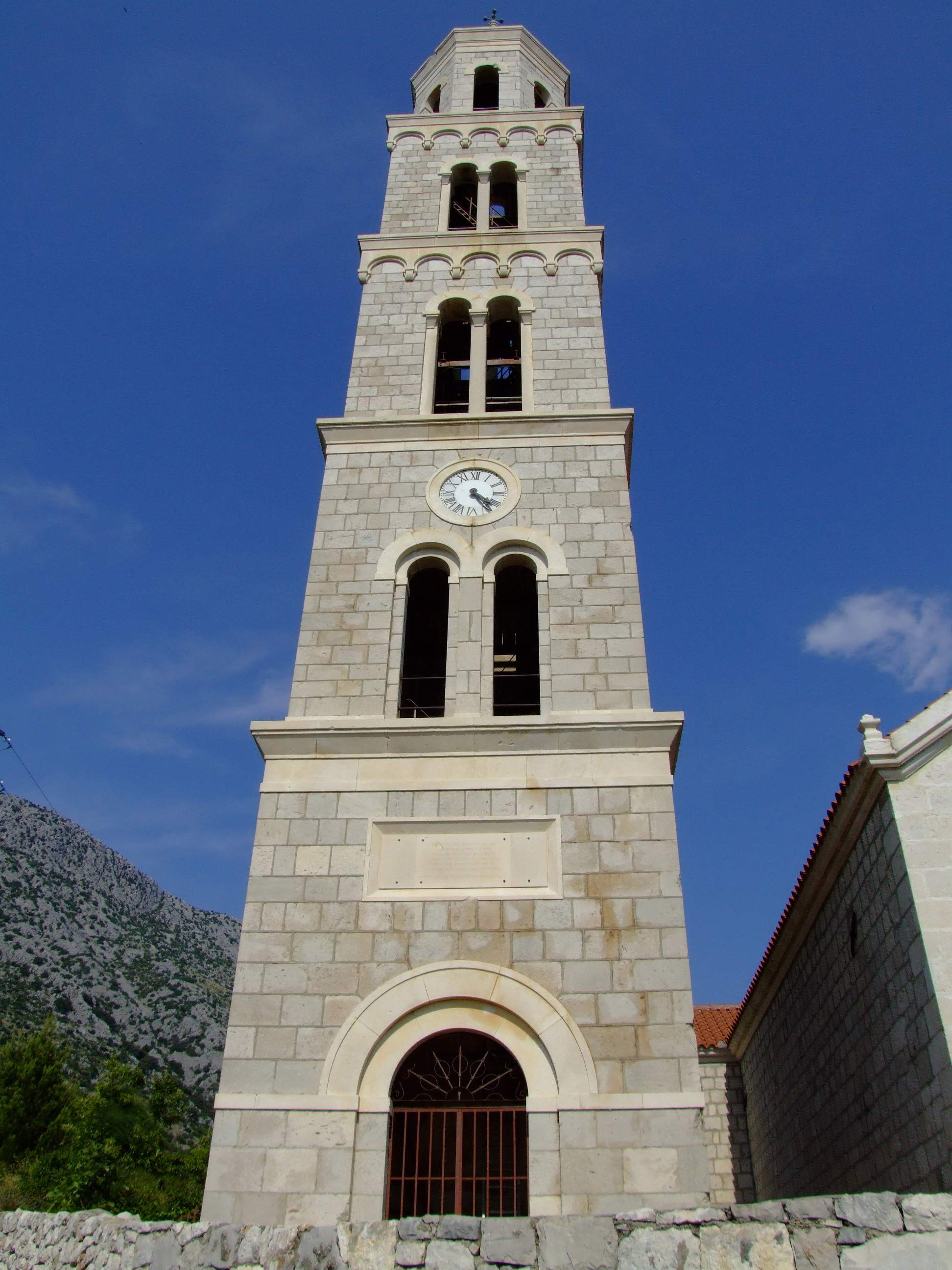
Neoclassical bell tower

Igrane is a town in Croatia, around 19 km south from Makarska. It has about 420 inhabitants.

At the highest point of the village is the "Kula Zale" tower - named after Ivan Anticic, and built during the 17th century as a protection against Turks. The Pre-Romanesque church of St. Michael (Sveti Mihovil), dating from the 11th century, dominates the village.

Tourism and agriculture are the main sources of income for the inhabitants.
