= Promajna =

Settlement in Split-Dalmatia County, Croatia

- Settlement
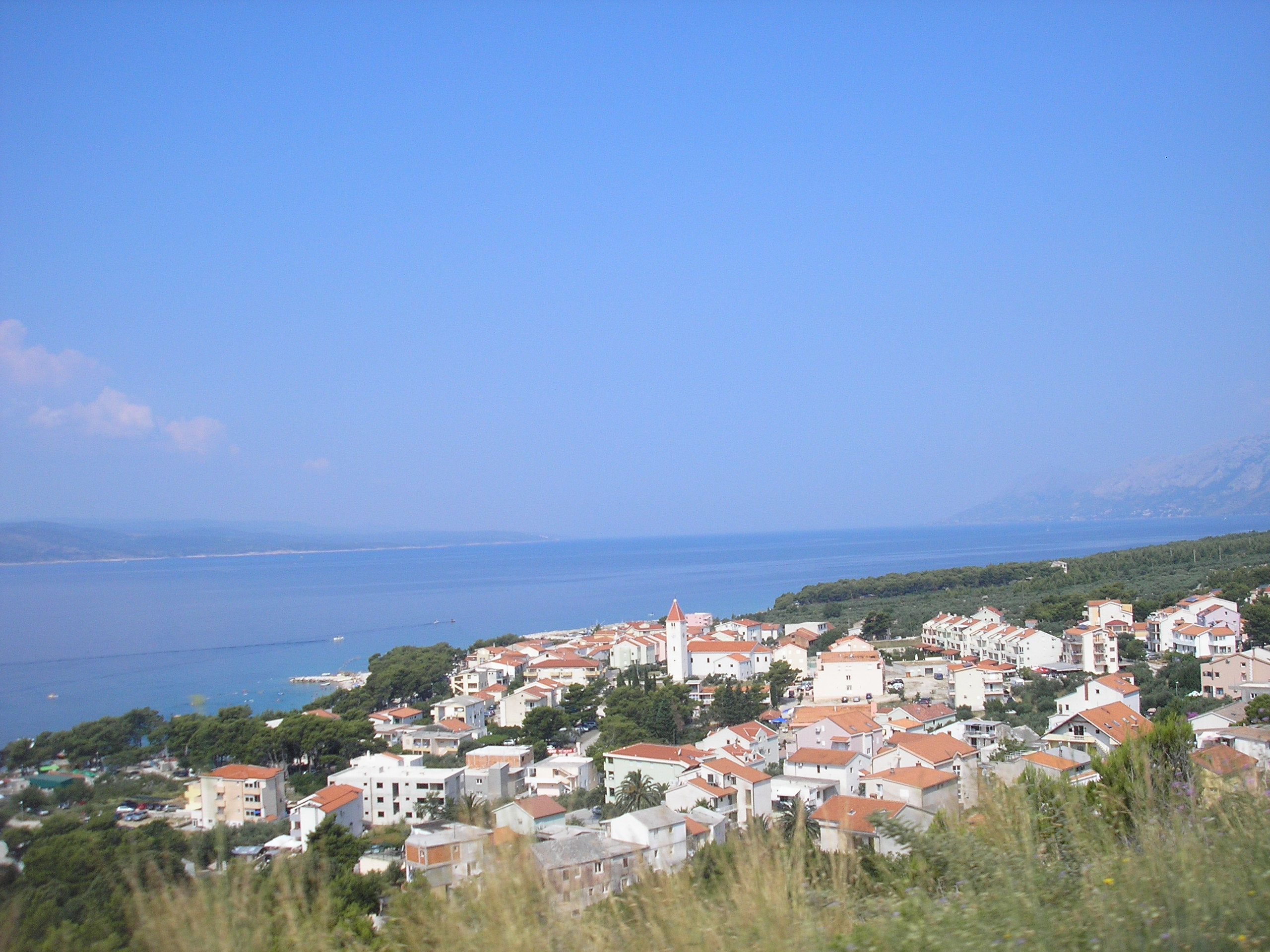
- Interactive map of Promajna
- Location of Promajna in Croatia
- Coordinates: 43°20′06″N 16°58′19″E
- Country: Croatia
- County: Split-Dalmatia
- Municipality: Baška Voda

Area
  - Total: 4.8 km^{2} (1.9 sq mi)

Population (2021)
  - Total: 378
  - Density: 79/km^{2} (200/sq mi)
- Time zone: UTC+1 (CET)
  - Summer (DST): UTC+2 (CEST)
- Postal code: 21320 Baška Voda
- Area code: +385 (0)21

Promajna is a village in the Municipality of Baška Voda in Croatia. In 2021, its population was 378.

== Demographics ==
Promajna: Population trends 1857–2021
v

population			47	46	68	101		93	97	124	126	176	185	231	456	357	378
	1857	1869	1880	1890	1900	1910	1921	1931	1948	1953	1961	1971	1981	1991	2001	2011	2021

Sources: Croatian Bureau of Statistics publications
