= Baška Voda =

Municipality in Split-Dalmatia County, Croatia

- Municipality
- Općina Baška Voda
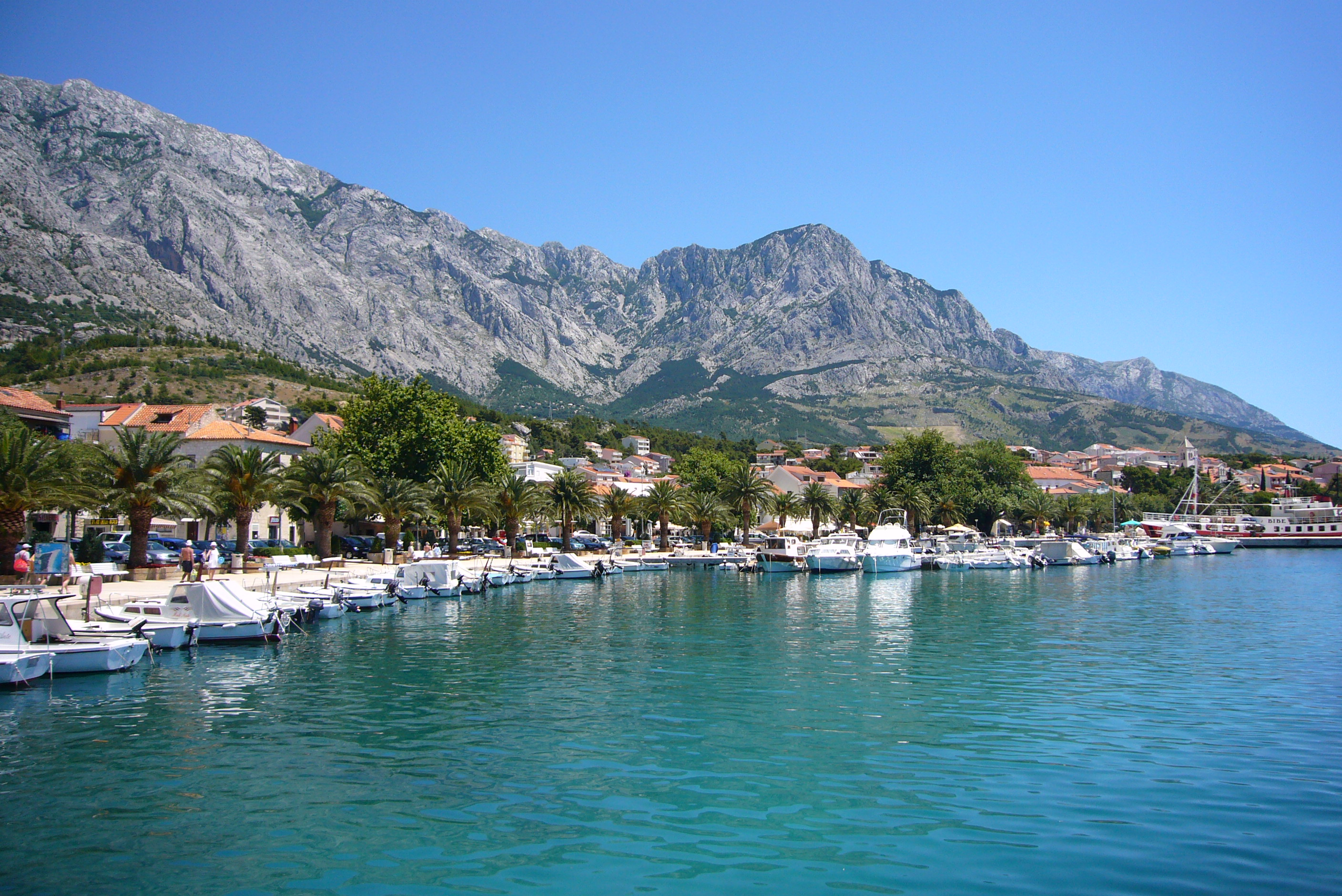

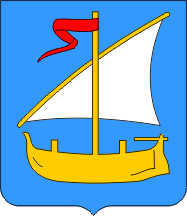
- Coat of arms

- Location in Croatia Baška Voda (Croatia)
- Coordinates: 43°21′27″N 16°56′57″E
- Country: Croatia
- Region: Dalmatia
- County: Split-Dalmatia County

Area
  - Municipality: 25.7 km^{2} (9.9 sq mi)
  - Urban: 9.9 km^{2} (3.8 sq mi)

Population (2021)
  - Municipality: 2,590
  - Density: 101/km^{2} (261/sq mi)
  - Urban: 1,766
  - Urban density: 180/km^{2} (460/sq mi)
- Time zone: UTC+1 (CET)
  - Summer (DST): UTC+2 (CEST)
- Website: opcinabaskavoda.hr

Baška Voda (pronounced [bâʃkaː vɔ̌da]) is a village and a municipality in Croatia in the Split-Dalmatia County.

It is located on the Adriatic coastline of Dalmatia, 10 kilometres (6.2 mi) northwest of Makarska.

== Population ==
In the 2011 census, it had a total population of 2,775, in the following settlements:

- Bast, population 126
- Baška Voda, population 1,978
- Krvavica, population 314
- Promajna, population 357

In the same census, 96.2% of the population were Croats.

Baška Voda: Population trends 1857–2021
v

population	810	930	998	1178	1365	1548	1548	1648	1646	1645	1572	1870	1931	2173	2924	2775	2590
	1857	1869	1880	1890	1900	1910	1921	1931	1948	1953	1961	1971	1981	1991	2001	2011	2021

Sources: Croatian Bureau of Statistics publications

== Climate ==
Baška Voda has a Mediterranean climate with an average of 2,700 sunny hours per year, making it one of the sunniest parts of northern Mediterranean.

== History ==
The name Baška Voda is mythological in origin and is linked with Biston, the patriarch of the Thracian Biston tribe, son of Ares, the Greek god of war, and the goddess Calliope, protectress of water. The military fort and springs near Baška Voda bear out this theory. Some of the richest archaeological sites that have yielded finds from Roman times are on the heights of Gradina and its surroundings.

These include burial sites with urns, lamps, jewellery, coins with the head of Alexander Severus Aurelianus and headstones bearing the names of 13 of the ancient inhabitants of Baška Voda, the loveliest of which commemorates a boy called Ursinus, who died in a shipwreck between 100 and 150 AD.

In ancient times, the little village of Bast nestled by a freshwater spring which supplied the Biokovo area. During the 18th century, after the expulsion of the Turks, its inhabitant left the slopes of St. Ilija's (Elijah's) Ridge and descended to the shore, where they established Baška Voda, today a well-known tourist resort on the Makarska Riviera.

Baška Voda first appeared on the “Coranelli” geographical map, produced in 1688, as “Basca”. It was a small village which thrived on agriculture and fishing. The Late Baroque church of St. Lovro (Laurence), built in 1750, probably occupies an Antique site, while the parish church of St. Nikola (Nicholas), the patron saint of travellers and sailors, was built in the early 20th century.

The town along with its surroundings appear in the video game Gran Turismo Sport as a fictional racetrack.

== Image gallery ==
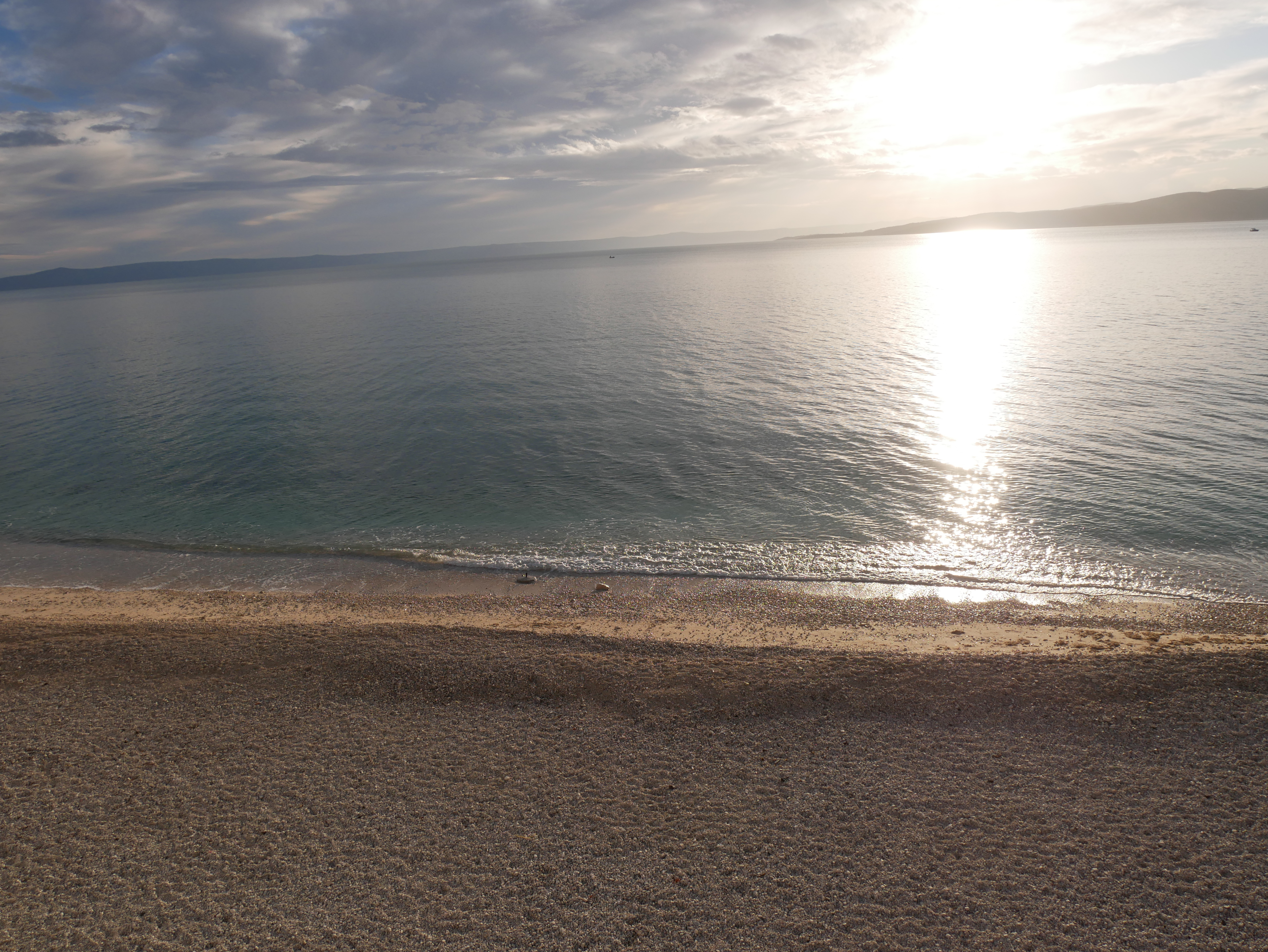
Beach

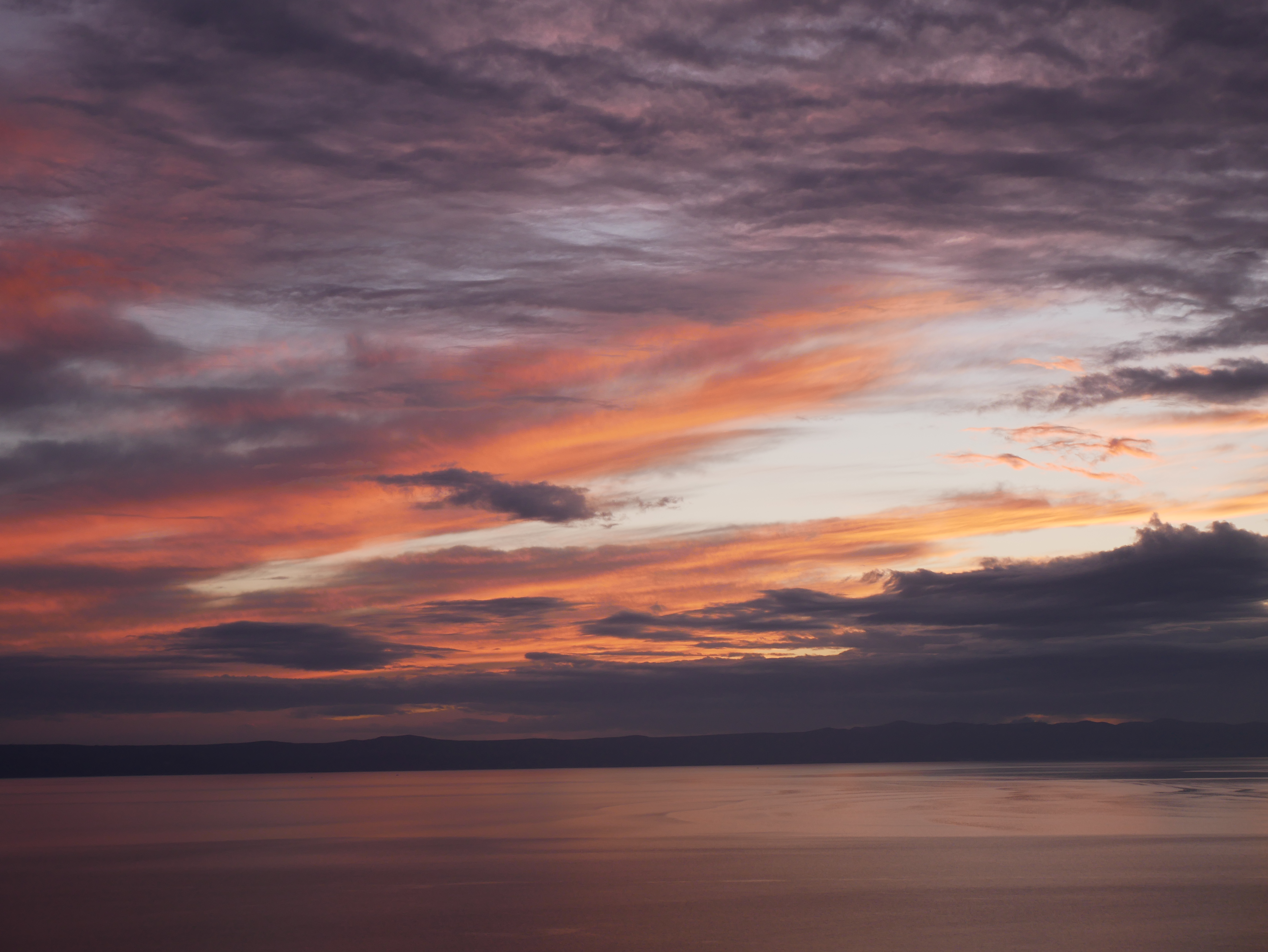
Baska voda sunset

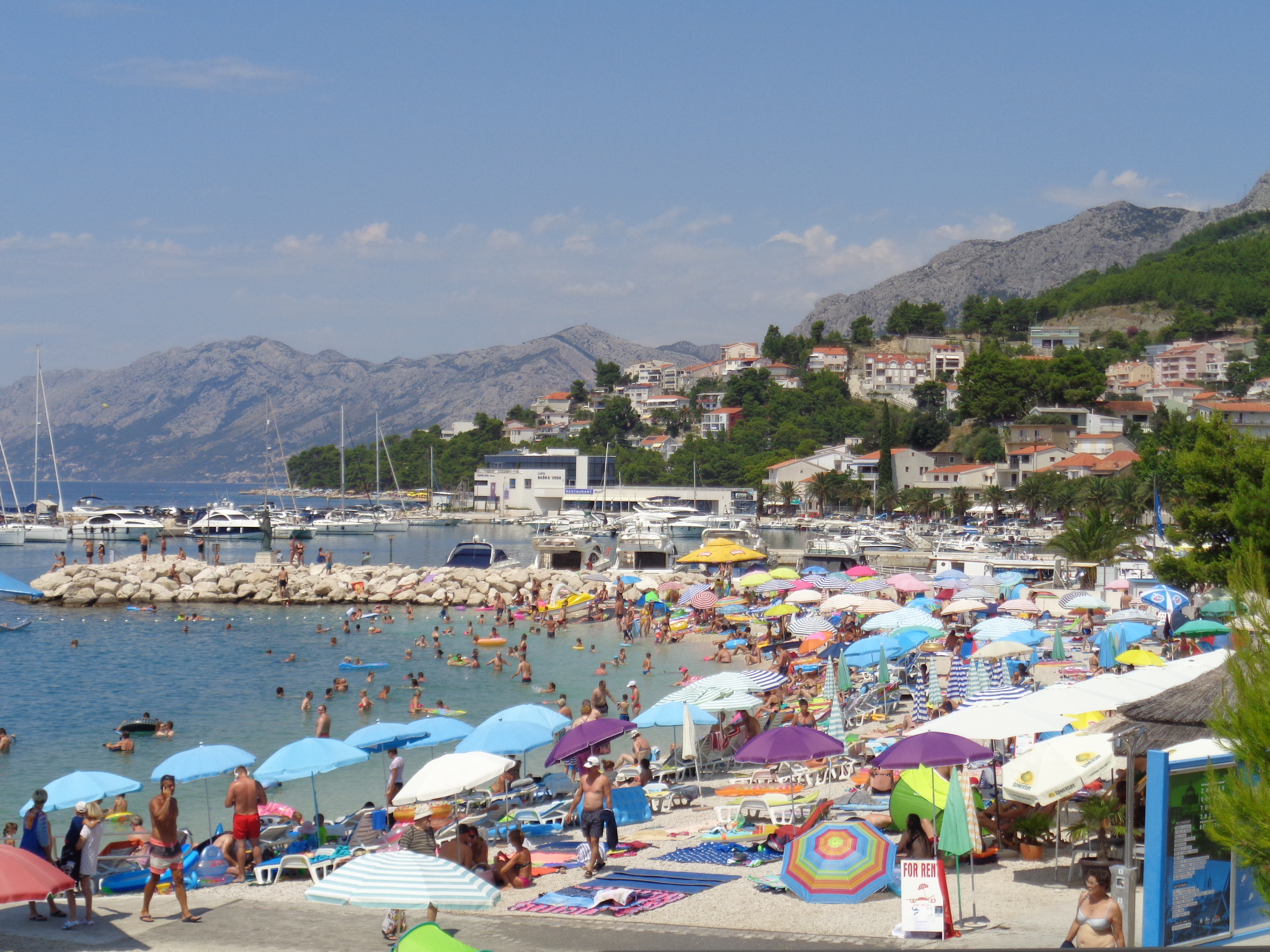
Beach full of bathers

Small port in Baška voda

Long beach of Baška voda

== Sources ==
- Šimunović, Petar (March 2013). "Predantički toponimi u današnjoj (i povijesnoj) Hrvatskoj" [Pre-Roman placenames in present-day (and historical) Croatia] (PDF). Folia Onomastica Croatica (in Croatian) (22). Zagreb: Croatian Academy of Sciences and Arts: 147–214.
