= Bratuš =

Coordinates: 43°19′41″N 16°58′37″E

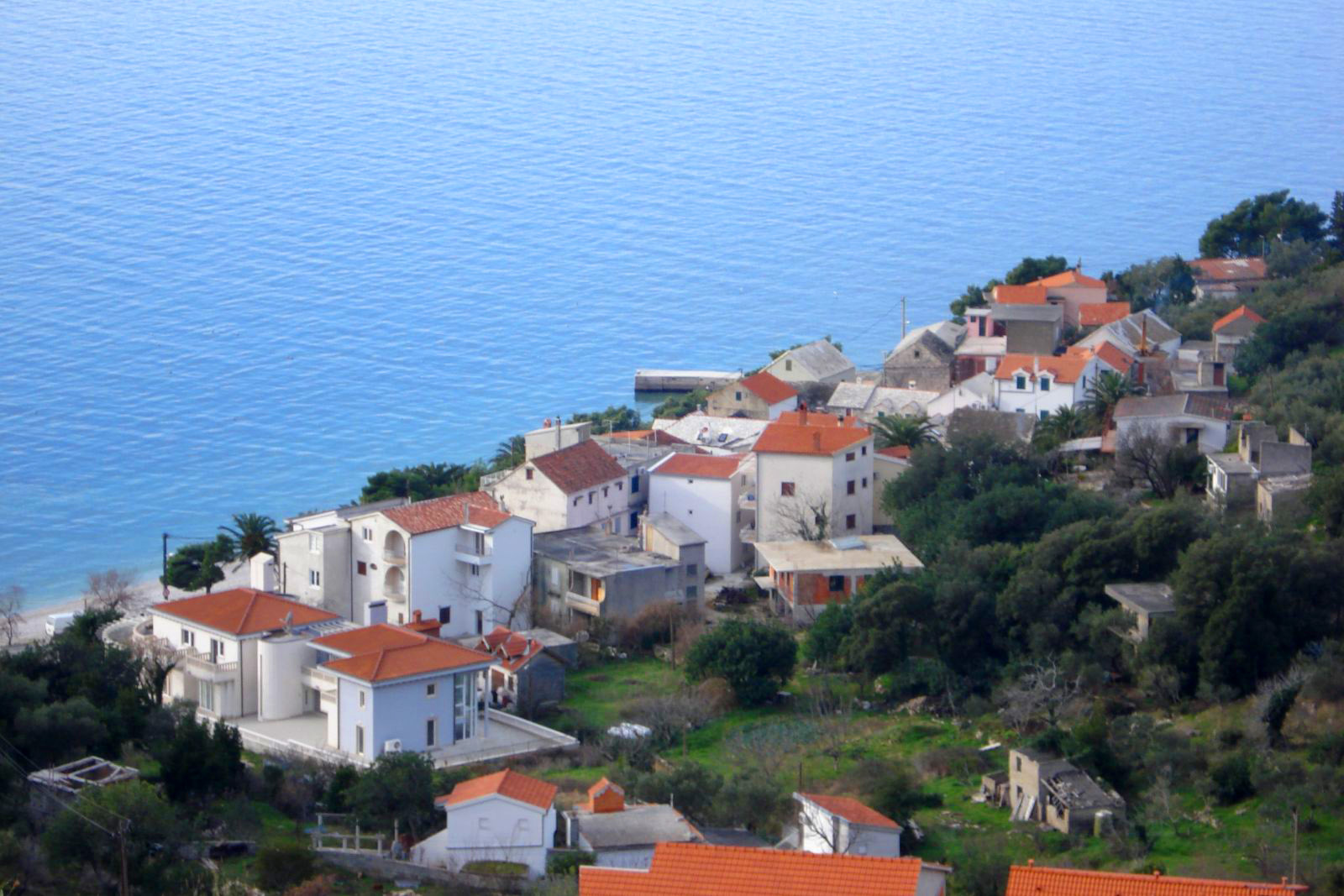
Bratuš, a village in Baška Voda municipality.

Bratuš is a village in Central Dalmatia, Croatia close to the city of Makarska. It is a small fishing and tourist village with fewer than 50 inhabitants outside the holiday season.

Close to the main tourist hub Makarska, Bratuš has managed to preserve its original atmosphere of a small fishing community.

Bratuš is mentioned for the first time in historical documents from 1674. Above the village, small prehistoric ruins with the name 'Gradina' can be found.
