= Zaostrog =

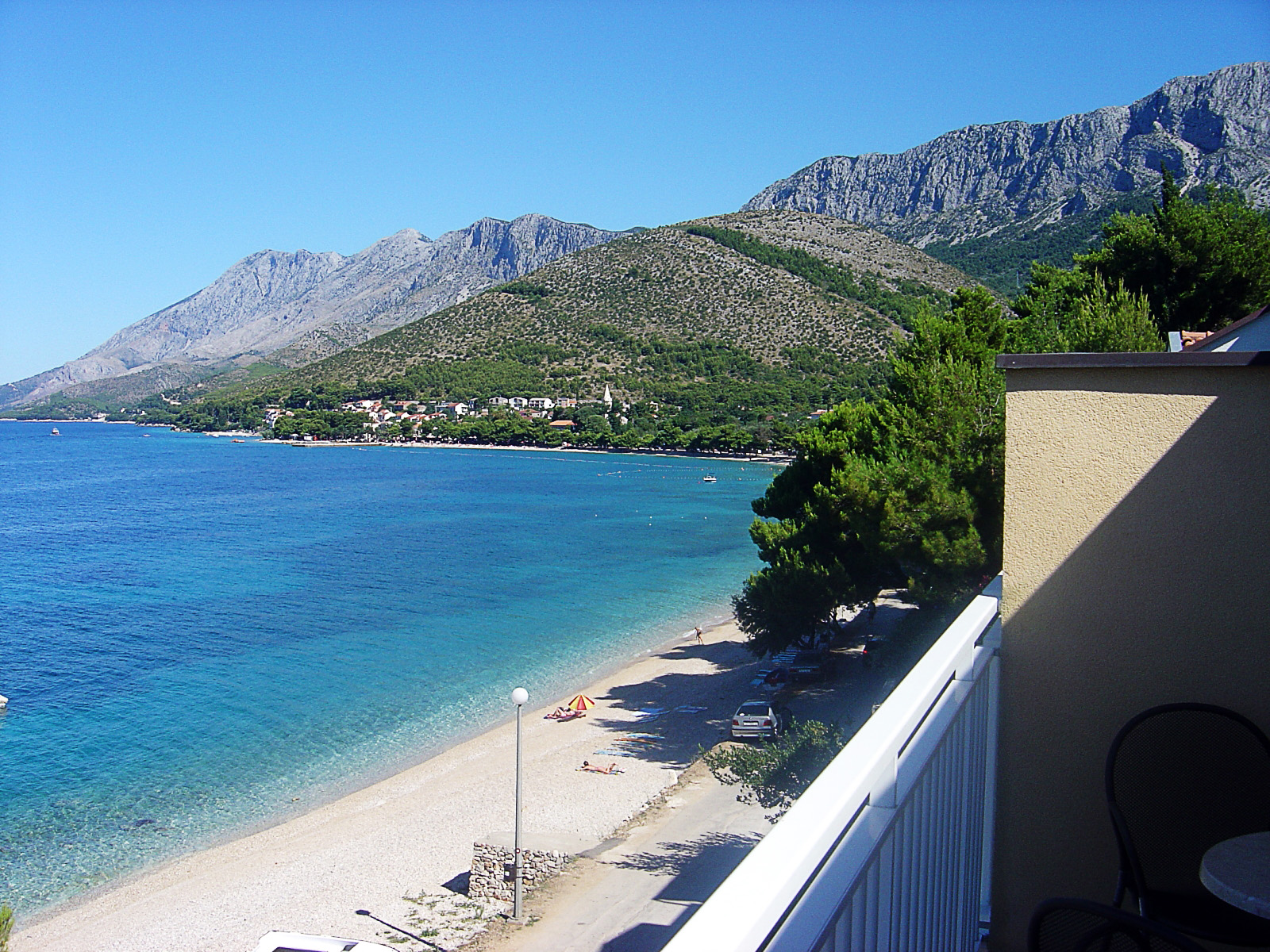

- Location within Croatia
- Coordinates: 43°08′30″N 17°16′45″E
- Country: Croatia
- County: Split-Dalmatia
- Municipality: Gradac

Area
  - Total: 16.4 km^{2} (6.3 sq mi)

Population (2021)
  - Total: 220
  - Density: 13/km^{2} (35/sq mi)
- Time zone: UTC+1 (CET)
  - Summer (DST): UTC+2 (CEST)

Zaostrog (Croatian pronunciation: [zâostroːg]) is a tourist town and harbor along the Adriatic Sea in southern Dalmatia, Croatia. It is located between Makarska and Ploče. It consists of two parts, an older part below a steep limestone section of the Biokovo mountain range, and a newer coastal zone. Olive growing is prominent in the area.

The village is the location of the Franciscan monastery of St. Mary, which is more than 500 years old and has an open museum, ethnological collection, gallery and a large library with over 30,000 titles, a significant part of the older Croatian literature. The settlement today co-locates with the Narentine settlement of Ostrok in Pagania.

The monk Andrija Kačić Miošić, known as "The Old Man Milovan", spent part of his creative life in Zaostrog. He is one of the most prominent Croatian folk poets. Zaostrog was called "Ostrog" in the Middle Ages and was one of the larger towns of the Narentines.

== Prominent people ==
- Ante Kosovich, 19th century poet from diaspora in New Zealand

== See also ==
- Dalmatia
- Makarska
- Gradac
