= Brist =

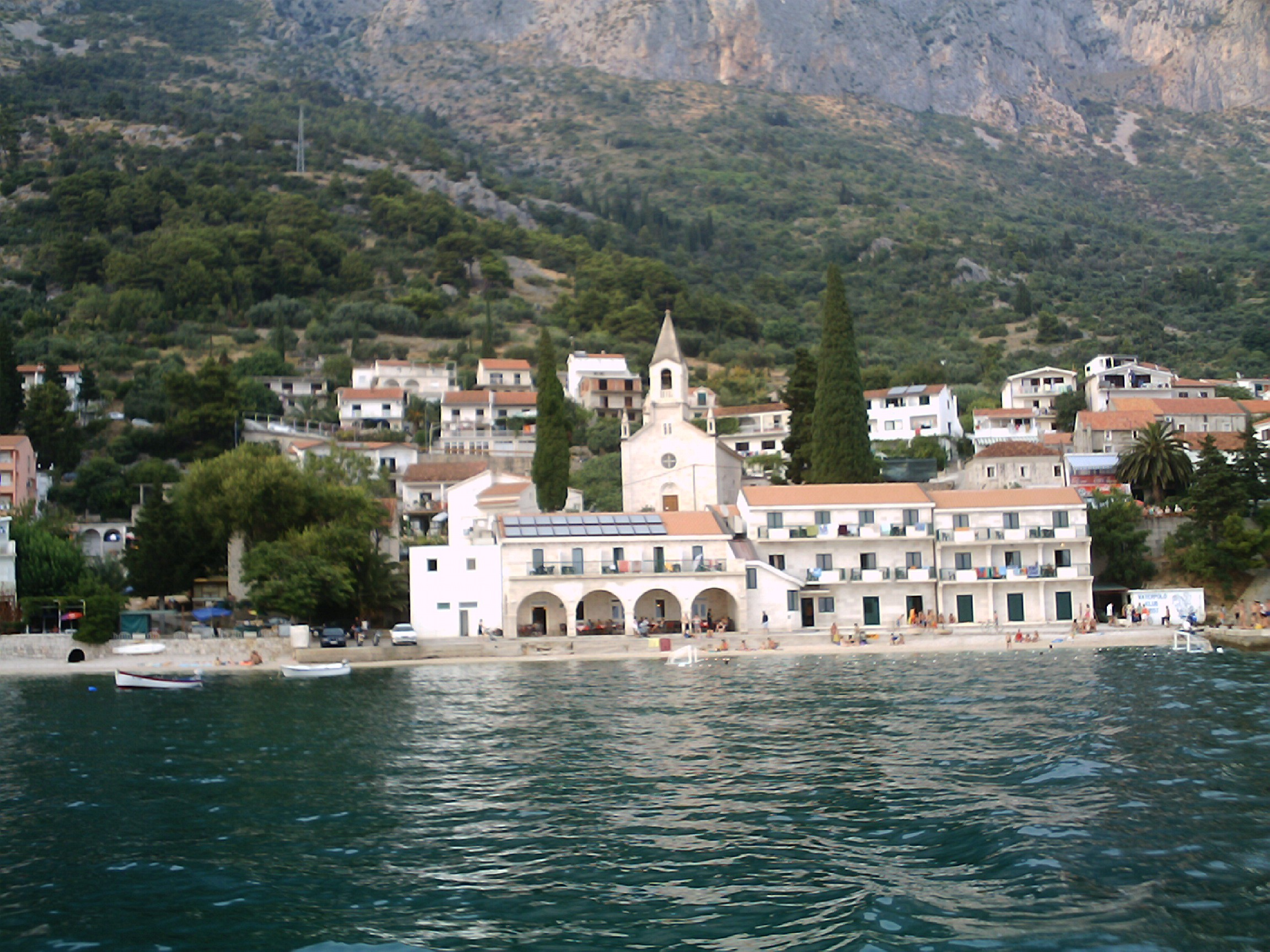
- Seaside view of Brist with Hotel Riva and the Church of St. Margaret the Martyr, patron saint

- Location within Croatia
- Coordinates: 43°07′16″N 17°19′17″E
- Country: Croatia
- County: Split-Dalmatia
- Municipality: Gradac

Area
  - Total: 9.8 km^{2} (3.8 sq mi)

Population (2021)
  - Total: 351
  - Density: 36/km^{2} (93/sq mi)
- Time zone: UTC+1 (CET)
  - Summer (DST): UTC+2 (CEST)

Brist is a village in southern Dalmatia, Croatia, population 400 (census 2011). Located on the Adriatic coast between Makarska and Ploče, with a tradition of fishing, and wine and olive growing, the village is oriented towards tourism in recent decades.

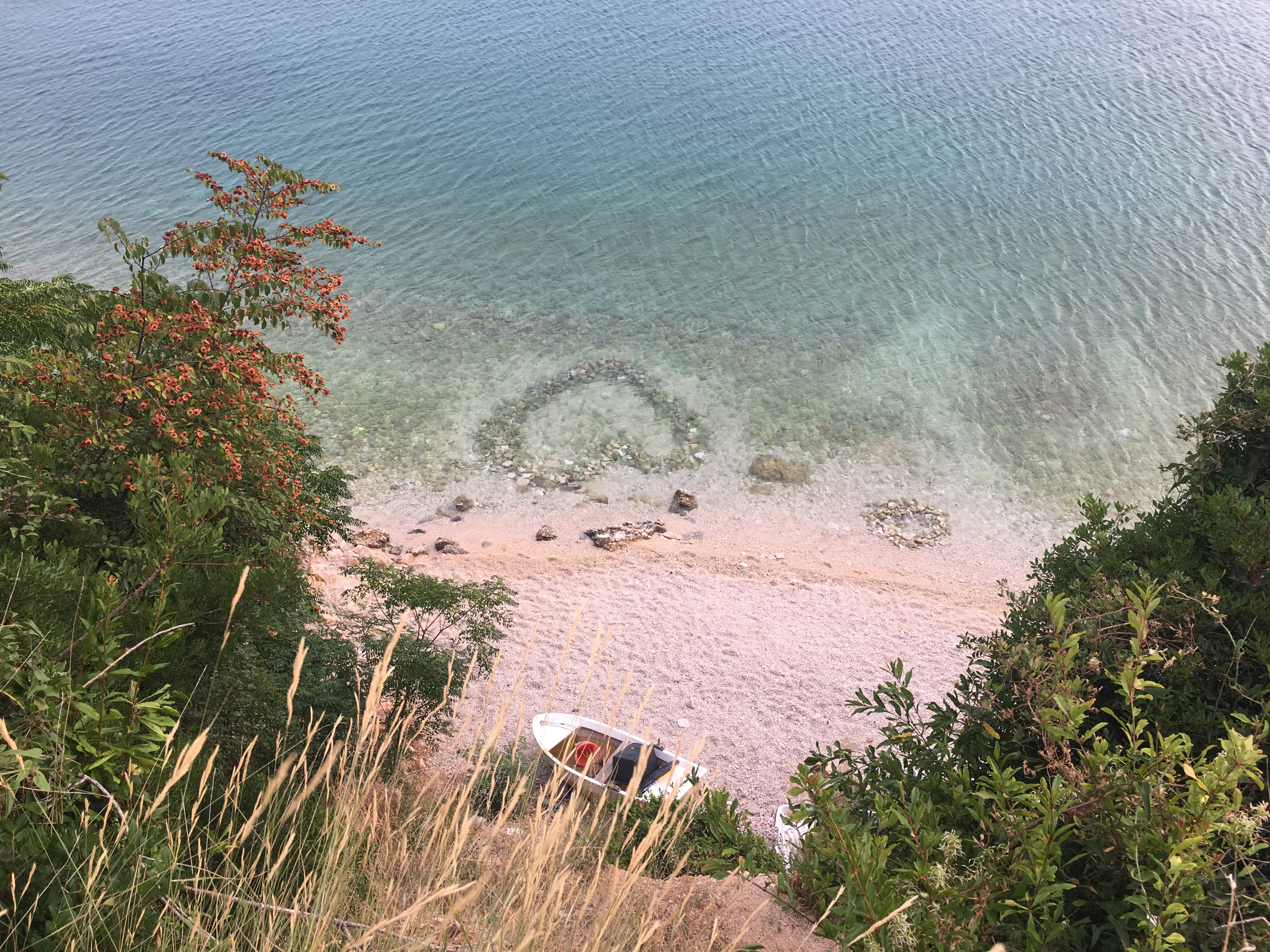
Beach in Brist in 2022

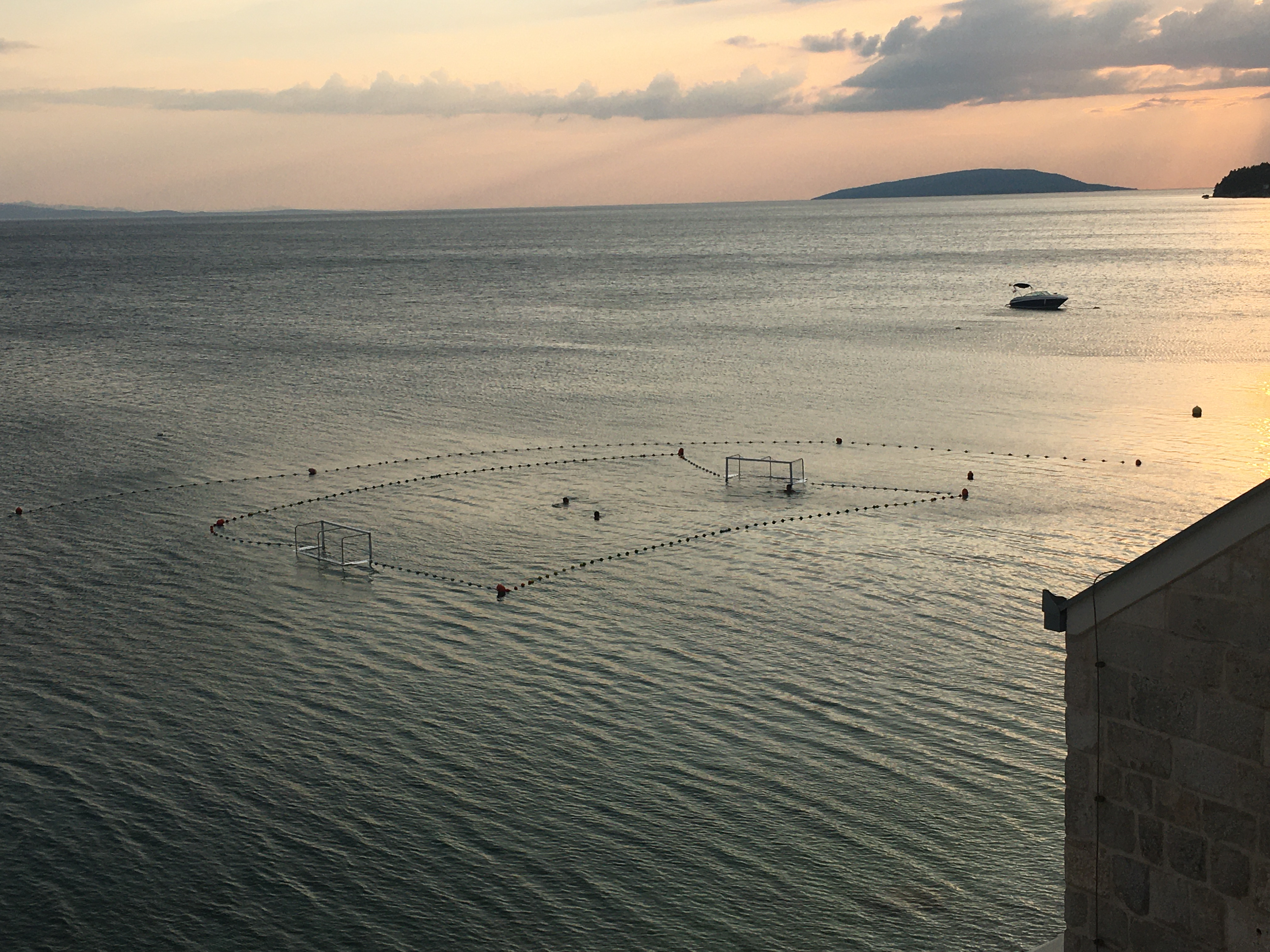
Water polo markings in the sea, Brist 2022
