= Etherley railway station =

Disused railway station in Witton Park, County Durham

Etherley
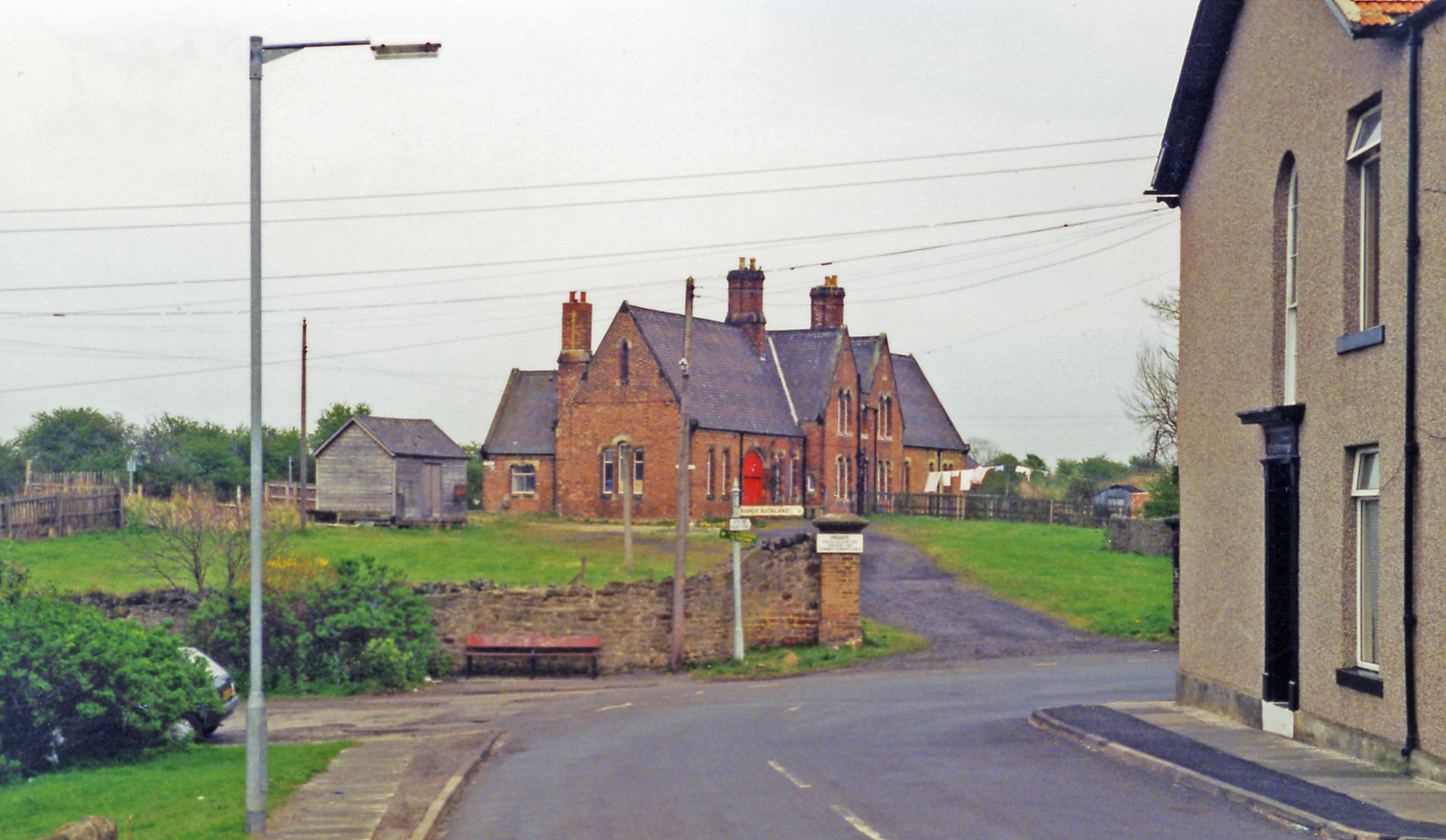
- The site of the station in 1995

General information
- Location: Witton Park, County Durham; England
- Coordinates: 54.6673°N 1.73°W
- Grid reference: NZ175302
- Platforms: 1

Other information
- Status: Disused

History
- Original company: Wear Valley Company
- Pre-grouping: North Eastern Railway
- Post-grouping: LNER

Key dates
- 14 April 1847: First station opened as Etherley & Witton Park
- 16 October 1867: Resited
- 1 July 1871: Renamed Etherley
- 8 March 1965: Closed to passengers
- 1 November 1965: Closed to goods
- 25 August 1991: Reopened as Witton Park
- 1992: Closed
Location

Etherley railway station served the village of Witton Park in County Durham, North East England, from 1847 to 1965 on the Wear Valley line. It was briefly reopened during the summers of 1991 and 1992 as Witton Park.

== History ==
The Bishop Auckland and Weardale Railway (BA&WR) passed through the future site of Etherley station upon its opening between Shildon and Crook in November 1843 and was extended to Waskerley by the Weardale Extension Railway (WXR) in 1845. However, the first station to serve the area did not open until Etherley & Witton Park was opened by the Wear Valley Company on 14 April 1847, shortly before the opening their line between the (BA&WR) at Wear Valley Junction and Frosterley on 3 August 1847. Originally it was only open on market days and only appeared in timetables from September 1847. The Weardale Extension Railway had linked with the Derwent Railway at Waskerley when it first opened but the use of inclines in the area meant that it was not until 1859 (when a deviation was opened to bypass Nanny Mayors Incline) that trains from Etherley station were able to run through to Consett. In 1862, the line to Frosterley was extended to Stanhope by the Frosterley & Stanhope Railway. The station was resited on 16 October 1867 and it was proposed that the original station be converted to cottages. The name was shortened to Etherley on 1 July 1871. On 21 October 1895, the final extension to the Wear Valley Line was opened by the North Eastern Railway between Stanhope and Wearhead.

Much of the route of the WXR served a very sparsely populated area and increased competition from road transport led the then owner, the London & North Eastern Railway (LNER), to close the route north of Tow Law to passengers on 1 May 1939. After the LNER was nationalised to form part of British Railways (BR), traffic on the lines through Etherley continued to decline and so the Wearhead branch was closed to passengers on 29 June 1953 and passenger services on the former WXR line was curtailed at Crook on 11 June 1956. The station did, however, remain open as a stop on the remaining section of the WXR until this too was closed to passengers on 8 March 1965. The Wearhead branch retained its goods service until 1961 when it was cut back to St John's Chapel before being further reduced to terminate at the Cement Work just to the west of Eastgate in 1968. The station itself was closed to goods traffic on 1 November 1965.

Though the tracks were lifted on the Crook line by early 1968, the curtailed Wear Valley Line remained open to provide rail access to the Blue Circle cement works (later owned by Lafarge) and in 1988 BR introduced a summer Sunday extension to the regular Darlington to Bishop Auckland 'Heritage Line' service to Stanhope. As this passed through the site of Etherley station, a campaign was started by the local residents to reopen the station. As a result of this campaign, the station was briefly reopened during the summer of 1991 as a stop on the extended 'Heritage Line' service. However, the service was withdrawn after the summer of 1992 and on 17 March 1993, the freight service to cement works (the last remaining traffic on the line) was withdrawn as it was decided to switch to road haulage.

The track was, however, mothballed and a campaign began in 1993 to preserve the line as a heritage railway. Weardale Railways Limited purchased the line in 2004 and reopened it between Wolsingham and Stanhope in July 2004. However the organisation struggled financially and the service was suspended a short time later, not recommencing until August 2006. After major efforts to clear the line of vegetation and repair damaged tracks, passenger services along the section between Stanhope and Bishop Auckland through Etherley were reintroduced 23 May 2010 and continued until the end of the 2012 season. Over this period, trains ran non-stop between Wolsingham and Bishop Auckland though it was suggested that Etherely could be reopened in the future.

Since 2014, the Railway Trust has operated passenger trains on selected weekdays and weekends for mostly tourist traffic using a class 122 "Bubble Car". Initially, this only ran between Wolsingham and Stanhope but, on 27 March 2016, this service was extended to Witton-le-Wear. In April 2018, the Weardale Railway CIC announced that works had commenced to lift a short section of track at Broken Banks (approximately 1/2 mile west of Bishop Auckland station) to enable the embankment to be repaired after subsidence had made the line unusable for passenger traffic. Once the works are complete it is intended to reinstate the tracks and extend the Stanhope to Witton-le-Wear passenger service back to Bishop Auckland West station. This extension makes the prospect of reopening Etherley station more feasible.

Preceding station	Historical railways	Following station
Bishop Auckland; Line and station open	North Eastern Railway; Wear Valley Line	Wear Valley Junction; Line open, station closed
Bishop Auckland; Line and station open	North Eastern Railway; Weardale Extension Railway	Wear Valley Junction; Line open, station closed
Bishop Auckland; Line and station open	Regional Railways; Heritage Line; Summer Sundays only	Stanhope; Line and station open
