= Harperley railway station =

Disused railway station in Fir Tree, County Durham

Harperley
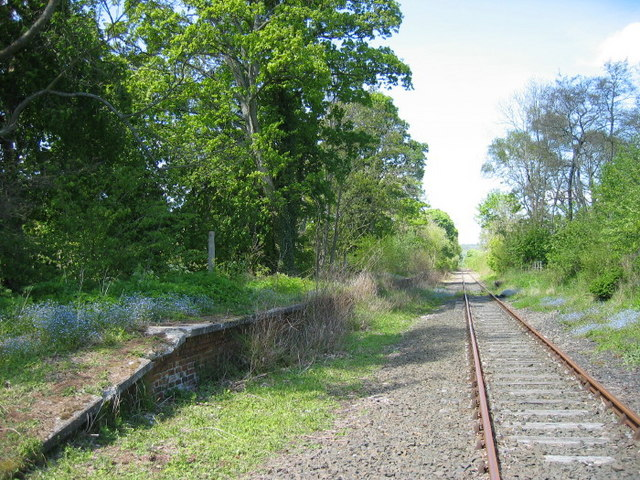
- The site of the station in 2009

General information
- Location: Fir Tree, County Durham; England
- Coordinates: 54.7081°N 1.8208°W
- Grid reference: NZ116348
- Platforms: 2

Other information
- Status: Disused

History
- Original company: Bishop Auckland and Weardale Railway
- Pre-grouping: North Eastern Railway
- Post-grouping: LNER; British Railways (North Eastern)

Key dates
- March 1861: Opened
- May 1864: Closed
- 1 November 1892: Enlarged station reopened
- 29 June 1953: Closed to passengers
- 1 October 1955: Closed completely
Location

Harperley railway station served the Harperley Hall Estate and the nearby hamlet of Low Harperley, close to the village of Fir Tree in County Durham, North East England between 1861 and 1864 and again from 1892 to 1953 as a stop on the Wear Valley Line.

== History ==
The Wear Valley Railway Company opened their line from the Bishop Auckland and Weardale Railway at Witton Junction to Frosterley on 3 August 1847 but initially, no station was provided in this rural location. In March 1861, the Frosterly and Stanhope Railway opened a small halt to serve Harperley Hall and its estate as part of works to extended the Wear Valley Line from Frosterley to Stanhope, a project that was completed the following year. However, because the station was built primarily to serve the Hall, it was located at the end of a private estate road with little public access and thus was closed in May 1864. A new, enlarged station, with sidings on either side of the tracks, was opened by the North Eastern Railway (NER) at Harperley on 1 November 1892 to serve a local ganister and timber contractor. On 21 October 1895, the NER extended the Stanhope line to Wearhead.

The line was double track through Harperley (to enable trains to pass) and this was controlled from a signal box, adjacent to the level crossing carrying the estate road across the line.

During WWII, a prisoner of war camp was constructed nearby, perhaps as a result of the remote location with good rail links.

The station was closed to passengers by British Railways (BR) on 29 June 1953 and goods on 1O October 1955, though goods traffic continued to pass through the station for some years. In 1961 the line was cut back to St John's Chapel and then, in 1968, it was further reduced to the Blue Circle Cement Works (later owned by Lafarge), just to the west of Eastgate. Though stopping goods trains had been withdrawn completely, the line was retained to serve the cement works and, in 1988, BR introduced a summer Sunday extension to the regular Darlington to Bishop Auckland 'Heritage Line' service to Stanhope though no stop was provided at Harperley and the service was withdrawn after the summer of 1992 along with the freight on 17 March 1993.

Rather than close the line when freight traffic was withdrawn, BR mothballed it and a campaign began in 1993 to preserve the line as a heritage railway. Weardale Railways Limited purchased the line in 2004 and reopened it between Wolsingham and Stanhope in July 2004. However the organisation struggled financially and the service was suspended a short time later, not recommencing until August 2006.

After major efforts to clear the line of vegetation and repair damaged tracks, passenger services along the section between Stanhope and Bishop Auckland West through (but not stopping at) Harperley were reintroduced on 23 May 2010 and continued until the end of the 2012 season. However, in June 2014 a limited, volunteer-run passenger service was reintroduced between Stanhope and Wolsingham using a class 122 "Bubble Car" and on 27 March 2016 this service was extended to Witton-le-Wear. However this service does not stop at Harperley and there do not currently appear to be any plans to reopen the station.

Preceding station	Historical railways	Following station
Wolsingham; Line open, station open	North Eastern Railway; Frosterly and Stanhope Railway	Witton-le-Wear; Line open, station open

Preceding station	Historical railways	Following station
Witton-le-Wear; Line and station open	North Eastern Railway; Wear Valley Line	Wolsingham; Line and station open
