= Wear Valley Junction railway station =

Former station in County Durham, England

Wear Valley Junction

General information
- Location: High Grange, County Durham; England
- Coordinates: 54.681°N 1.7435°W
- Grid reference: NZ166318
- Platforms: 2

Other information
- Status: Disused

History
- Original company: Bishop Auckland and Weardale Railway
- Pre-grouping: North Eastern Railway
- Post-grouping: LNER

Key dates
- July 1844: Opening of Bishop Auckland & Weardale Railway; first unofficial use of the station
- 3 April 1847: Opened as Junction
- ?: Renamed Witton Junction
- May 1872: Renamed Wear Valley Junction
- 8 July 1935: Closed
Location

Wear Valley Junction railway station primarily served as an interchange between the Wear Valley Line and the Weardale Extension Railway (WXR) between 1847 and 1935. It was the closest railway station to the village of High Grange in County Durham, North East England.

== History ==
The Bishop Auckland & Weardale Railway (BA&WR) passed through the future site of the station upon its opening between Shildon and Crook in November 1843 and was extended to Waskerley by the WXR in 1845. However the rural nature of the station's future location meant that it is unlikely that a station was provided initially and it is unknown exactly when passengers began to board and alight from trains at the site: minutes from the Bishop Auckland & Weardale Railway Company suggest that it was considering installing a shelter at 'the Valley Junction' for passengers from Witton-le-Wear and other surrounding settlements on 17 October 1845. It is likely that the station opened when the Wear Valley Company's line from the station to Frosterley on 3 April 1847 and first appeared in the BA&WR timetable in the September of that year as Junction.

The WXR had linked with the Derwent Railway at Waskerley when it first opened but the use of inclines in the area meant that it was not until 1859 (when a deviation was opened to bypass Nanny Mayors Incline) that trains from Wear Valley Junction station were able to run through to Consett. In 1862, the line to Frosterley was extended to Stanhope by the Frosterley & Stanhope Railway and was once again extended on 21 October 1895 by the North Eastern Railway between Stanhope and Wearhead.

The station was situated four hundred yards north of Low Lane. It had an unusual platform layout: the down platform was located south of the junction and could therefore easily serve the branch while to use the up platform, a train for the branch had to cross the junction before reversing into the station due that platform being located north of the junction. Both platforms were linked by a subway. There was also a crescent-shaped turntable with 9 servicing roads, adjacent to the station which was built in 1876 and served nearby mineral trains and sidings. Access between these were controlled by the signal box, which was situated at the junction.

The station was closed to both passengers and goods traffic on 8 July 1935 though passenger and goods train continued to pass through on both lines for many years: the London & North Eastern Railway (LNER) closed the former WXR route north of Tow Law to passengers on 1 May 1939. After the LNER was nationalised to become part of British Railways (BR), the remaining lines began to lose passenger services: the Wearhead branch closed to passengers on 29 June 1953 and the former WXR route was cut back to Crook 11 June 1956 before losing all passenger services on 8 March 1965. The Wearhead branch did retain its goods service until 1961 when it was cut back, first to St John's Chapel and then, in 1968, to the Blue Circle Cement Works (later owned by Lafarge) just to the west of Eastgate. The tracks were lifted on the Crook line by early 1968 but the curtailed Wear Valley Line remained open and, in 1988 BR introduced a summer Sunday extension to the regular Darlington to Bishop Auckland 'Heritage Line' service to Stanhope though no stop was provided at Wear Valley Junction and this service was withdrawn after the summer of 1992 along with the freight on 17 March 1993.

The track was, however, mothballed and a campaign began in 1993 to preserve the line as a heritage railway. Weardale Railways Limited purchased the line in 2004 and reopened it between Wolsingham and Stanhope in July 2004. However the organisation struggled financially and the service was suspended a short time later, not recommencing until August 2006. After major efforts to clear the line of vegetation and repair damaged tracks, passenger services along the section between Stanhope and Bishop Auckland through Wear Valley Junction were reintroduced 23 May 2010 and continued until the end of the 2012 season. Over this period, trains ran non-stop between Wolsingham and Bishop Auckland. Since 2014, the Railway Trust has operated passenger trains on selected weekdays and weekends for mostly tourist traffic using a class 122 "Bubble Car". Initially, this only ran between Wolsingham and Stanhope but, on 27 March 2016, this service was extended to Witton-le-Wear. In April 2018, the Weardale Railway CIC announced that works had commenced to lift a short section of track at Broken Banks (approximately 1/2 mile west of Bishop Auckland) to enable the embankment to be repaired after subsidence had made the line unusable for passenger traffic. Once the works are complete it is intended to reinstate the tracks and extend the Stanhope to Witton-le-Wear passenger service back to Bishop Auckland West station from July 2018 there still do not currently appear to be any plans to reopen Wear Valley Junction.

Preceding station	Historical railways	Following station
Etherley; Line open, station closed	North Eastern Railway; Wear Valley Line	Witton-le-Wear; Line and station open
Etherley; Line open, station closed	North Eastern Railway; Weardale Extension Railway	Beechburn; Line and station closed
