= Eastgate railway station =

Disused railway station in Eastgate, County Durham

Eastgate
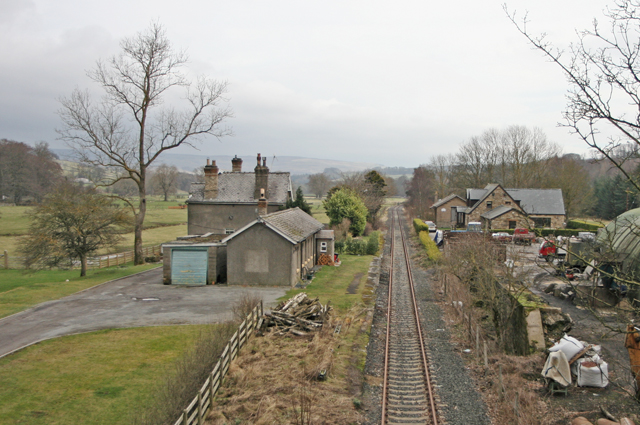
- The site of the station in February 2008

General information
- Location: Eastgate, County Durham; England
- Coordinates: 54.7419°N 2.0695°W
- Grid reference: NY956385
- Platforms: 1

Other information
- Status: Disused

History
- Original company: North Eastern Railway
- Post-grouping: LNER; British Railways (North Eastern)

Key dates
- 21 October 1895: Opened
- 29 June 1953: Closed to passengers
- 14 September 1980: Closed completely
Location

Eastgate railway station, also known as Eastgate-in-Weardale, served the village of Eastgate in County Durham, North East England from 1895 to 1953 as a stop on the Wear Valley Line.

== History ==
Railway development in Weardale was a slow process: the Shildon to Crook route of the Bishop Auckland & Weardale Railway reached as far as Witton Junction (east of Witton-le-Wear) in November 1843. However the Wear Valley Railway was the first line to truly enter the dale when it opened as a branch from Witton Junction to Frosterley and Bishopley on 3 August 1847 and this was then extended to Stanhope by the Frosterley & Stanhope Railway in 1862. However it was not until 21 October 1895 that the railway reached Eastgate when the North Eastern Railway extended the line from Stanhope to Wearhead and opened the station at Eastgate.

The station had a goods shed (which still remains as the only remaining example of one of many similar goods sheds on the Wearhead extension of the line) and a number of sidings however the lack of run-round facilities meant that all shunting had to be carried by a rope attached to the locomotive.

The station was closed to passengers by British Railways on 29 June 1953 when passenger services on the branch west of Wear Valley Junction were withdrawn, though goods traffic continued to serve the station for some years. In 1961 the line was cut back to St John's Chapel and then, in 1968, it was further reduced to the Blue Circle Cement Works (later owned by Lafarge), just to the west of Eastgate station. This had opened in 1964 and utilised purpose built railway container waggons to transport most of the cement that it produced to Teesside, Tyneside and Scotland. On 14 September 1970, Eastgate became a public delivery siding and continued in this role until the withdrawal of the remaining local goods services on 14 September 1980. Cement traffic continued, however, and so the line was retained. Then, in 1988, BR introduced a summer Sunday extension to the regular Darlington to Bishop Auckland 'Heritage Line' service as far as Stanhope and this was continued until the service was withdrawn after the summer of 1992 followed by the remaining cement traffic on 17 March 1993.

Rather than close the line when freight traffic was withdrawn, BR mothballed it and a campaign began in 1993 to preserve the line as a heritage railway. Weardale Railways Limited purchased the line in 2004 and reopened it between Wolsingham and Stanhope in July 2004. However the organisation struggled financially and the service was suspended a short time later, not recommencing until August 2006.

On 29 September 2009, the development of the Eastgate Renewable Energy Village received unanimous outline approval by the County Durham strategic planning committee. This plan would have involved the opening of a new station at Eastgate to serve new development on the site of the cement works (demolished in 2005) but the withdrawal of government funding in 2010 put the plans under threat and by 2013 the project appeared to have stalled.

The Weardale Railway did, however remain active and, after major efforts to clear the line of vegetation and repair damaged tracks, passenger services along the section between Stanhope and Bishop Auckland West were reintroduced on 23 May 2010 and continued until the end of the 2012 season. However, in June 2014 a limited, volunteer-run passenger service was reintroduced between Stanhope and Wolsingham using a class 122 "Bubble Car" and on 27 March 2016 this service was extended to Witton-le-Wear. It is therefore possible that passenger services could return to Eastgate in future.

Disused railways
| Westgate-in-Weardale; Line and station closed | North Eastern Railway; Wear Valley Line | Stanhope; Line closed, station open |
| Preceding station | Heritage railways | Following station |
Proposed extension
| Terminus | Weardale Railway | Stanhope towards Bishop Auckland |
