= Witton-le-Wear railway station =

Disused railway station in Witton-le-Wear, County Durham

Witton-le-Wear
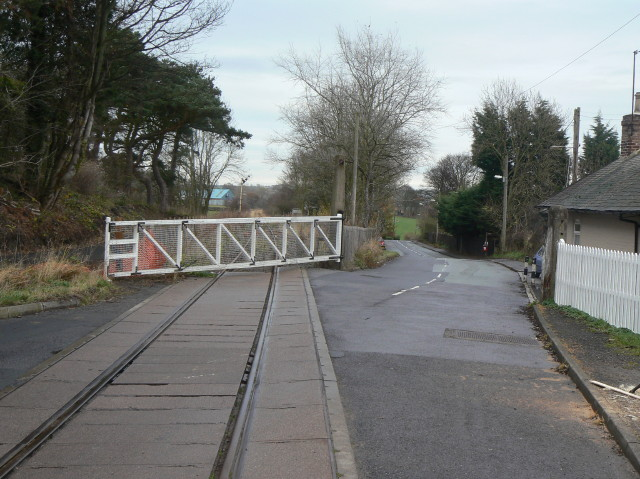
- The site of the station seen looking across Witton-le-Wear level crossing in November 2009. The second station was on the left side of the track and the future site of the current (third) station is located on the right side of the track

General information
- Location: Witton-le-Wear, County Durham; England
- Coordinates: 54.6761°N 1.7684°W
- Grid reference: NZ150312
- System: Station on heritage railway
- Operator: Weardale Railway
- Platforms: 1

History
- Original company: Frosterley & Stanhope Railway
- Pre-grouping: North Eastern Railway
- Post-grouping: London & North Eastern Railway

Key dates
- 3 August 1847: First station opened
- c.1880: First station replaced by second
- 29 June 1953: Second station closed to passengers
- 1 November 1965: Second station closed completely
- 27 March 2016: Third station opened on adjacent site to second
Location

Witton-le-Wear railway station is a railway station on the Weardale heritage railway serves the village of Witton-le-Wear in County Durham, North East England, and is the penultimate stop for most of line's eastbound passenger services (though one return service from Stanhope train per day currently terminates here rather than continuing to the eastern terminus at Bishop Auckland West). The current station platform is located on the opposite side of the track to the original railway station which was operation between 1847 and 1953.

== History ==
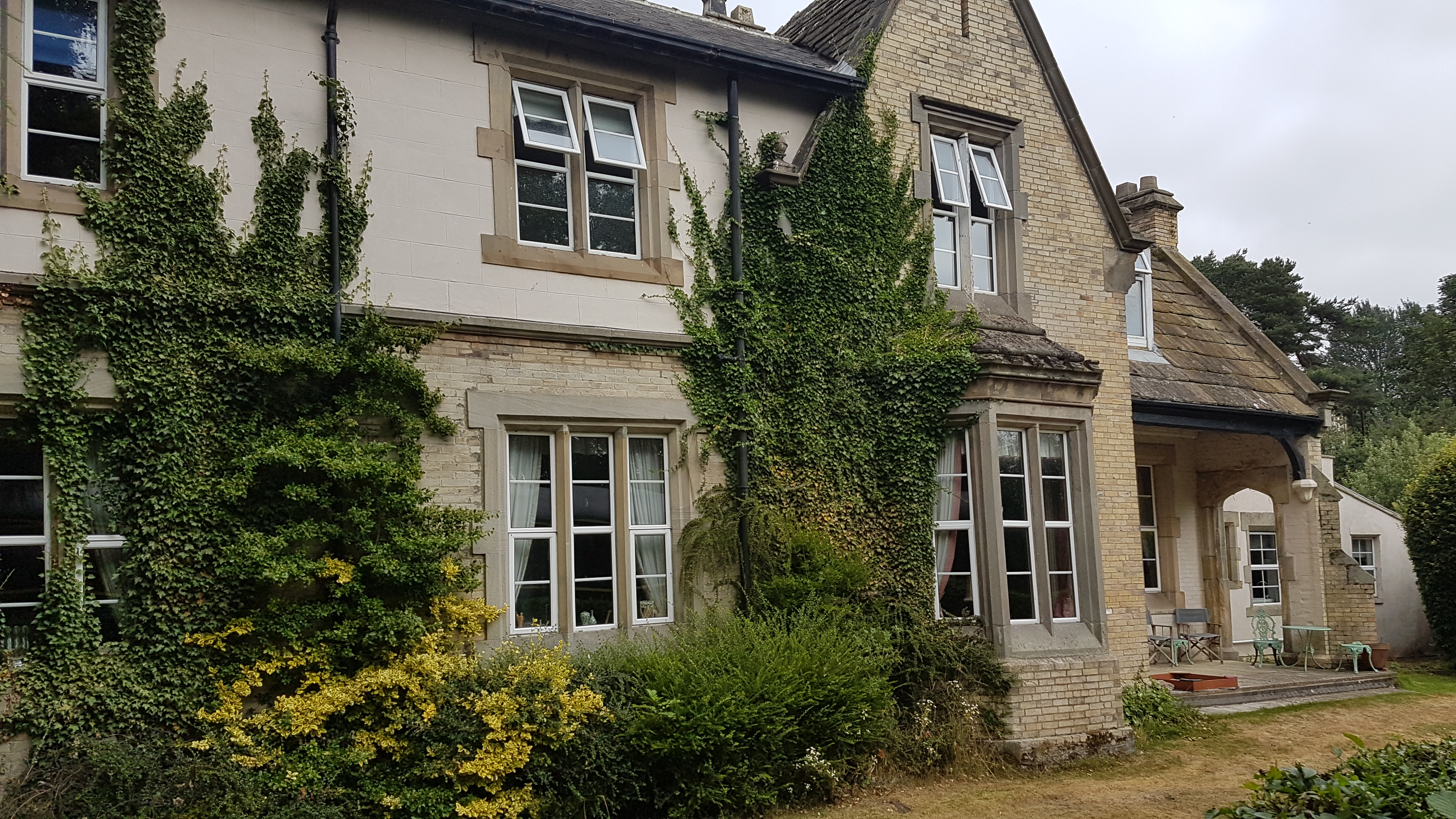
The remaining buildings from the first Witton-le-Wear station, now a private house.

The first station opened on 3 April 1847 by the Wear Valley Company on their line from the Bishop Auckland & Weardale Railway at Witton Junction to Frosterley and was located close to the A68. This line was extended to Stanhope in 1862 by the Frosterley & Stanhope Railway. It was found that this station's location on a curved and steeply graded section of the line made it difficult to start passenger trains from it and thus, in the 1880s, the North Eastern Railway constructed a new station 20 chains to the east, on the east side of Witton-le-Wear level crossing. On 21 October 1895, the Stanhope line was extended once again to reach Wearhead.

Opposite the second station was a single road goods shed and a coal drop while on the west side of the level crossing was another siding serving a horse and cattle dock. The station was closed to passengers on 27 June 1953 and to goods traffic on 1 November 1965.

The station was closed to passengers by British Railways (BR) on 29 June 1953 and goods on 1 November 1965. In 1961 the line was cut back to St John's Chapel and then, in 1968, it was further reduced to the Blue Circle Cement Works (later owned by Lafarge), just to the west of Eastgate. Though stopping goods trains had been withdrawn, the line was retained to serve the cement works ad, in 1988 BR introduced a summer Sunday extension to the regular Darlington to Bishop Auckland 'Heritage Line' service to Stanhope though no stop was provided at Witton-le-Wear (the second station had been demolished in April 1973) and the service was subsequently withdrawn after the summer of 1992. The remaining freight was withdrawn on 17 March 1993.

== Weardale Railway ==
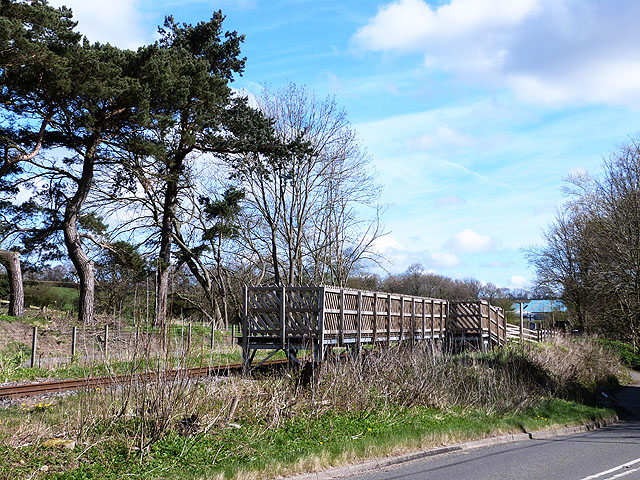
The new station at Witton-le-Wear in April 2014. At this time the station had been disused for 2 years and would not see its first train until 2016

Rather than close the line when freight traffic was withdrawn, the line was mothballed and a campaign began in 1993 to preserve the line as a heritage railway. Weardale Railways Limited purchased the line in 2004 and reopened it between Wolsingham and Stanhope in July 2004. However the organisation struggled financially and the service was suspended a short time later, not recommencing until August 2006.

After major efforts to clear the line of vegetation and repair damaged tracks, passenger services along the section between Stanhope and Bishop Auckland through Witton-le-Wear were reintroduced 23 May 2010. In early August 2012, the Weardale Railway announced that a new £25,000 station was under construction (using elements from the first temporary platform at Bishop Auckland West station) as a result of a joint initiative with Witton-le-Wear Parish Council, the Witton Castle Country Park and Durham County Council. However, by the time the station was ready for use, the 2012 season had ended and, in 2013, it was announced that regular passenger services had been discontinued.

In June 2014 a limited, volunteer-run passenger service was reintroduced between Stanhope and Wolsingham using a class 122 "Bubble Car" and on 27 March 2016 this service was extended to Witton-le-Wear, nearly four years after the station had been constructed. In April 2018, the Weardale Railway CIC announced that works had commenced to lift a short section of track at Broken Banks (approximately 1/2 mile west of Bishop Auckland station) to enable the embankment to be repaired after subsidence had made the line unusable for passenger traffic. Once the works are complete it is intended to reinstate the tracks and extend the Stanhope to Witton-le-Wear passenger service back to Bishop Auckland West station. Since July 2018, two of the three daily return services between Stanhope and Witton-le-Wear have continued to Bishop Auckland West station.

Preceding station	Heritage railways	Following station
Wolsingham towards Stanhope	Weardale Railway	Bishop Auckland Terminus
Historical railways
Harperley; Line open, station closed	North Eastern Railway; Wear Valley Line	Wear Valley Junction; Line open, station closed
