= High Stoop railway station =

Railway station in County Durham, England

High Stoop/High Souk

General information
- Location: High Stoop, County Durham; England
- Coordinates: 54.75588°N 1.84147°W
- Platforms: 1

Other information
- Status: Disused

History
- Original company: Stockton & Darlington Railway
- Pre-grouping: North Eastern Railway
- Post-grouping: North Eastern Railway

Key dates
- 1851: Station opened
- 1881: Station closed to passengers
- May 1939: Line closed to passengers
- 1951: Line between Burnhill and Blackhill closed
- 1956: Line between Burnhill and Tow Law closed
Location

High Stoop railway station also known as High Souk was a railway station that served the village of High Stoop, County Durham, England. It was located on the Bishop Auckland and Weardale Railway line from Bishop Auckland to Blackhill between Wear Valley Junction and Tow Law.

== History ==
The station was opened by the Stockton & Darlington Railway in 1851 on their line between Bishop Auckland and Blackhill. It was located in a rural area of Weardale. The station closed to passengers in 1881 before closing to all traffic between Tow Law and Blackhill. The disused railway line was later in use between Saltersgate Cottage and Burnhill for the Salters Gate Ammunition Depot opened by military traffic to access the transfer yard in both directions between Saltersgate Cottage and Burnhill via Burnhill Junction until 1956 when the line was closed. The trackbed and original cottages near the station are now in private ownership.

Preceding station	Historical railways	Following station
Saltersgate Cottage; Line and station closed	North Eastern Railway; Weardale Extension Railway (Consett Branch) & (Stanhope Branch)	Tow Law; Line and station closed
