= Beechburn railway station =

Disused railway station in Low Beechburn, County Durham

Beechburn
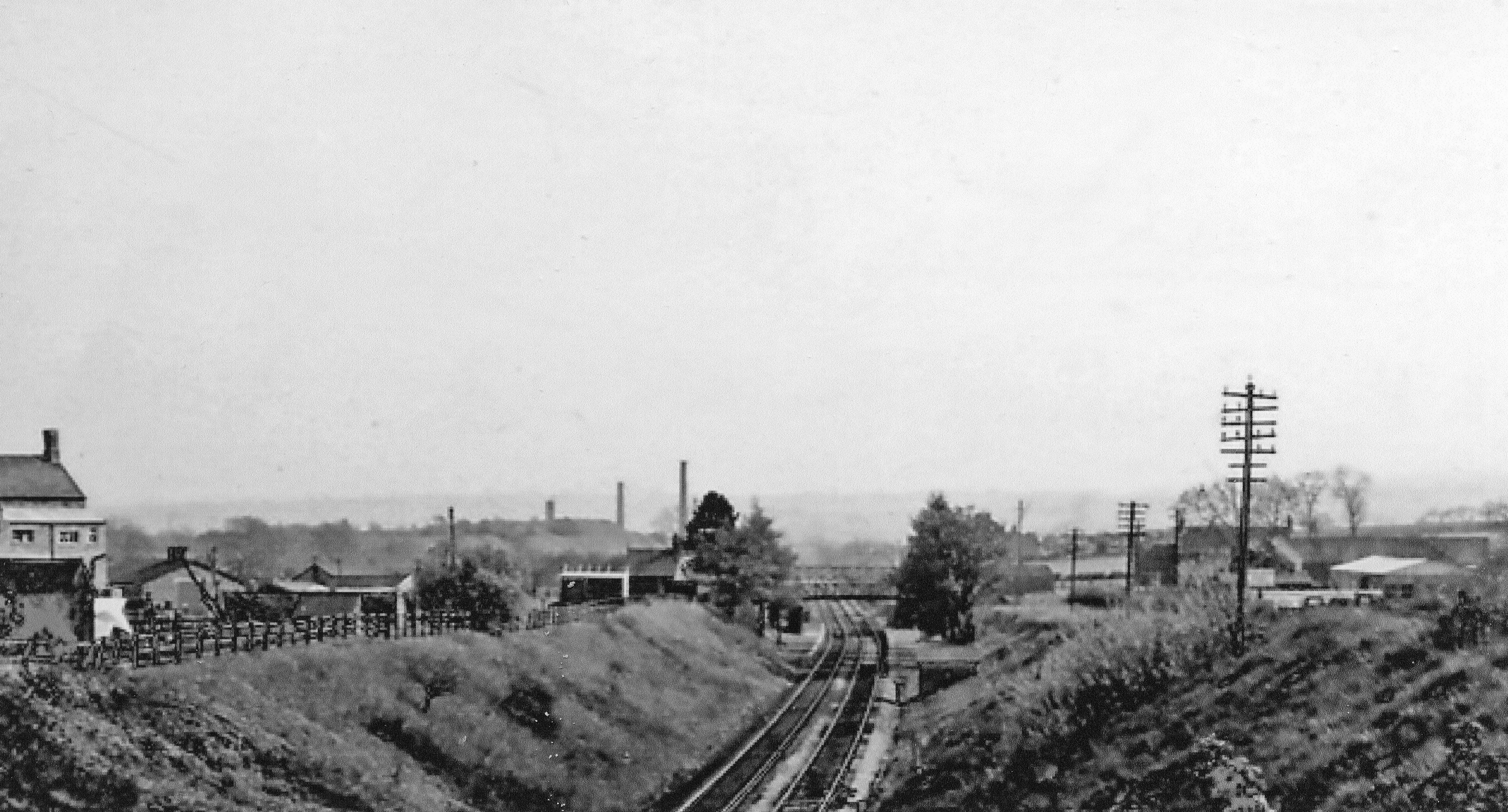
- The station in 1965

General information
- Location: Low Beechburn, County Durham; England
- Coordinates: 54.6931°N 1.7486°W
- Grid reference: NZ163331
- Platforms: 2

Other information
- Status: Disused

History
- Original company: Bishop Auckland and Weardale Railway
- Pre-grouping: North Eastern Railway
- Post-grouping: London and North Eastern Railway; British Rail (North Eastern Region)

Key dates
- February 1845: Opened
- 8 March 1965: Closed
Location

Beechburn railway station served the hamlet of Low Beechburn, County Durham, England, from 1845 to 1965 on the Stanhope and Tyne Railway.

== History ==
The station opened in February 1845 by the Bishop Auckland and Weardale Railway. It was situated at the end of Station Road and to the east of Railway Street. To the north was Beechburn Colliery. It was confused with Howden in a lot of early timetables and records. It closed on 8 March 1965.

| Preceding station | Historical railways | Following station |
|---|---|---|
| Crook; Line and station closed | Stanhope and Tyne Railway | Wear Valley Junction; Line and station closed |
