= Westgate, County Durham =

Village in England

Coordinates: 54°44′N 2°08′W

Westgate
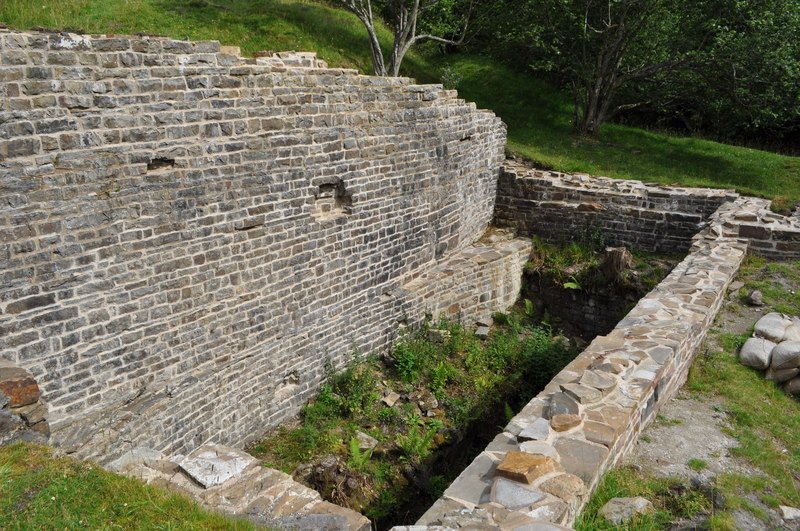
- The preserved mine (wheel pit) north of Westgate on the Slitt vein

- Location within County Durham
- Population: 298 (2011 census)
- Civil parish: Stanhope
- Unitary authority: County Durham
- Ceremonial county: County Durham
- Region: North East
- Country: England
- Sovereign state: United Kingdom

Westgate is a village in the civil parish of Stanhope, in County Durham, England. It is situated in Weardale between St John's Chapel and Eastgate on the A689 cross-country road. In the 2001 census Westgate had a population of 298. Westgate is also the entrance to Slitt wood and an old abandoned lead mine. Other features of the village include a caravan site and a football and basketball court.

Westgate Castle was a peel tower-cum-hunting lodge, probably built in the 14th century, and forming the western gatehouse (hence the name) of Stanhope Deer Park owned by the Bishop of Durham. In 1442 the building was granted to Lord Lumley and used for forest courts and administration, but later served as a residence. By 1647 the 'castle' had become ruinous and was 'now demolished' although the 'crumbling walls of an old castle at Westgate' are mentioned in 1791. In 1540, John Leland described the Bishop of Durham's deer park in Weardale as 'rudely enclosed with stone of a 12 or 14 miles in compass near Westgate and Eastgate'.

There is a Primitive Methodist chapel built 1871 and incorporating an earlier chapel built in 1824.

The Anglican parish church of St Andrew was built in 1864 by Robert Jewell Withers (1824–1894).

== Weardale Railway ==
The village was once served by a railway station on the Weardale Railway that ran up the valley to Wearhead. The line has been preserved and runs between Bishop Auckland and nearby Eastgate-In-Weardale; the former Westgate station is closed and under different use.

== Attractions ==
Middlehope Burn stream runs from Middlehope Shaft in the hills above Allenheads and joins the River Wear at Westgate. A public footpath (walking trail) follows the stream for its first mile and a half (2.4 km) through Slit Woods.

There are numerous small waterfalls and a couple of larger ones on this stretch of stream. The largest is Slit Force. Some lead mining ruins sit at the top end of Slit Woods.

500m / yards east of Westgate village on the River Wear sits a low waterfall, Westgate Force.

A road drops off the A689 at the west end of the village, crossing the river via a ford. The road eventually reaches Newbiggin in Teesdale.

== Sources ==
- Smailes, AE (1960). North England. Edinburgh: Thomas Nelson & Sons Ltd.
