= Bishop Auckland West railway station =

Heritage railway station in County Durham, England

Bishop Auckland West
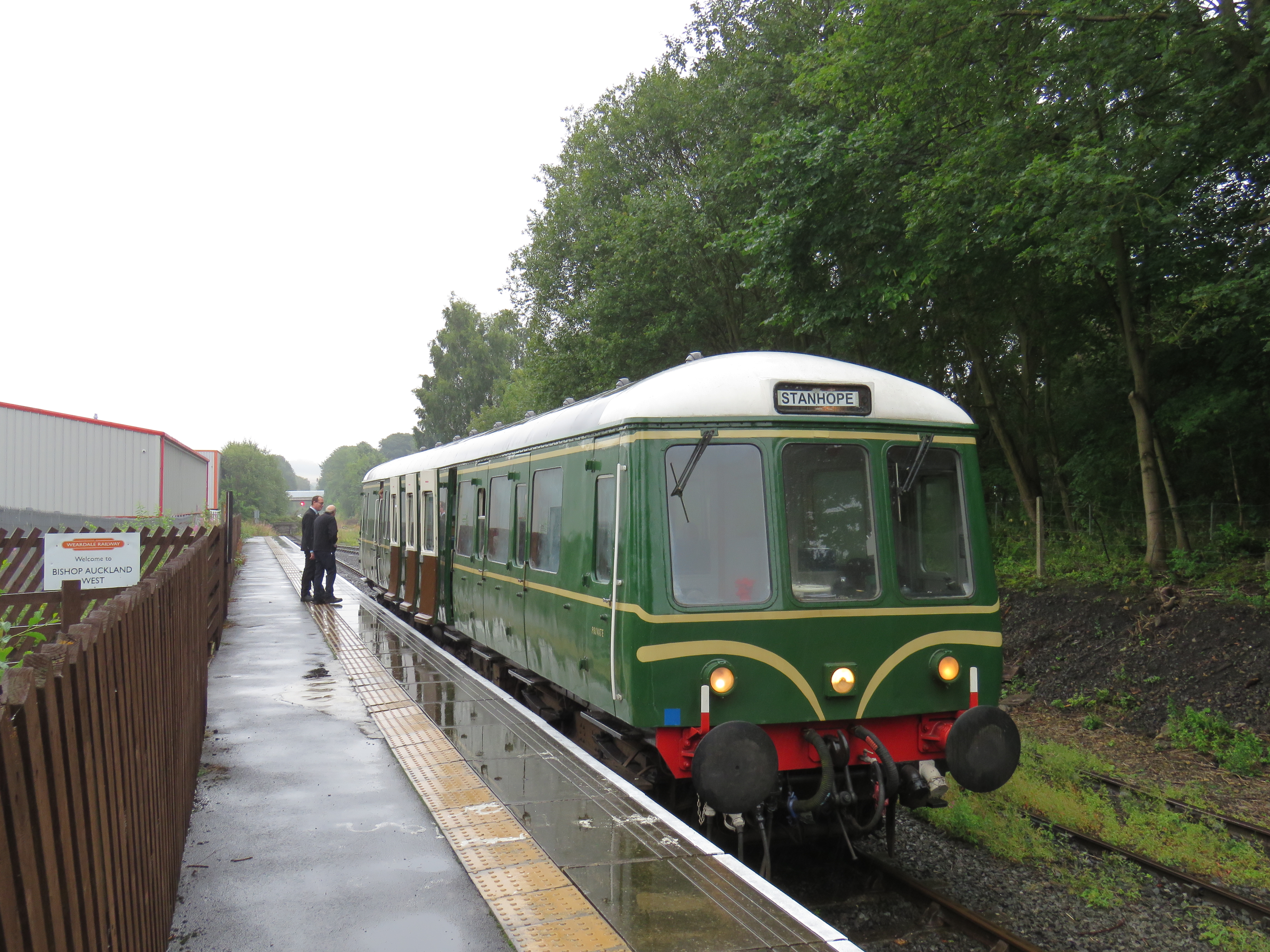

General information
- Location: Bishop Auckland, County Durham, England
- Coordinates: 54°39′26″N 1°40′53″W
- Grid reference: NZ208291
- System: Station on heritage railway
- Owner: Weardale Railway
- Manager: Weardale Railway
- Platforms: 1
- Tracks: 2

History
- Original company: Weardale Railway

Key dates
- May 2010: Opened
- 2012: Service suspended
- July 2018: Service resumed
Location
- Location within County Durham

Bishop Auckland West is the eastern terminus of the Weardale Railway, a heritage railway which runs between there and Stanhope. The station was built by the Weardale Railway and initially opened on 23 May 2010, with a regular passenger service which lasted until the end of the 2012 running season.

Regular heritage trains were reintroduced in 2014, mainly using a Class 122 Bubble Car, initially only running between Wolsingham and Stanhope, but later extended to Witton-le-Wear on 27 March 2016.

After a short section of track at Broken Banks (Note: Broken Banks lies approximately 1/2 mile (0.80 km) west of Bishop Auckland.) was lifted and the underlying embankment repaired in early 2018, the line through to Bishop Auckland was made safe for passenger traffic for the first time in a number of years. Thus, from July 2018, two of the three daily return services between Stanhope and Witton-le-Wear have been extended to Bishop Auckland West.

The station is located approximately 150 metres (160 yd) to the west of the National Rail station. A footpath linking the two stations was completed in August 2022.

Preceding station	Heritage railways	Following station
Witton-le-Wear towards Stanhope	Weardale Railway	Terminus
