= Westgate station =

Westgate station can refer to:

- Westgate station (Las Vegas Monorail) in Nevada, United States
- Westgate station (Metro Transit) in Minnesota, United States
- Westgate-on-Sea railway station in Kent, England
- Wakefield Westgate railway station in West Yorkshire, England
- Rotherham Westgate railway station, a former station in South Yorkshire, England
- Westgate station, Johannesburg in Ferreirasdorp, South Africa
- Westgate-in-Weardale railway station, a planned station on the Weardale Railway in England
