= Wolsingham railway station =

Heritage railway station in County Durham, England

Wolsingham
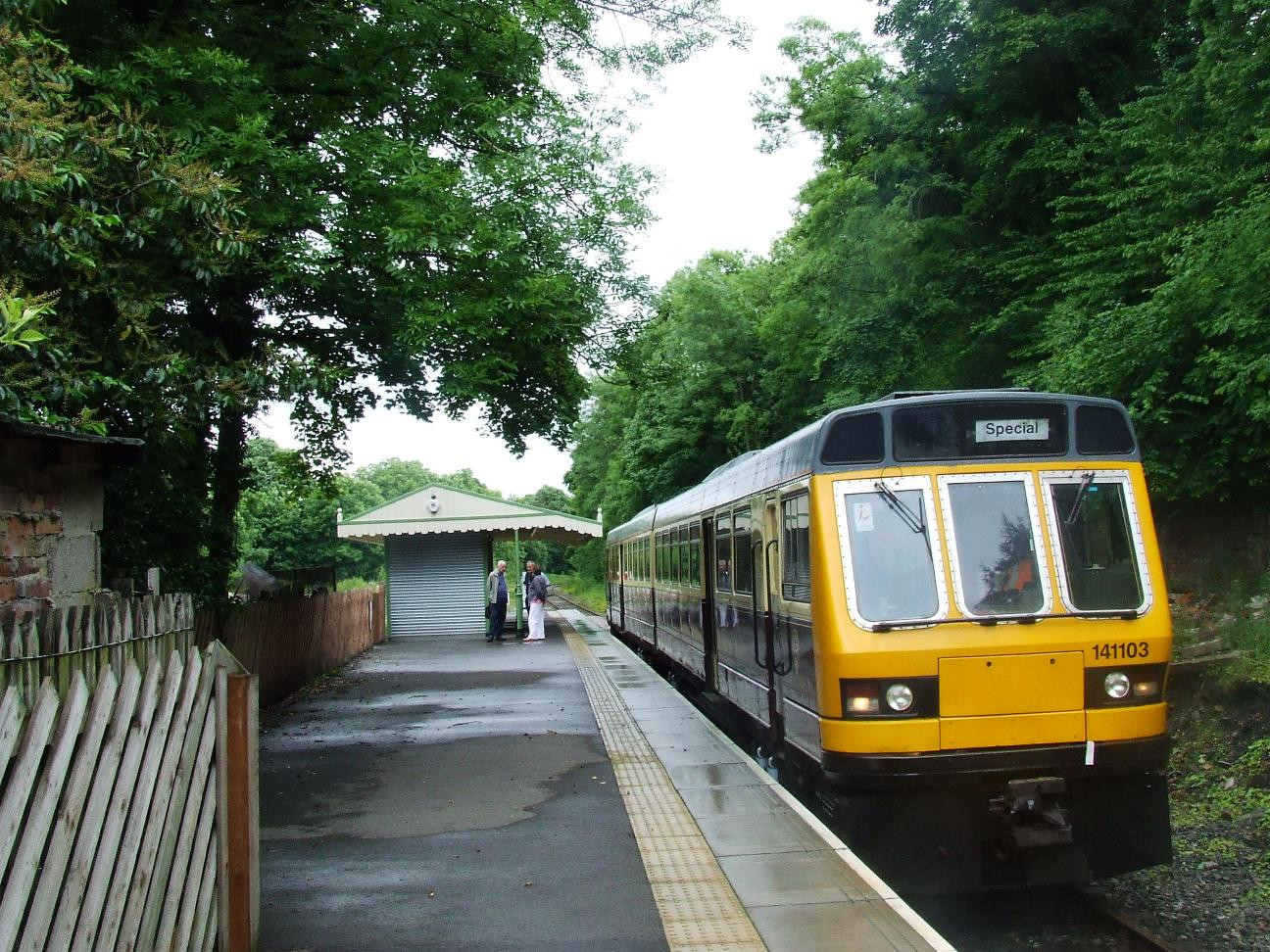

General information
- Location: Wolsingham, County Durham, England
- System: Station on heritage railway
- Manager: Weardale Railway

History
- Original company: Frosterly and Stanhope Railway
- Pre-grouping: North Eastern Railway
- Post-grouping: London and North Eastern Railway

Key dates
- 1847: Opened
- 1953: Closed to passengers
- 1965: Closed completely
- 2004: Reopened on the Weardale Railway
Location

Wolsingham is a railway station on the heritage Weardale Railway; it serves the town of Wolsingham, in Weardale, County Durham, England. Services operate on selected days throughout the year, largely at weekends. The station is situated 10.5 miles (16.9 km) from the terminus of the line at Bishop Auckland West. The railway's main shed is based nearby at Wolsingham depot, as is the line's only passing loop, Scotch Isle.

== History ==
=== British railway network (1847-1993) ===
The station opened on 3 August 1847, on the Wear Valley Railway, which at that point terminated at Frosterley. The railway was subsequently extended to Stanhope in 1862 and then to Wearhead in 1895. The line closed completely to passengers in 1953, although the line and station remained open for goods until 1965. The line remained open for traffic to and from Eastgate cement works until 1993.

The station originally was built with two platforms linked by a footbridge, with a signal box and passing loop. The goods sidings closed in 1982 and the signal box closed in 1984, with both signalmen being transferred to Witton-le-Wear. The station building was built in the Gothic style and is now grade II listed. The directors of the North Eastern Railway used to meet in the building in the long room known as the 'board room.' Although the line was served by a summer only service from 1988-1992, the station did not reopen.

=== Preservation era (1993-present) ===
After all cement traffic to Eastgate ceased in 1993, the line was mothballed by British Rail, until it was saved for preservation in 2004, when services began running again between Stanhope and Wolsingham. The second platform was demolished at some point during the period 2005-2010. The station house is in private ownership, so is now fenced off from the main platform. The line subsequently extended to run between Stanhope and Bishop Auckland West, so the station is no longer a terminus.

The railway's engineering base is nearby at Wolsingham depot, where its fleet is maintained; from 2010 until 2013, it was used for coal services from Tow Law opencast mine to Scunthorpe.

== Services ==
The station is served by trains on selected days throughout the year, operated normally by either first or second generation diesel multiple units.

The service continues through to Bishop Auckland West from Stanhope, although the service sometimes terminates at Wolsingham.

Preceding station	Heritage railways	Following station
Kingfisher Halt towards Stanhope	Weardale Railway	Witton-le-Wear towards Bishop Auckland
Historical railways
Frosterley; Line open, station open	North Eastern Railway; Wear Valley Railway	Harperley; Line open, station closed
