= High Grange =

Village in County Durham, England

Coordinates: 54°40′52″N 1°43′58″W

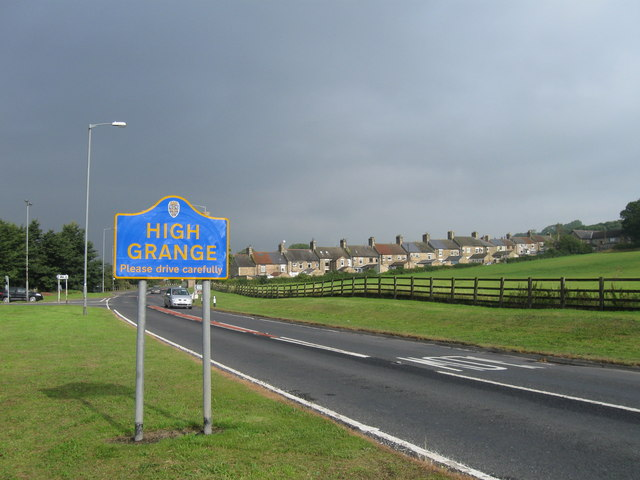

- Location within County Durham
- Population: 274 (2001 census)
- Unitary authority: County Durham
- Ceremonial county: County Durham
- Region: North East
- Country: England
- Sovereign state: United Kingdom

High Grange is a village in County Durham, in England. It is situated on the A689 between Bishop Auckland and Crook.

== History ==
The village consists of 62 brick-built houses. Although many houses are modernised (pebble-dashed etc.), and the old school rooms now house three local businesses, the village is basically as it was when built in the 1880s. It has one shop – a gun and fishing tackle shop. In the 2001 census High Grange had a population of 274.

High Grange received a grant from the National Lottery and purchased from the council the old football pitch, which is just off the main road. In July 2007, the field was refurbished to include seats, play area and a walkway, complete with drainage and fencing.

The village tries to maintain a community spirit, holding an annual 'fun day', a Christmas party and bonfire night celebrations. The tradition of 'first footing' where villagers process to each other's houses on New Year's Eve to enjoy a drink and food still continues (2007), with around a dozen households taking part.
