= High Stoop =

Village in County Durham, England

Coordinates: 54°45′26″N 1°50′26″W

High Stoop is a village in County Durham, England. It is situated a short distance to the north-west of Tow Law, on the A68.
