= Westgate-in-Weardale railway station =

Disused railway station in Westgate, County Durham

Westgate-in-Weardale

General information
- Location: Westgate, County Durham; England
- Coordinates: 54.7367°N 2.1404°W
- Grid reference: NY910397
- Platforms: 1

Other information
- Status: Disused

History
- Original company: North Eastern Railway
- Pre-grouping: North Eastern Railway
- Post-grouping: LNER

Key dates
- 21 October 1895: Opened
- 29 June 1953: Closed to passengers
- 1 July 1968: Closed to goods
Location

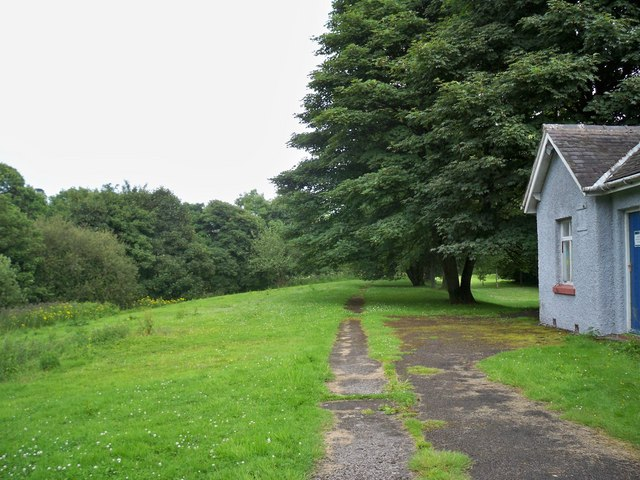
Course of the old railway at Westgate. The building on the right is the former station building, restored as a community centre. The trackbed has been filled in and landscaped - the 'path' in front of the camera is the edge of the old platform.

Westgate-in-Weardale railway station served the village of Westgate, County Durham, England, from 1895 to 1965 on the Weardale Railway.

== History ==
The station opened on 21 October 1895 by the North Eastern Railway. It was situated on the east side of a minor road. It closed to passengers in June 1953 but remained open for goods. Following its closure on November 1, 1965, St John's Chapel was converted into a public delivery siding before closing entirely to freight traffic on July 1, 1968.

Preceding station	Historical railways	Following station
St John's Chapel; Line and station closed	Weardale Railway	Eastgate-in-Weardale; Line and station closed
