= Eastgate Renewable Energy Village =

The Eastgate Renewable Energy Village (also known as Eco-Disney) is a multimillion-pound project planned for the village of Eastgate in Weardale, County Durham. The plan is to showcase five different forms of renewable energy and create a complex that includes a hotel, spa, cable car ride, 65 new homes, a cafe, viewing platforms, bird watching centre and connection with the Weardale Railway.

== History ==
In 2002, the Weardale Task Force decided that Eastgate could provide a sustainable facility as part of the wider regeneration of Weardale.

In 2004, an interim report found that the Eastgate Geothermal Exploration Borehole was capable of providing water at 26 °C, potentially providing hot water and heating for the buildings on site. The planning application was submitted in April 2008.

== Progress ==
On 29 September 2009, the plans got unanimous outline approval by the County Durham strategic planning committee. As of October 2009, the plans awaited examination by Government Office North East, who will decide whether to call in the decision or give it full approval.

In September 2010, £1 million funding that was to be received was cancelled as part of the government's budget cut programme, leaving the project's future in serious doubt. It is hoped the money will be raised through the private sector.

== Controversy ==
Opinion seems to be split on the benefits of the project. Supporters claim it will provide 350 jobs, encourage eco-friendly lifestyles, act as a prototype for other similar projects and regenerate a region left devastated by foot and mouth and the closure of the Lafarge Cement UK works, potentially turning the area into a tourist attraction comparable with the Lake District.

Objectors claim the development would ruin the scenery, that the hot springs lack the heat needed for success, the energy created would be insignificant and that large quantities of fuel sources would need to be transported to Weardale.
