= Frosterley railway station =

Railway station in County Durham, England

Frosterley is a railway station on the Weardale Railway, and serves the village of Frosterley in Weardale, England. First opened in 1847, the station closed to passengers in 1953, before reopening again in 2004. The station is situated 13.75 miles (22.1 kilometres) from Bishop Auckland.

== History ==
Frostereley
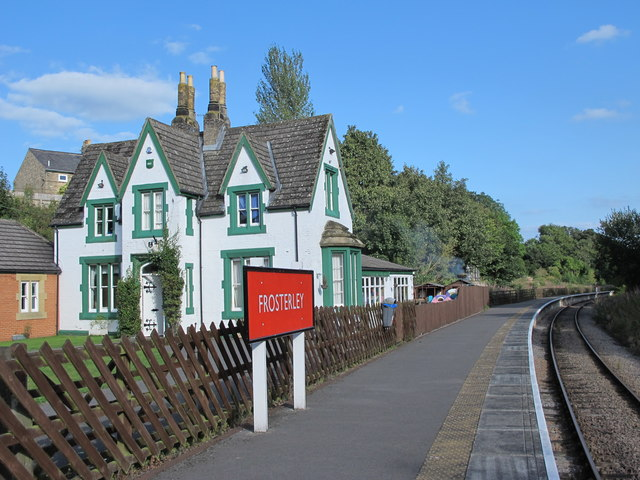

General information
- Location: Frosterley, County Durham; England
- System: Station on Heritage Railway
- Manager: Weardale Railway
- Platforms: 1

History
- Original company: Frosterly and Stanhope Railway
- Pre-grouping: North Eastern Railway
- Post-grouping: London and North Eastern Railway

Key dates
- 1847: Opened
- 1953: Closed to Passengers
- 1969: Closed Completely
- 2004: Reopened on Weardale Railway
Location

=== Pre-preservation (1847–1993) ===
The station opened as the original terminus of the Wear Valley Railway from Etherley (Witton Park) on the 3 August 1847, along with a branch into Bishopley Quarry. It is believed by the Weardale Railway that there may have been a wooden engine shed built in the 1850s, which was later transferred up to Stanhope when the line extended in 1862. The line later extended to Wearhead in 1895, before the last day of passenger service on 27 June 1953. The line from St John's Chapel to Wearhead closed completely in 1961, and the line from Eastgate to St John's Chapel followed in 1968. While the line remained open for freight trains to and from Eastgate Cement Works, the station was closed completely in 1969, having had no goods traffic since 1967. The line reopened for a Summer Sunday only service from 1988-1992, but Frosterley did not reopen, and the line closed completely in 1993, and was mothballed by British Rail.

=== Preservation era (1993–present) ===
The line was purchased by Weardale Railways Limited in 2004, and services began running again, originally between Stanhope and Wolsingham only. A marble sculpture was unveiled at Frosterley in honour of the reopening. The line later extended to Bishop Auckland West in 2010. The station building is now in private ownership, and is fenced off from the platform.

== Services ==
In 1938, the line was served by eight trains a day, but by closure in 1953 this had reduced to 4 trains a day.

Today, the station is served on selected days throughout the year, largely at weekends, using the railway's fleet of first and second generation diesel multiple units. The station is served on all days that the line is open, with services either going between Stanhope and Wolsingham or Bishop Auckland depending on that day's timetable.

Preceding station	Heritage railways	Following station
Stanhope Terminus	Weardale Railway	Kingfisher Halt towards Bishop Auckland
Historical railways
Stanhope; Line open, station open	North Eastern Railway; Frosterly and Stanhope Railway	Wolsingham; Line open, station open
