= Crook railway station =

Railway station in Crook, County Durham, England

Crook
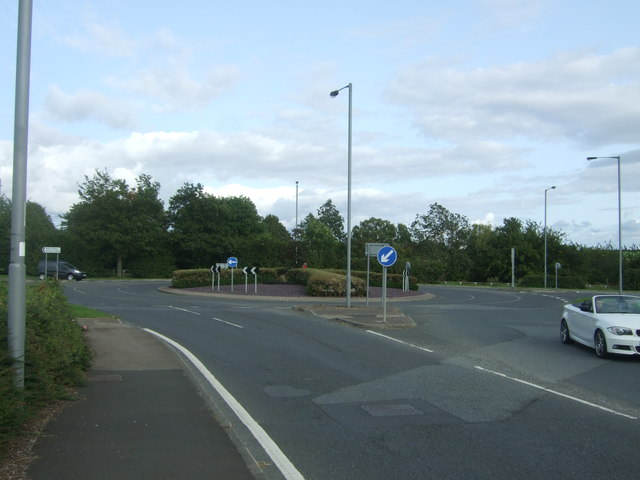

General information
- Location: Crook, County Durham; England
- Coordinates: 54.715587°N 1.744621°W
- Grid reference: NZ163358
- Platforms: 1

Other information
- Status: Disused

History
- Original company: Bishop Auckland and Weardale Railway
- Pre-grouping: North Eastern Railway
- Post-grouping: London and North Eastern Railway

Key dates
- January 1844: Station opened
- 8 March 1965: Station closed to passengers
- 5 July 1965: Station closed completely
Location

Crook railway station served the town of Crook, County Durham, England. It was located on the Bishop Auckland and Weardale Railway line from Bishop Auckland to Blackhill between Wear Valley Junction and Tow Law.

== History ==
The Stockton and Darlington Railway backed Bishop Auckland and Weardale Railway had received Parliamentary backing to build a railway from Shildon via Bishop Auckland to the town of Crook in 1842. The line was duly completed the following year, with trains running as far as Bishop Auckland from 30 January 1843 and through to Crook from 8 November that year (albeit for goods traffic only). The exact opening date for passenger traffic isn't known, though authorisation was granted on 3 January 1844 for services to begin – these ran initially on Thursdays-only to serve the Crook town market day (being so listed in the July 1844 issue of Bradshaw's Railway Guide), but by January 1845 the station was in full-time use.

The S&D subsequently extended the route northwards from Crook as the Weardale Extension Railway (WXR) towards Tow Law and Waskerley in May 1845, where it joined the Stanhope and Tyne Railway. This route was built to give the Derwent Iron Company a southward outlet for its works at Consett – it included a rope-worked incline at Sunnyside and began to carry passenger traffic in 1847, which was also the year that the WXR was amalgamated with the BA&WR.

The station was initially noted as being at the end of a short stub off the two main lines following the opening of the route northwards, but a replacement through station was authorised by the S&D in September 1856; this was subsequently built and commissioned but the precise opening date was not recorded. This only had the one (reversible) platform on a loop off the main line – a configuration that was used in several other locations on the S&D system (e.g. North Road, Redcar Central and Bishop Auckland itself), with a sizeable goods yard nearby that served the adjacent Pease's West Colliery, coke ovens, fire clay works and chemical plant. Another route to the town - the Deerness Valley Railway from Durham via Waterhouses was completed in January 1858 – this joined the WXR route just north of the town and was constructed by the S&D at the behest of Joseph Pease, whose company owned the colliery & associated Bank Foot industrial complex opposite the station. This route though was only used by goods traffic, as passenger trains terminated at Waterhouses throughout the line's existence (final closure occurring in December 1964).

The S&D duly took over the BA&WR in 1858, which in turn became part of the North Eastern Railway in 1863. This led to a number of infrastructure improvements on the route, including the replacement of the Sunnyside incline with a less-steeply graded deviation along with new station at Tow Law from 2 March 1868 and the commissioning of a connection onto the recently opened Derwent Valley Line near Blackhill that gave access to Newcastle Central on 6 May the same year. Passenger services could then run through from Darlington to Blackhill and beyond - this was the usual pattern of service in NER days. From 1896, it was also possible to reach Newcastle via Consett following the completion of upgrade work on the original S&T route through Annfield Plain.

The station passed into the hands of the London and North Eastern Railway at the 1923 Grouping and subsequently into the North Eastern Region of British Railways upon nationalisation in January 1948.

== Decline and closure ==
Passenger traffic on the thinly-populated part of the route north of Tow Law was never particularly plentiful (especially after the decline of industrial activity in the area from the early 1930s onwards) and services from there through to Blackhill were withdrawn by the LNER on 1 May 1939. Trains thereafter terminated at Tow Law until it in turn was closed by the British Transport Commission on 11 June 1956, leaving Crook as the terminus of passenger services from Darlington & Bishop Auckland. These went over to Diesel Multiple Unit operation in 1958 (along with most routes in the area) and whilst this initially led to an increase in passenger numbers, the station was still one of those listed for closure in Richard Beeching's 1963 Reshaping of British Railways report. This may well have been due to the decline in the town's population in the wake of the closure of many of the local collieries (including the local Pease's West pit) from 1960 onwards. Passenger services from Bishop Auckland were withdrawn on 8 March 1965 and the station closed completely four months later on 5 July when goods traffic ceased. It remained intact until the end of 1967, when the redundant route from Wear Valley Junction was finally dismantled by British Rail.

== The Site Today ==
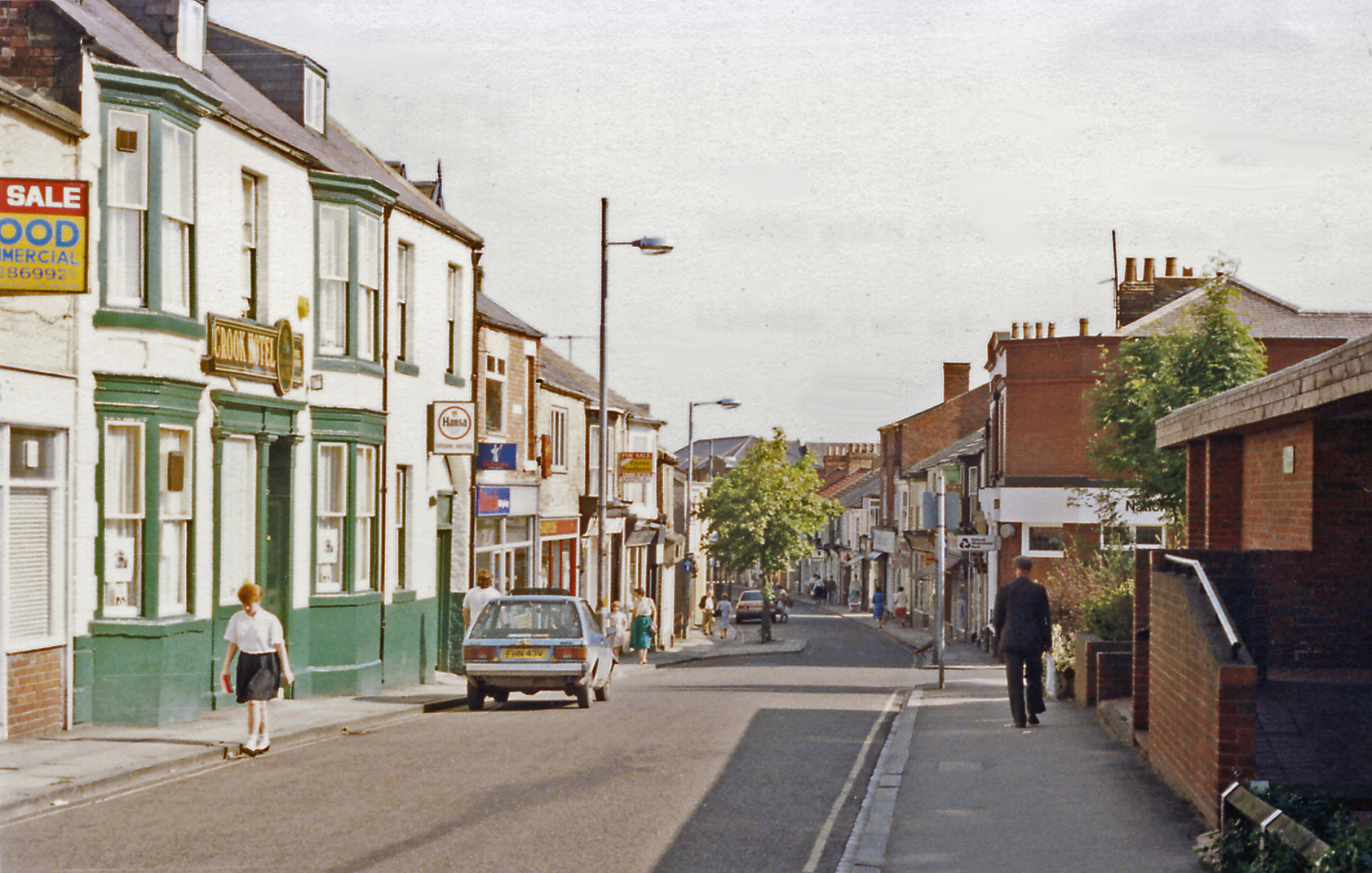
Crook High Hope St in the vicinity of the old station site, 1988

No trace of the station remains today - all of the buildings were demolished and the area cleared after the track was removed in 1967–8. The re-aligned B6298 road now uses the route of the old railway trackbed through the town, whilst a doctor's surgery occupies part of the station site. The formation of the Deerness Valley line from the outskirts of the town has been converted into a footpath & cycleway

Preceding station	Historical railways	Following station
Beechburn; Line and station closed	North Eastern Railway; Weardale Extension Railway	Tow Law; Line and station closed
