= Weardale Railway =

Heritage railway in County Durham, England

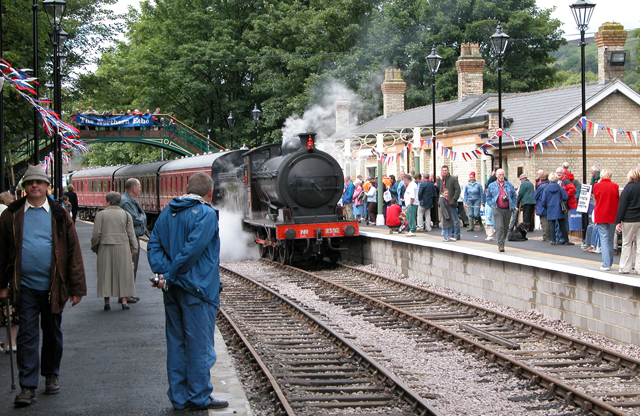
- Stanhope Station, 2004
- Locale: County Durham

Commercial operations
- Name: Weardale Railway
- Original gauge: 4 ft 8 1/2 in (1,435 mm) standard gauge

Preserved operations
- Owned by: Auckland Project
- Stations: 6
- Length: 18 mi (29 km)
- Preserved gauge: 4 ft 8 1/2 in (1,435 mm) standard gauge

Commercial history
- Opened: 19 April 1842
- 30 January 1843: Passenger service started
- 8 November 1843: Freight service started
- Closed to passengers: 1953
- Closed: 1992

Preservation history
- Late 2009: Reconnected to the National Network
- 23 May 2010: Weardale Railway resumes passenger service
- Easter 2016: Witton-le-Wear reopens
- Headquarters: Stanhope

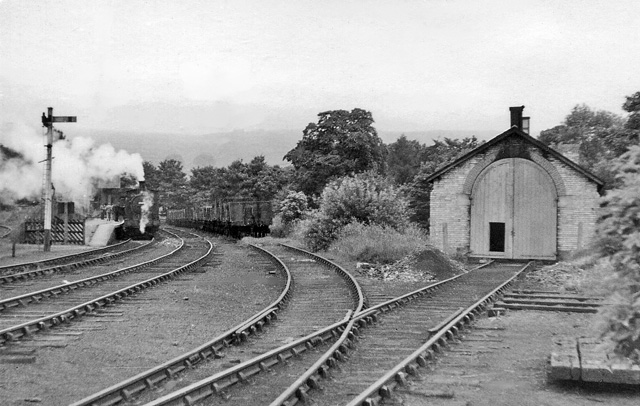
Wearhead railway station and engine shed on the last day of passenger service in 1953

The Weardale Railway is an independently owned British single-track branch line heritage railway between Bishop Auckland and Stanhope. The railway began services in July 2004. The line was purchased by the Auckland Project in 2020 with a view to restarting regular passenger services. In 2021, a bid was submitted to the Restoring Your Railway fund. In October 2021, the Department for Transport allocated funding for the development of a business case. By 2024 progress appeared to have stalled, with the scrapping of the Restoring Your Railway fund.

The railway originally ran from Bishop Auckland to Wearhead in County Durham, North-East England, a distance of 25 miles (40 km), built in the 19th century to carry limestone from Eastgate-in-Weardale, and provide passenger services to Weardale. Passenger services ceased in 1953, leaving only freight services to Eastgate until 1992.

After the quarry's owner Lafarge moved to road transport in 1993, the line was threatened with closure by British Rail (BR), and it was taken over by a group of enthusiasts. The Weardale Railway currently runs for 18 miles (29 km) between Bishop Auckland and the site of Eastgate-in-Weardale Station, making the line one of the longest preserved standard gauge heritage railways in Great Britain.

== History ==
Bishop Auckland gained its first rail link in 1842, when the Stockton and Darlington Railway (S&DR) backed Bishop Auckland and Weardale Railway (BA&WR) gained the powers via the Bishop Auckland and Weardale Railway Act 1837 (7 Will. 4 & 1 Vict. c. cxxii) to build a railway line from the S&DR's station at Shildon via Bishop Auckland and Witton-le-Wear into Crook, County Durham. The BA&WR initially built a temporary terminus at South Church, which opened on 19 April 1842. After completion of the Shildon Tunnel, the BA&WR erected a permanent station on the current site, which opened to freight on 8 November 1843, and passengers on 30 January 1843. All operations were sub-leased as agreed to the S&DR.

In 1844, after the West Durham Railway extended from a junction with the Clarence Railway at Byers Green to Crook, the S&DR extended the BA&WR from Bishop Auckland along the river valley to Witton-le-Wear, and then into Crook. In 1845, the S&DR came to an agreement with the Derwent Iron Company to sub-lease the southern section of the former Stanhope and Tyne Railway. It extended the line from Crook to Waskerley and then to Blackhill. That line was opened as the Weardale Extension Railway (WXR).

In July 1845 Parliament passed the Wear Valley Railway Act 1845 (8 & 9 Vict. c. clii), which allowed the extension of the BA&WR from a junction at Witton-le-Wear to Frosterley, and a small branch line across the river to Bishopley. With all works again undertaken by the S&DR, this line opened on 3 August 1847. After these works had been completed, the BA&WR amalgamated with the WXR. All services were operated by the S&DR, which officially took over the new company in January 1857.

The Frosterly and Stanhope Railway Act 1862 (25 & 26 Vict. c. xl) was passed allowing the S&DR-backed Frosterly and Stanhope Railway to extend the line to Stanhope, thus allowing trains to transport limestone from the Newlandside Estate on the south side of the town.

The final extension of the Weardale Railway to Wearhead opened on 21 October 1895. Between Eastgate and Westgate at Cambo Keels, sidings were established to serve the Weardale Iron Company's Heights limestone quarry, which is still in operation today.

=== Decline and closure ===
As elsewhere the UK, rail traffic in the area declined after World War II, with the Wearhead branch the first to lose its passenger trains in 1953. The principal closures came in the 1960s, post the Beeching axe. Services to Barnard Castle via West Auckland ended in 1962, those to Durham in 1964, and to Crook in 1965. That left only the former original S&DR line to Darlington line in operation, along with the freight-only branch traffic to Eastgate.

Durham County Council recognised the value of the line to leisure services by 1983 when, with the patronage of botanist and TV presenter David Bellamy, intermittent specials began to serve Stanhope again under the banner of The Heritage Line, because of the S&DR association. This became a scheduled weekend-only summer service, printed in BR public timetables, between 23 May 1988 and 27 September 1992. Etherley, otherwise known as Witton Park Station, was re-opened on 21 August 1991. It has not re-opened under the post 2010 Weardale Railway operation.

In March 1993, Lafarge decided to service the Eastgate cement works by road and end its use of rail. British Rail then announced its intention to close the line due to the loss of revenue. Local authorities sought another use for the line and considered that the only immediate possibility was a steam-hauled tourist service.

== Preservation Era ==
=== Early Preservation History 1993-2008 ===
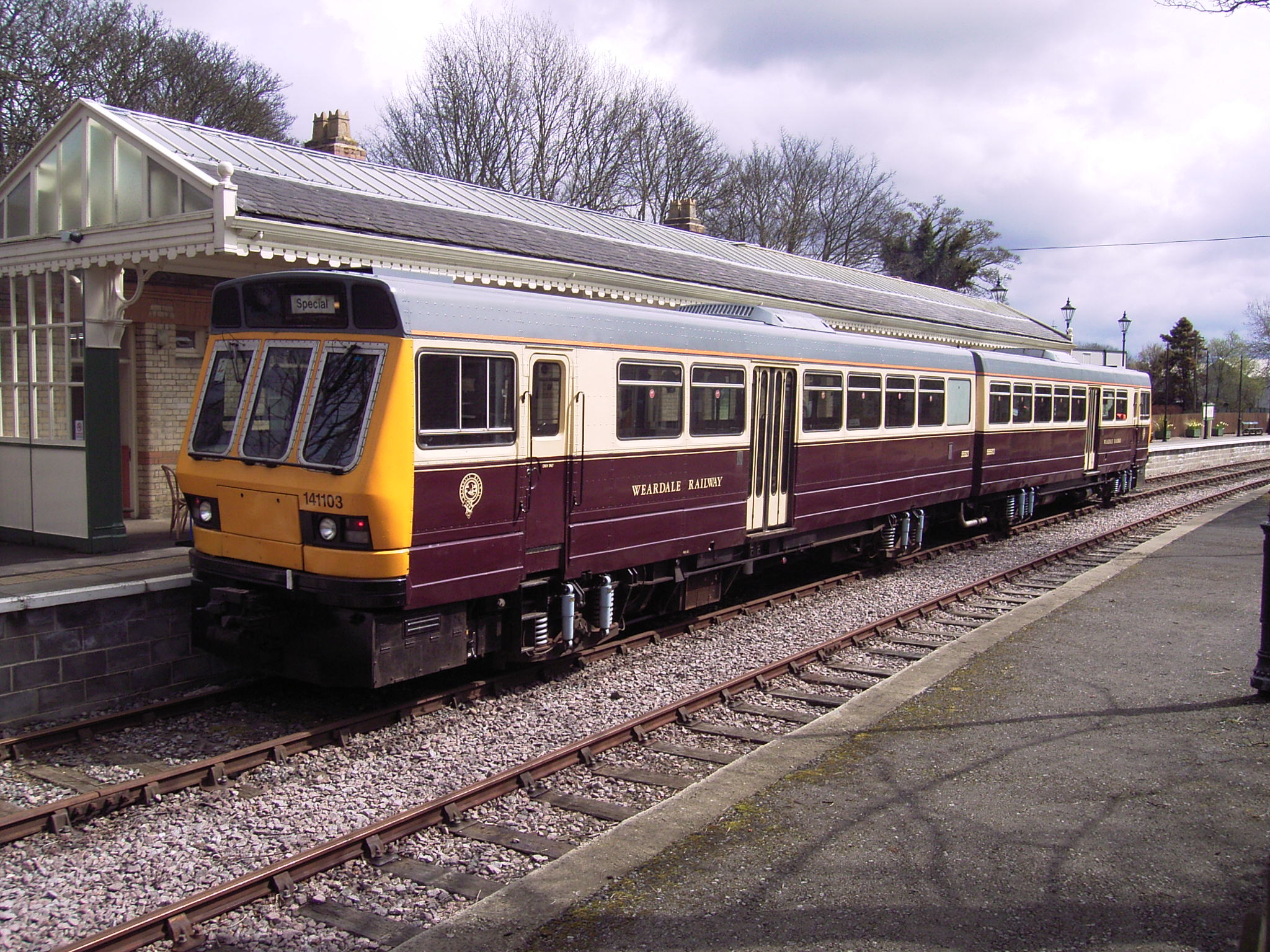
Until 2012, a class 141 railbus formed the majority of passenger services on the Weardale Railway; here 141103 is pictured at Stanhope station in early 2008

The Weardale Railway preservation project was founded in 1993, with the intention that a private company should take ownership of the line and start a steam service for tourists on the scenic western section. The operating company was known as the Weardale Railways Ltd, a company limited by guarantee.

The Weardale Railway Trust (WRT) is a voluntary group whose members are supporters of the project. WRT was initially just a supporters' club but it assumed a more prominent role as Weardale Railways Ltd got into difficulties. In 2006 WRT took a 12.5% minority stake in the ownership of Weardale Railways Ltd.

Large sums of public sector grant finance were obtained or conditionally pledged from various donors including the regional development agency (One NorthEast), Durham County Council and the Wear Valley District Council. The Manpower Services Commission contributed to the wages of paid staff in what had become an area of high unemployment, and this allowed a 40-strong workforce to be recruited, a depot and base of operations to be established at Wolsingham and the station at Stanhope to be restored. Services started in July 2004, initially from Wolsingham to Stanhope but with the intention of extending them along the full length of the remaining line. There were even plans to rebuild the Eastgate to Wearhead section which had been lifted. The line subsequently went into administration in January 2005, just 7 months after it reopened.

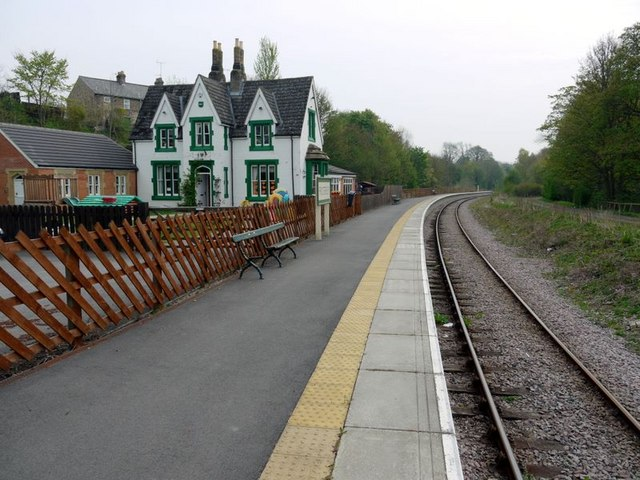
Frosterley Station, 2009

Eventually, a community interest company known as Ealing Community Transport agreed to pay £100,000 for a 75% stake in Weardale Railways Ltd and provide management support to the project. Ealing Community Transport also agreed to underwrite any further operating losses incurred by Weardale Railways Ltd. This undertaking was sufficient to allow the creditors of Weardale Railways Ltd to permit the resumption of limited services on the line in August 2006.

=== British American Railway Services ownership 2008-2020 ===
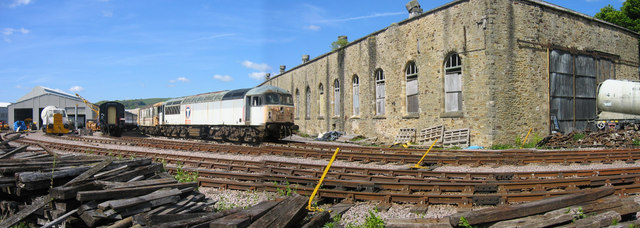
Wolsingham depot, May 2009

In September 2008, Ealing Community Transport's 75% interest in WRC was transferred to British American Railway Services, a wholly owned subsidiary of US private company Iowa Pacific Holdings. Ed Ellis, the spokesman for these firms, visited the Weardale Railway in October 2008, and announced an intention to reopen the line to Bishop Auckland by the end of 2008.

In October 2008, the line's paid staff and volunteers undertook the "Brush Blitz" to clear 14 years of vegetation growth from the track between Wolsingham and Bishop Auckland. After two damaged sections of track were repaired, in early 2009 a passenger-carrying Wickham trolley (light rail vehicle) was able to negotiate the line from Wolsingham to within sight of Bishop Auckland station. Ellis also announced plans to build a rail freight terminal at Eastgate for the loading of aggregates from local quarries together with other freight, including mineral, food and agricultural commodities.

On 27 March 2009 the railway's website reported that Network Rail had undertaken to re-install missing points and crossings at Bishop Auckland to reconnect the Weardale Line with the national rail network. It was stated that this would be done before 31 July 2009. Network Rail completed the connection in early September 2009. On 29 September 2009, the development of the Eastgate Renewable Energy Village received unanimous outline approval by the County Durham strategic planning committee, thus providing a potential boost to the line's future prospects. By 2013 this project appeared stalled.

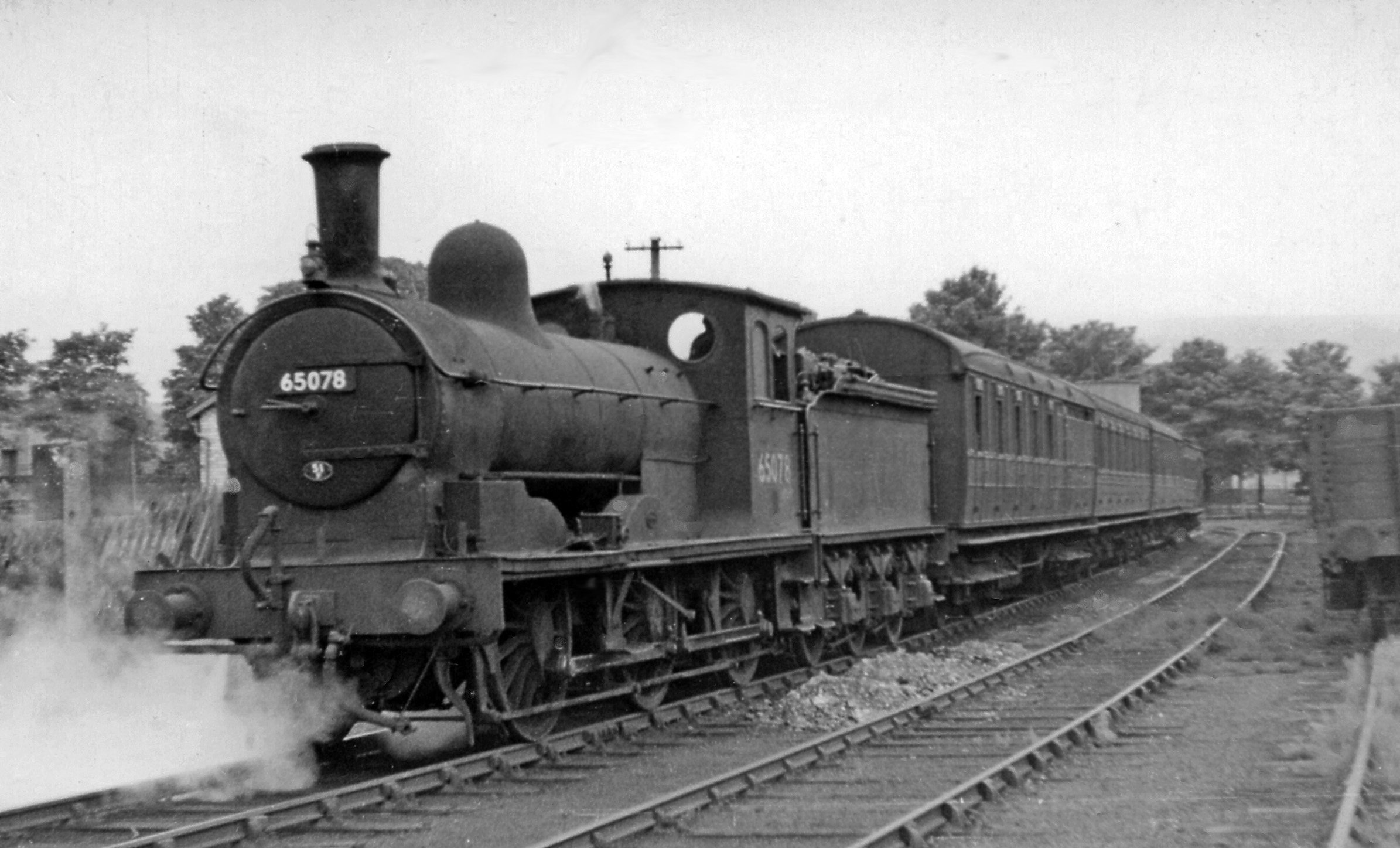
Last train waiting to leave Wearhead station in 1953

On 25 January 2010, Her Majesty's Railway Inspectorate travelled on the Weardale line checking bridges, fences and crossings along the 18-mile (29 km) stretch between Stanhope and Bishop Auckland. Only a few minor works were needed to get the line ready for passenger use, and these were completed in time for a London King's Cross to Stanhope charter train to run. In February 2010, this became the first mainline passenger service to travel the line since the 1980s. It was followed on 27 February by a railtour from Crewe to Stanhope, operated by Spitfire Railtours.

Regular passenger services to Bishop Auckland West started on 23 May 2010, with 5 trains a day running between Stanhope and Bishop Auckland West, ending in 2012. For the 2013 season a scheduled service was not offered, the railway instead offering themed operations, such as Dine and Ride and the Polar Express. Since 2014, the Railway Trust has operated passenger trains on selected weekdays and weekends for mostly tourist traffic using a Class 122 "Bubble Car". Initially, this only ran between Wolsingham and Stanhope but, on 27 March 2016, this service was extended to Witton-le-Wear. In April 2018, the Weardale Railway CIC announced that works had commenced to lift a short section of track at Broken Banks (approximately 1/2 mile (800 m) west of Bishop Auckland) to enable the embankment to be repaired after subsidence had made the line unusable for passenger traffic. Once the works were completed it was intended to reinstate the tracks and extend the Stanhope to Witton-le-Wear passenger service back to Bishop Auckland West station.

After receiving planning permission to load opencast coal, mined in the Crook area, alterations and arrangements were made to the Weardale Railway Depot at Wolsingham, to receive and transship the coal from road to rail. The first loaded coal train left Wolsingham on 16 June 2011 bound for steel works in Scunthorpe. Later, services were extended to include the power station at Ratcliffe-on-Soar, near Nottingham. This became a five-train-a-week operation that operated until 2 October 2013, and halted as a result of the financial collapse of UK Coal, following the spoil tip landslip that destroyed the connecting railway at Hatfield Colliery in February 2013, preventing coal shipments, and the underground fire at Daw Mill Colliery the following month which plunged UK Coal into financial crisis.

=== Auckland Project ownership 2020-present ===
In February 2020, Iowa-Pacific, the parent company of British American Railway Services, announced its intention to sell the line. It was purchased in March 2020 by the Auckland Project, a County Durham charity. After a period of closure while the company waited for a licence to operate, services to Wolsingham resumed in May 2022 and services to Bishop Auckland West resumed in April 2023. As of 2025, the railway operates trains using its DMU fleet on select weekends and weekdays, with some trains only going as far as Wolsingham. In addition, the railway offers driver experiences using an 0-6-0 Sentinel, and special event services throughout the year.

== Rolling stock ==
Diesel multiple units
Number	Class	Status	Livery	Photograph	Notes
M50980/M52054	Class 108	Operational	British Railways Green with Speed Whiskers		Returned to traffic in 2024
55012	Class 122	Operational	British Railways Green		
142078	Class 142	Operational	Northern Rail		
142094	Class 142	Operational	First North Western		

Diesel Locomotives
Number	Class	Status	Livery	Photograph	Notes
31285	Class 31	Operational	Network Rail Yellow with Headlights		5 large headlight brackets were fitted in 2003 by Network Rail for departmental use, and are still fitted.
31459	Class 31	Operational	British Rail Blue		
31465	Class 31	Operational	Network Rail Yellow	A class 31 in full yellow stationary at a Platform	
37042	Class 37	Under restoration	EWS Maroon & Gold		Moved to the railway in 2026

The railway also has a Sentinel 0-6-0 shunter used for driver experiences

Steam Locomotives
Number	Builder	Status	Livery	Photograph	Notes
No.40	Robert Stephenson and Hawthorn	Undergoing Overhaul	Black with Weardale Railway Emblem		Bought by the railway in 2006, removed from service in 2012 for overhaul, yet to return to service

The railway has collection of ex-Greater Anglia Mark 3 carriages used on locomotive hauled services.

== Stations of the Weardale Railway ==
Point	Coordinates (Links to map resources)	OS Grid Ref	Notes
Westgate-in-Weardale	54.7372°N 2.1404°W	NY91053803	Closed
Eastgate-in-Weardale Station	54.7418°N 2.0689°W	NY95663853	Closed
Stanhope Station	54.7433°N 2.0031°W	NY99893870	
Frosterley Station	54.7270°N 1.9640°W	NZ02413689	
Kingfisher Leisure Park Halt	54.7258°N 1.9286°W	NZ04693675	
Wolsingham Station	54.7263°N 1.8843°W	NZ07543681	
Harperley	54.7080°N 1.8208°W	NZ11643479	Disused
Witton-le-Wear	54.6764°N 1.7666°W	NZ15143128	
Wear Valley Junction	54.6808°N 1.7432°W	NZ16653177	Disused
Etherley	54.6668°N 1.7294°W	NZ17553022	Disused
Bishop Auckland West	54.6571°N 1.6815°W	NZ20642915	

- Westgate-In-Weardale Station (Planned)
- Eastgate-In-Weardale Station (Planned)
- Stanhope Station (Open)
- Frosterley Station (Open)
- Kingfisher Leisure Park Halt Station (Open)
- Wolsingham Station (Open)
- Harperley Station (Currently Disused)
- Witton-le-Wear Station (Open) (Re-opened, Easter 2016)
- Wear Valley Junction (Currently Disused)
- Etherley Station (Currently Disused)
- Bishop Auckland West Station (Open) (not in regular use 2012–2018; reopened during gala in April 2018 and regular services reintroduced in July 2018)
