= Tow Law railway station =

Disused railway station in Tow Law, County Durham

Tow Law
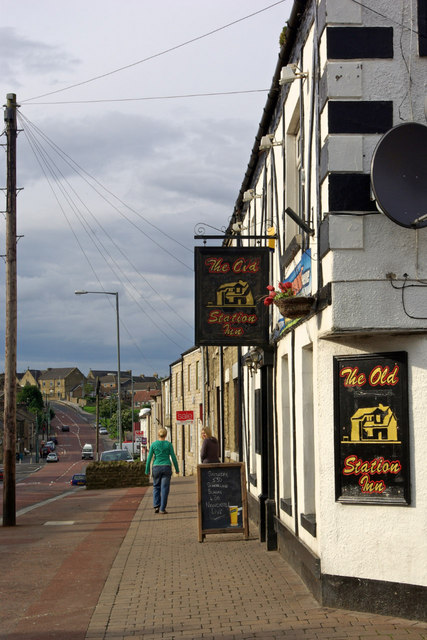
- The Station Inn in Tow Law

General information
- Location: Tow Law, County Durham; England
- Coordinates: 54.7459°N 1.815°W
- Grid reference: NZ120390
- Platforms: 1 (first site); 2 (second site)

Other information
- Status: Disused

History
- Original company: Stockton and Darlington Railway
- Pre-grouping: North Eastern Railway
- Post-grouping: LNER

Key dates
- September 1847: First station opened
- 2 March 1868: First station closed to passengers and resited
- 11 June 1956: Second station closed to passengers
- 5 July 1965: Both stations closed to goods traffic
Location

Tow Law railway station served the town of Tow Law, County Durham, England, from 1847 to 1965 on the Stanhope and Tyne Railway.

== History ==
The first station opened in September 1847 by the North Eastern Railway. It was situated on the west side of High Street. It was resited on 2 March 1868 in between Station Road and Church Lane when the Sunnyside deviation opened, although the first site remained for goods traffic. Six blast furnaces were built and served by nearby collieries. Atwood Iron Works closed in 1882 but more iron works opened up around the town. The station building was on the down side and the signal box was at the west end of the up platform. This controlled access to the goods yard which was to the west of the station. On the downside of the goods yard were four sidings, the northernmost siding serving a stone goods shed and the southernmost siding passing the cattle dock. Private sidings served various collieries, gas works, iron works and depots. The station lost passenger traffic, albeit not much as the section of the line to Blackhill closed on 1 May 1939. The line closed completely around 1951 and Tow Law became a terminus for Darlington services, although this didn't last for long. Passenger services were withdrawn on 11 June 1956 and goods traffic ceased for both stations on 5 July 1965. The track was lifted from 1966–1967 and it was demolished in 1973. The site is now occupied by Alpine Way housing.

Preceding station	Historical railways	Following station
High Stoop; Line and station closed	Stanhope and Tyne Railway	Crook; Line and station closed
