= Bishop Auckland railway station =

Railway station in County Durham, England

Bishop Auckland
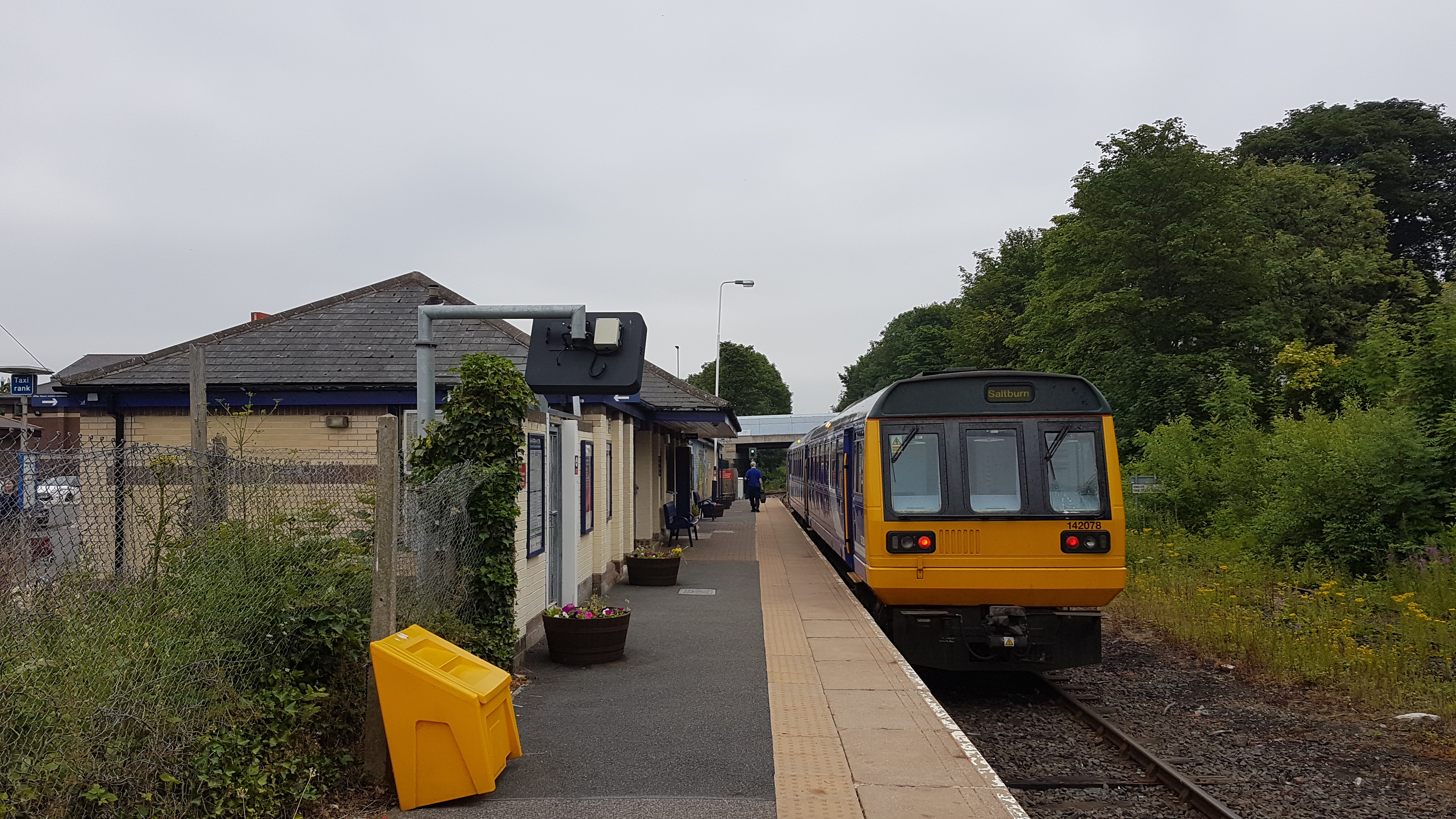
- A Class 142 unit at the station (2018)

General information
- Location: Bishop Auckland, County Durham, England
- Coordinates: 54°39′26″N 1°40′41″W
- Grid reference: NZ208291
- Owner: Network Rail
- Manager: Northern Trains
- Platforms: 1
- Tracks: 2

Other information
- Station code: BIA
- Classification: DfT category F1

History
- Original company: Bishop Auckland & Weardale Railway
- Pre-grouping: North Eastern Railway
- Post-grouping: London & North Eastern Railway; British Rail (North Eastern Region)

Key dates
- 8 November 1843: Opened
- 1986: Rebuilt

Passengers
- 2021/22: ▲0.146 million
- 2022/23: ▲0.154 million
- 2023/24: ▲0.156 million
- 2024/25: ▲0.169 million
- 2025/26: ▲0.190 million
Location
- Location within County Durham
Notes
- Passenger statistics from the Office of Rail and Road

Bishop Auckland is a railway station that serves the market town of Bishop Auckland, in County Durham, England. It lies 11 miles 77 chains (19.3 km) north-west of Darlington. The station is the Western terminus of the Tees Valley Line, which links it to Saltburn via Darlington. It is owned by Network Rail and managed by Northern Trains. Bishop Auckland West, 150 m to the west, is the terminus of the Weardale Railway, and opened in 2010.

== History ==
=== Opening ===
Bishop Auckland gained its first railway link in 1842, when the Stockton and Darlington Railway (S&DR) backed Bishop Auckland and Weardale Railway (BA&WR) built the railway line authorised by the Bishop Auckland and Weardale Railway Act 1837 (7 Will. 4 & 1 Vict. c. cxxii) from the S&DR's station at Shildon, via Bishop Auckland and Witton-le-Wear, into Crook.

The company initially built a temporary terminus at South Church, which opened on 19 April 1842. A road coach service then extended the service into Bishop Auckland and a secondary road coach service also ran to Rainton Meadows. After completion of the Shildon Tunnel, the BA&WR erected a permanent station on the current site, which opened to freight on 8 November 1843 and passengers on 30 January 1843. All operations were sub-leased to the S&DR.

=== Early developments ===
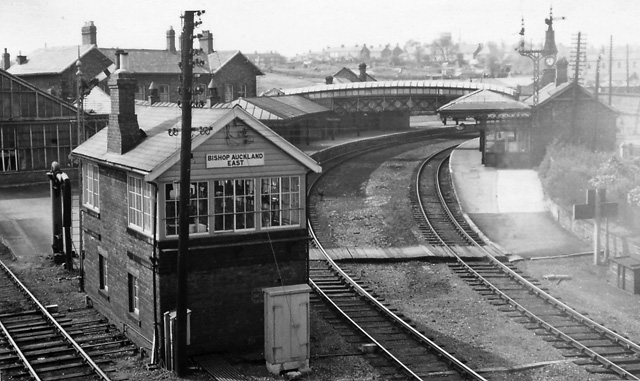
View along the curved platforms in 1965

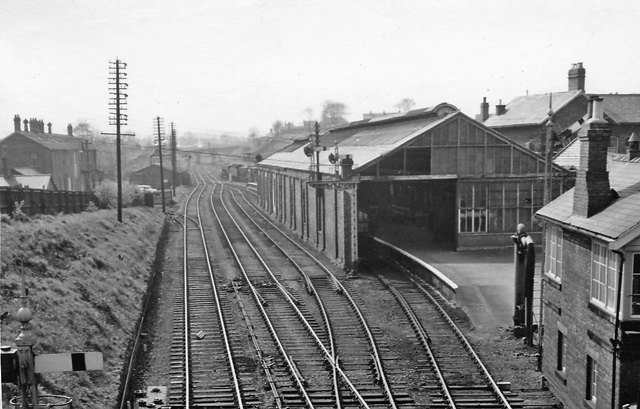
View westward along the main platform in 1965

In 1844, after the West Durham Railway extended from a junction with the Clarence Railway at Byers Green to Crook, the S&DR extended the BA&WR from Bishop Auckland along the river valley to Witton-le-Wear, and then into Crook. In 1845, the S&DR came to an agreement with the Derwent Iron Company to sub-lease the southern section of the former Stanhope and Tyne Railway. It extended the line from Crook to Waskerley and then to Blackhill; it was opened as the Weardale Extension Railway (WXR).

In July 1845, Parliament passed the Wear Valley Railway Act 1845 (8 & 9 Vict. c. clii), which allowed the extension of the BA&WR from a junction at Witton-le-Wear to Frosterley, and a small branch line across the river to Bishopley. With all works again undertaken by the S&DR, this line opened on 3 August 1847. After these works had been completed, the BA&WR amalgamated with the WXR. All services were operated by the S&DR, which officially took over the new company in January 1857.

On 1 April 1857, the North Eastern Railway (NER) started a service from Durham to Bishop Auckland at a new terminus in Tenter Street. However, the S&DR and NER quickly came to the agreement of development of a joint station in the town, and so rebuilt the existing former BA&WR station, with NER trains using it from December 1857.

The Frosterly and Stanhope Railway Act 1862 (25 & 26 Vict. c. xl) was passed allowing the S&DR-backed Frosterly and Stanhope Railway to extend the line to Stanhope, thus allowing trains to transport limestone from the Newlandside Estate on the south side of the town. This brought about the extension of the South Durham and Lancashire Union Railway from Barnard Castle into Bishop Auckland in 1862, and with the final addition of traffic from an extension of the Clarence Railway at Byers Green, eventually resulted in the NER rebuilding the station again in December 1867.

The final extension of the Weardale Railway to Wearhead opened on 21 October 1895, with the NER having resited the station at Stanhope to provide a more suitable gradient for the heavy limestone trains. Between Eastgate and Westgate at Cambo Keels, sidings were established to serve the Weardale Iron Company's Heights limestone quarry, which is still in operation today. This final extension of the Weardale Railway bought about the final and largest layout of Bishop Auckland railway station, which was now rebuilt in triangular form with four platforms in 1905.

=== Decline ===
As elsewhere in the UK, rail traffic in the area declined after World War II, with the Wearhead branch the first to lose its passenger trains in 1953. The principal closures came in the 1960s, mainly as a result of the Beeching cuts, with services to:

- Barnard Castle, via West Auckland, ending in June 1962
- Durham in May 1964
- Crook in March 1965.

This left only the former original S&DR line to Darlington in operation, along with the freight-only branch traffic to Eastgate. In 1976, the disused platform was reinstated avoiding need for passengers to use a footbridge.

The station remained more or less intact, although increasingly forlorn and run-down, for more than 20 years thereafter; by the early 1980s, only the former platform 3 was in use along with the former Bishop Auckland East signal box. It was eventually replaced by the current structure on 6 June 1986, which stands on the site of the former Crook branch platform, on a siding off the now single line which continues towards Stanhope and Eastgate. The signal box was abolished at the same time, with neighbouring Shildon box assuming control of the much-simplified layout.

The remaining station buildings were then demolished, and the site was sold off for retail redevelopment. The former goods yard is now a supermarket with carpark, and the Durham platform is now the site of a cycling and motoring store and a bank.

== Facilities ==
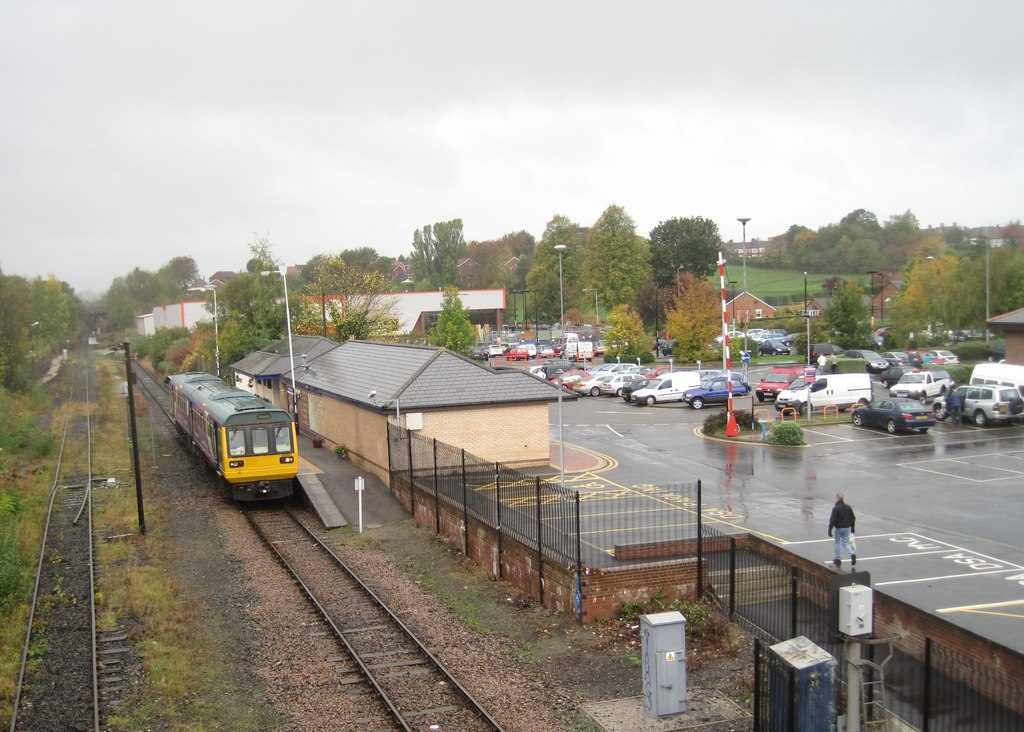
A Class 142 unit waits in the platform to form a westbound service

The station is currently operated by Northern Trains, which provides National Rail passenger services.

In 2012, Bishop Trains adopted the station from Northern Rail, the operator at the time, providing a ticket office and staff for the station. Bishop Trains now provides a booking service for coach trips and holidays, and more recently, rail charters. It is staffed six day per week. Service running information is offered by timetable posters and Bishop Trains staff. Step-free access is available from the main entrance to the ticket office and platform.

In 2014, the station was revamped. A glass-fronted waiting room was constructed on the former toilet block, alongside a new toilet and office. Digital CIS displays have also been installed, as part of a scheme to provide these at most stations in the area.

== Services ==
The station is served by an hourly service to Saltburn, via Darlington and Middlesbrough, operated by Northern Trains.

Rolling stock used: Class 156 Super Sprinter and Class 158 Express Sprinter

Preceding station	National Rail	Following station
Terminus	Northern Trains; Tees Valley Line	Shildon
Preceding station	Heritage railways	Following station
Witton-le-Wear towards Stanhope	Weardale Railway	Terminus
Disused railways
Terminus	North Eastern Railway; Clarence Railway; Byers Green Branch	Coundon; Line and station closed
Hunwick; Line and station closed	North Eastern Railway; Durham–Bishop Auckland Line	Terminus
Terminus	North Eastern Railway; South Durham & Lancashire Union Railway	West Auckland; Line and station closed
Historical railways
Etherley; Line open; station closed	Stockton & Darlington Railway; Bishop Auckland & Weardale Railway	South Church; Line open; station closed

== Bibliography ==
- Body, G. (1988). PSL Field Guides - Railways of the Eastern Region Volume 2. Wellingborough: Patrick Stephens Ltd. ISBN 1-85260-072-1.
- Butt, R.V.J. (1995). The Directory of Railway Stations. Yeovil: Patrick Stephens Ltd. ISBN 1-85260-508-1. R508.
- Marshall, Geoff; Pipe, Vicki (2018). The Railway Adventures: Places, Trains, People and Stations. September Publishing. ISBN 978-1910463871.
