= Eastgate, County Durham =

Coordinates: 54.745°N 2.077°W

Eastgate
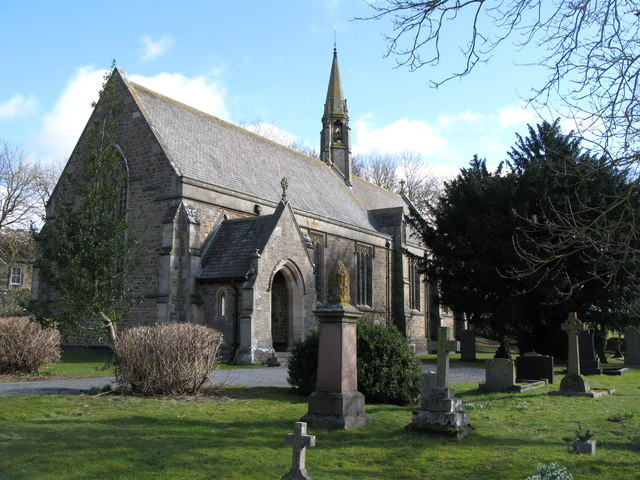

- Location within County Durham
- Population: 163 (2001 census)
- OS grid reference: NY951389
- Civil parish: Stanhope
- Unitary authority: County Durham
- Ceremonial county: Durham
- Region: North East
- Country: England
- Sovereign state: United Kingdom
- Post town: Bishop Auckland
- Postcode district: DL13
- Police: Durham
- Fire: County Durham and Darlington
- Ambulance: North East
- UK Parliament: North West Durham

Eastgate is a village in the civil parish of Stanhope, in County Durham, England. It is situated in Weardale, a few miles west of Stanhope. In the 2001 census Eastgate had a population of 163.

Eastgate originally marked the eastern border of the private hunting park of the Prince Bishops of Durham. This was second in extent only to the royal hunting park of the New Forest in Hampshire. In 1540, John Leland described the Bishop of Durham's deer park in Weardale as 'rudely enclosed with stone of a 12 or 14 miles in compass near Westgate and Eastgate'.

To the west of Eastgate are a number of medieval sites. A suspected hunting lodge near Round Hill (Cambokeels) and a settlement site at Westerhopeburn. The latter is described as a hunting lodge or shielding and may be connected to the “Westirhirstshele” mentioned in Robert Strangeway's lease of the park in 1419 (described in the Calendar of Rolls of Bishop Booth). It was in use during the period when Strangeways and later his son held the grazing rights in the park. It may have been abandoned around 1458 when the lease was split up.

The hunting lodge and supposed chapel at Cambokeels may also have been part of the Strangeway’s estate. Excavations suggest a five-roomed building with pottery and coin evidence suggesting occupation between 1430-1460, and later pottery indicating secondary occupation into the 16th century. It was suggested that the site was a hunting lodge of the Bishops of Durham.

A Wesleyan Methodist chapel was built in 1826 and became a schoolroom when the present chapel was built in 1891.

The Anglican parish church of All Saints was built in 1888 by J.R.W Hildyard of Horsley Hall. A chapel of ease was also listed on various 19th century ordnance survey maps (just to the west of the current church) and was certainly active in 1828.

The Cross Keys public house was built early to late 18th century.

William Emerson, the mathematician, had an estate near Eastgate where he would repair to work throughout the summer on projects as disparate as stonemasonry and watchmaking.

Emerson Muschamp Bainbridge, the founder of the world's first department store, was born in the village.

== Geothermal plant ==
In 2004 it was announced that a hot geothermal power plant would go ahead on the site of a former cement works. The geothermal plant was planned to heat the UK's first geothermal energy model village, the official working title being Eastgate Renewable Energy Village. But the plan fell through, and instead of the village a large outdoor set was built for the filming of the ITV series Beowulf: Return to the Shieldlands, first broadcast in 2016.

The exploratory geothermal borehole drilled in December 2004 was the first to be completed in the United Kingdom for more than 20 years. The water temperature at a depth of 995 metres (3,264 ft) was found to be 46.2 °C, and it was estimated that the water temperature of a production borehole with a depth of about 1,800 metres (5,900 ft) would be in the range of 75–80 °C, with a volume of water similar to that already being exploited in the existing geothermal energy scheme in Southampton.

== Weardale Railway ==
The plans for the energy village included constructing a terminus for the Weardale Railway, which currently runs between Bishop Auckland and Stanhope

== See also ==
- Geothermal power in the United Kingdom

== Sources ==
- Smailes, AE (1960). North England. Edinburgh: Thomas Nelson & Sons Ltd.
