= St John's Chapel railway station =

Disused railway station in St John's Chapel, County Durham

St John's Chapel
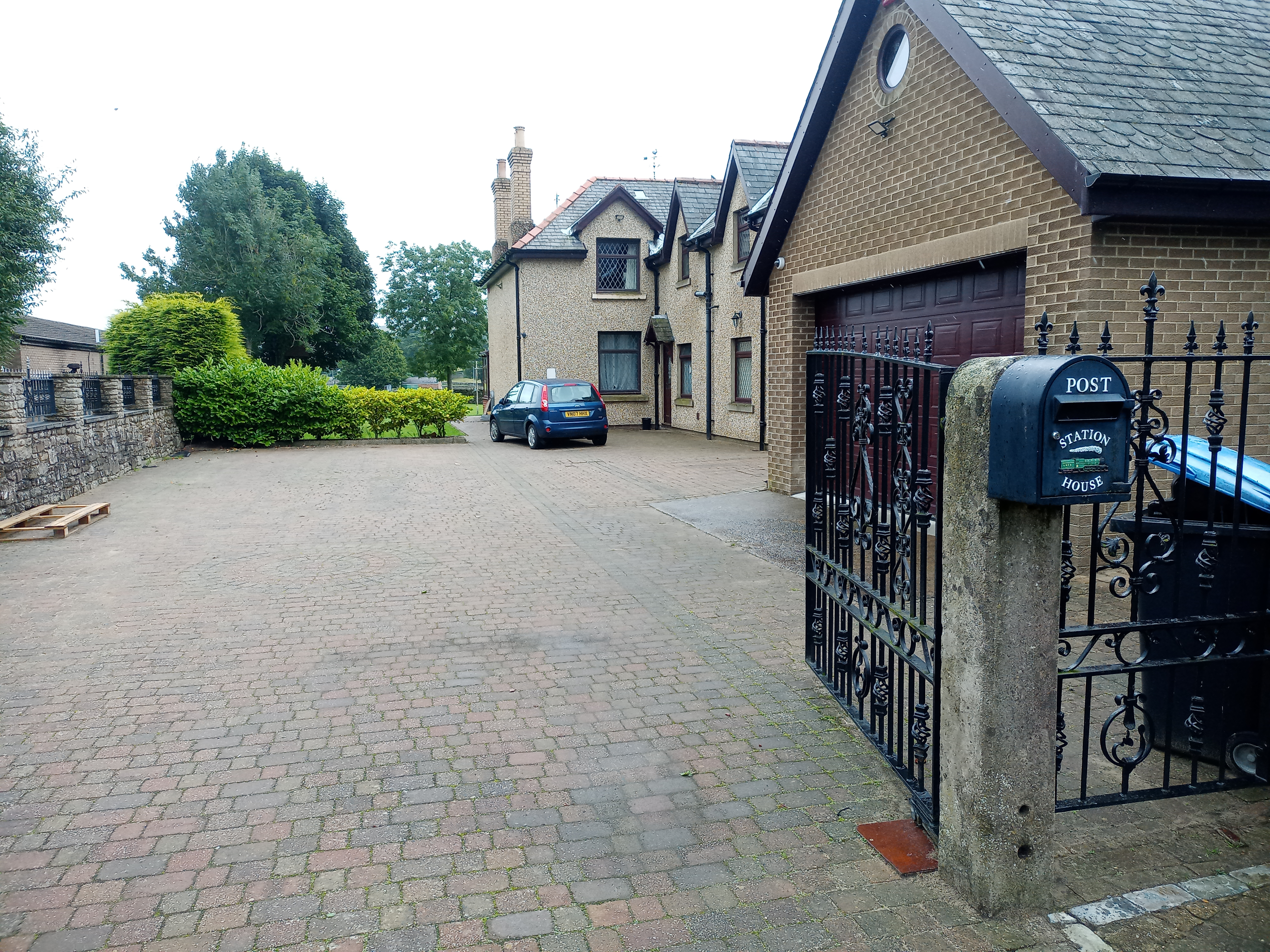

General information
- Location: St John's Chapel, County Durham; England
- Coordinates: 54.7373°N 2.1769°W
- Grid reference: NY887380
- Platforms: 1

Other information
- Status: Disused

History
- Original company: North Eastern Railway
- Pre-grouping: North Eastern Railway
- Post-grouping: LNER; British Railways (North Eastern Region)

Key dates
- 21 October 1895: Opened
- 29 June 1953: Closed to passengers
- 1 November 1965: Closed to goods
Location

St John's Chapel railway station served the village of St John's Chapel, County Durham, England, from 1895 to 1965 on the Weardale Railway.

== History ==
The station opened on 21 October 1895 by the North Eastern Railway. It was situated on the south side of a minor road and included a goods warehouse and several sidings. The station closed to passengers on 29 June 1953. It became a public delivery siding on 2 January 1961 and closed to goods on 1 November 1965. The track was removed in September 1966. John Tom Rumney (Station Master/porter) and his wife Meggie Rumney continued to live in Station House next to the demolished station where they raised their sons Ronnie and Maurice Rumney. The house was sold after Meggie's death and extended.

Preceding station	Historical railways	Following station
Wearhead; Line and station closed	Weardale Railway	Westgate-in-Weardale; Line and station closed
