= Stanhope railway station =

Railway station in Stanhope, County Durham, England

Stanhope
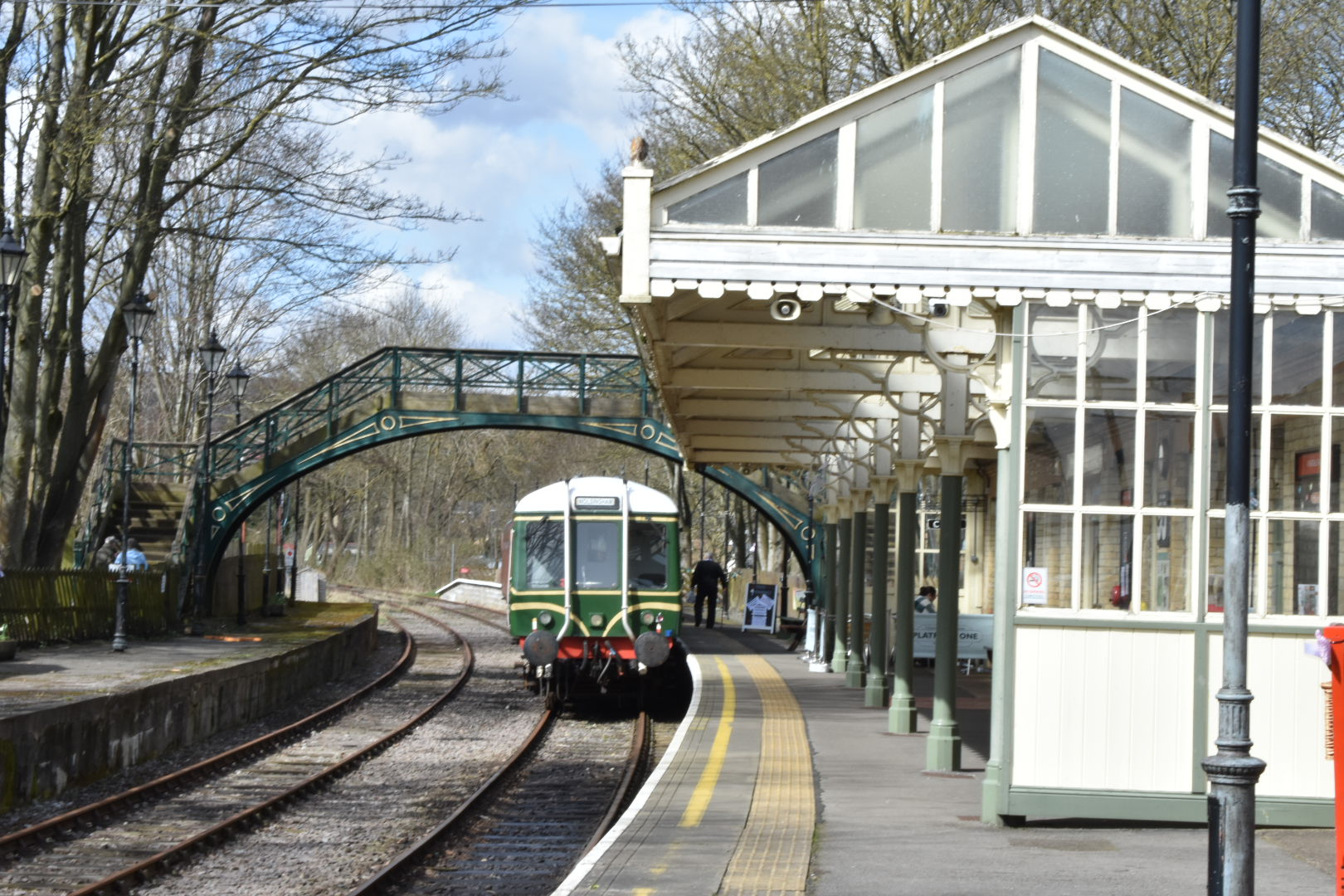

General information
- Location: Stanhope, County Durham; England
- System: Station on heritage railway
- Manager: Weardale Railway
- Platforms: 2

History
- Original company: Frosterly and Stanhope Railway
- Pre-grouping: North Eastern Railway
- Post-grouping: London and North Eastern Railway

Key dates
- 1862: Opened
- 21 October 1895: Resited
- 29 June 1953: Closed to Passengers
- 1965: Closed to goods
- 1988: Reopened for a temporary summer service
- 1992: Closed along with the rest of the line
- 2004: Opened as part of the Weardale Railway
Location

Stanhope is a railway station on the Weardale Railway, and serves the town of Stanhope in Weardale, England. The station is served by regular services on selected days throughout the year, mainly during weekends. The station is currently the terminus of the line as the section from here to Eastgate is out of use. The station is situated 16 miles (26 km) from Bishop Auckland.

== History ==
The railway first reached Stanhope in 1834 as part of the Stanhope and Tyne Railway, but this line did not carry passengers and was cable hauled by stationary engines up the valley sides.

The station first opened in 1862, as the Frosterly and Stanhope Railway extended to reach the Newlandsides estate, an area where vast amounts of limestone were known to occur. However, the original station lasted for just over thirty years when it was rebuilt as the line extended to Wearhead, and it was impossible to extend from the original station. The original station became the goods shed, and is still in existence. Across the River Wear there was an engine shed where Locomotion No. 1 and Derwent were sent for safekeeping during the Second World War. The original wooden footbridge was replaced by a typical North Eastern Railway footbridge in 1920. The station closed to passengers in 1953 and to freight in 1965. The line from Wearhead to St John's Chapel closed to freight in 1961, and the line was subsequently closed from there to Eastgate in 1968. However freight trains continued to serve Eastgate cement works up until 1992. After closure the station deteriorated and the canopy was removed. The station was purchased by Wear Valley Council who carried out some structural repairs.

In 1988 an experimental summer service was trialled on the line and the station was reopened. Before this the station received a £9,000 investment to prepare it for passengers. This service was repeated until 1992 when the line was closed completely. The line was then mothballed until 2004 when the station reopened as part of the heritage line. A replica canopy was later installed, as well as the waiting room on platform two being refurbished. The station is the current headquarters and operating base of the line, hosting the Weardale Railway Trust's shop and a cafe. The station has free parking on days when trains are running.

== Services ==
The line is served throughout the line with services terminating at either Bishop Auckland West or Wolsingham. On days where the line is served through to Bishop Auckland only two services are run, whereas when the line only runs as far as Wolsingham, three trains operate. Occasional special services are run throughout the year, and are based at Stanhope Station such as afternoon tea trains and photography specials. Services are normally operated with first or second generation multiple units.

Preceding station	Heritage railways	Following station
Terminus	Weardale Railway	Frosterley towards Bishop Auckland
Proposed extension
Eastgate Terminus	Weardale Railway	Frosterley towards Bishop Auckland
Historical railways
Eastgate; Line mothballed, station closed	North Eastern Railway; Frosterley and Stanhope Railway	Frosterley; Line open, station open
