= British Rail Class 122 =

Class of single-car diesel multiple units

British Rail Class 122 Bubble Car
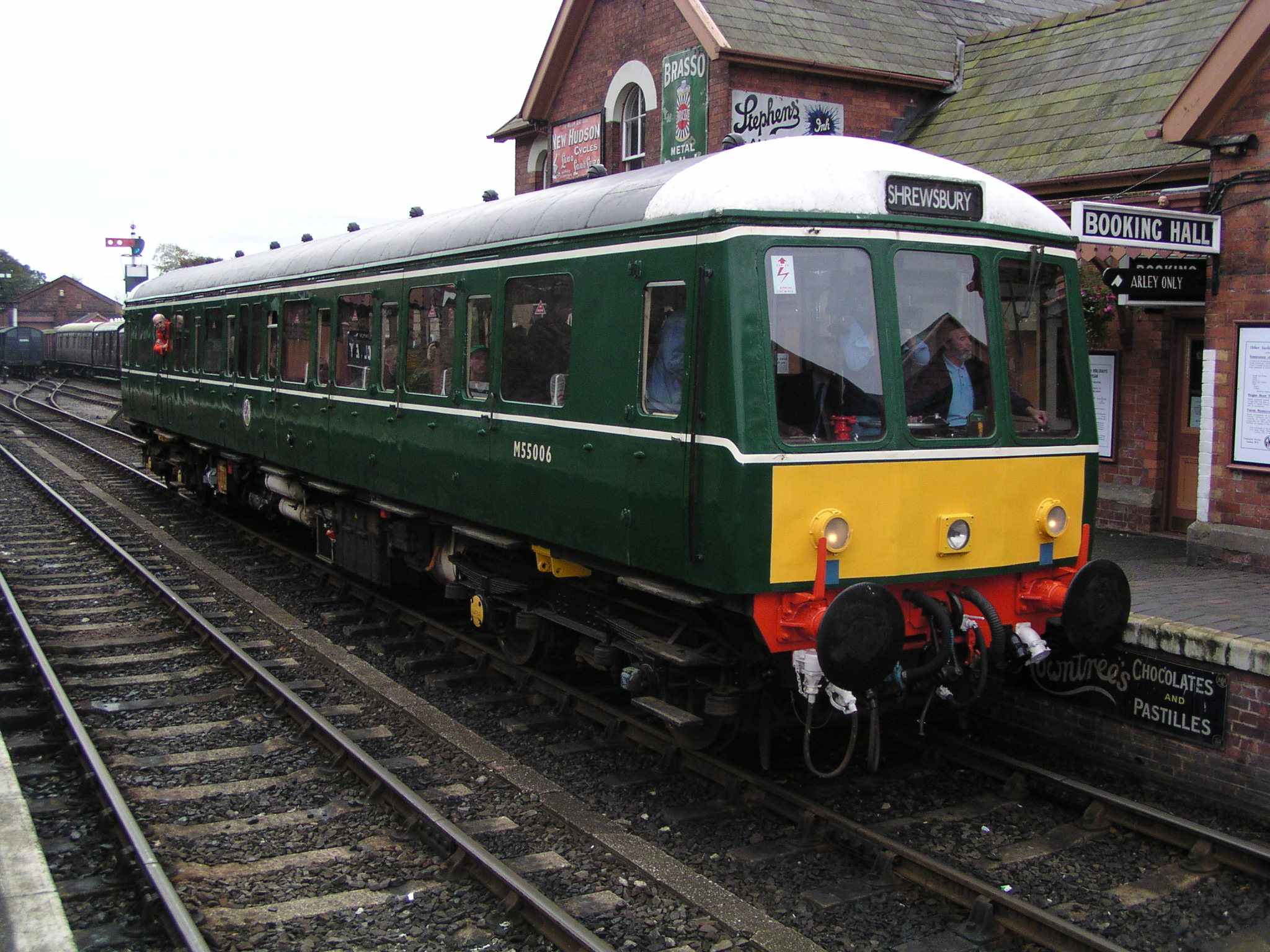
- Class 122, no. 55006, at Bewdley on the Severn Valley Railway 2004, whilst taking part in the Railcar 50 event. This unit is painted in the second version of BR Green livery, and is preserved on the Ecclesbourne Valley Railway.

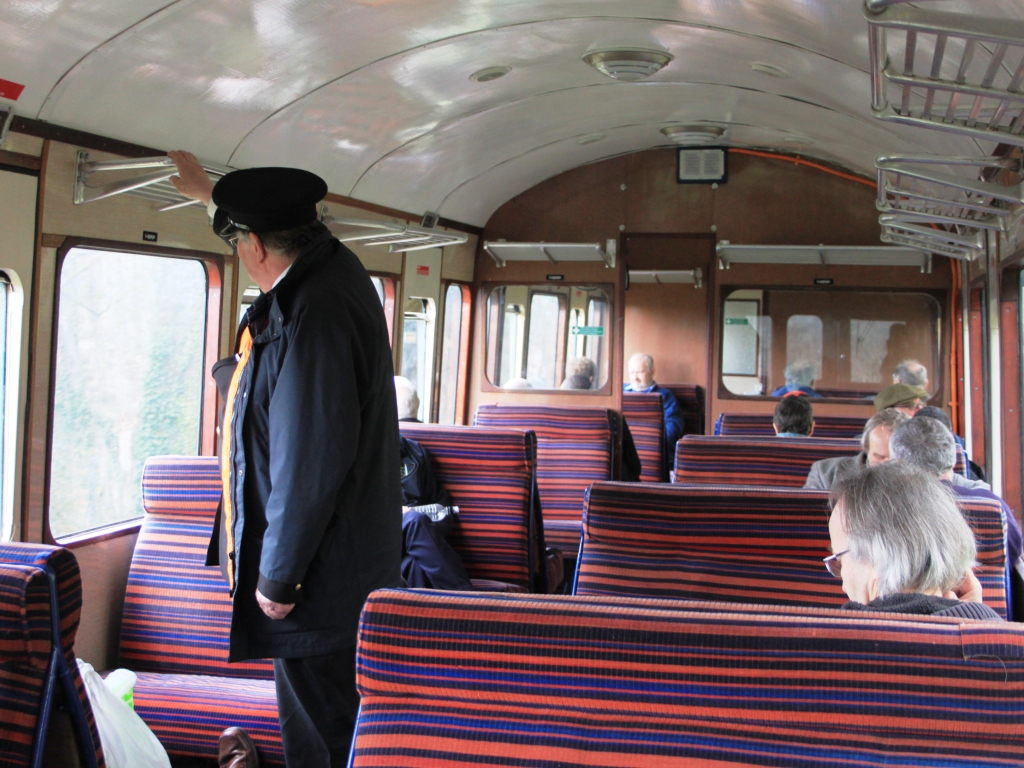
- Interior of W55000 on the South Devon Railway
- In service: 1958–1995
- Manufacturer: Gloucester RC&W
- Family name: First generation
- Replaced: Steam locomotives and carriages
- Number built: 20 motor, 9 trailer
- Number preserved: DMBS: 8
- Formation: Single car
- Diagram: DMBS: 539; DTS: 538
- Fleet numbers: DMBS: 55000–55019; DTS: 56291–56299
- Capacity: DMBS: 65; DTS: 95
- Operator: British Rail
- Depots: BY Bletchley; DE Dundee; ED Eastfield; HA Haymarket; HN Hamilton; IS Inverness; LA Laira; RG Reading; TS Tyseley
- Lines served: Aylesbury–Princes Risborough; Liskeard - Looe; Lostwithiel - Fowey; Okehampton–Bude; Par - Newquay; St Erth - St Ives

Specifications
- Car body construction: Steel
- Car length: 64 ft 0 1/2 in (19.52 m)
- Width: 9 ft 3 in (2.82 m)
- Height: 12 ft 8 1/8 in (3.86 m)
- Doors: Slam
- Articulated sections: Single car (2)
- Maximum speed: 70 mph (113 km/h)
- Weight: DMBS: 36 long tons (81,000 lb; 37 t); DTS: 29 long tons (65,000 lb; 29 t)
- Prime mover: Two BUT (AEC) then BUT (Leyland) of 150 hp (110 kW) (both types)
- Power output: 300 hp (220 kW)
- Transmission: Standard mechanical
- Safety system: AWS
- Multiple working: ■ Blue Square
- Track gauge: 4 ft 8 1/2 in (1,435 mm)

The British Rail Class 122 diesel mechanical multiple units were built by Gloucester RC&W in 1958. Twenty single-car, double-ended driving motor vehicles, nicknamed "Bubble Cars", were built, numbered 55000–55019. These were supplemented by nine single-ended trailer vehicles, numbered 56291–56299 (some of which were later renumbered into the 54291–54299 block).

== Operation ==
The Class 122s were built for use on the Western Region of British Railways, the initial allocations being: 81D Reading – three DMBS; 81C Southall – nine DMBS and six DTS; 84E Tyseley – eight DMBS and three DTS. Eleven DMBS and five DTS that were allocated to Tyseley depot passed to the London Midland Region when the regional boundaries were changed in 1963; some were subsequently also used in Scotland. They were used on a variety of lightly used lines, many of which were closed during the Beeching Axe in the 1960s including the ex-LSWR lines in West Devon and North Cornwall.

During the 1990s, refurbished Class 122 units were used on the Cornish branches between Liskeard and Looe and St Erth and St Ives.

== Parcels conversion ==
In 1968, three cars (55013–55015) were converted for use on the Scottish Region to carry parcels traffic and were reclassified Class 131, though the vehicles themselves were not renumbered. The converted vehicles were given the TOPS classification DXV.

== Preservation ==
| Vehicle no. | | Unit no. | Vehicle type | Location | Livery | Comments |
| Original no. | Departmental no. | Unit no. | Vehicle type | Location | Livery | Comments |
|---|---|---|---|---|---|---|
| 55006 | - | P106 | DMBS | Ecclesbourne Valley Railway | BR Green | Collided with the buffers at the Stourbridge Town terminus of the Stourbridge Town branch line on 21 April 1989 after the driver was distracted by trespassers. |
| 55012 | 977941 | | DMBS | Weardale Railway | BR Green | Joined the fleet on a permanent basis in December 2013 after visiting for contract repairs Took part in Railcar 50 in 2004. Required a modification back to single car unit after this D.M.B.S collided into the Stourbridge Town station buffer on 2 April 1977. |

== Models ==
Dapol has released models of the Class 122 railcar in both O gauge and OO gauge in a variety of liveries.

In 2012, Dapol introduced a British N gauge model of the Class 122 in both BR blue and BR blue and grey liveries.

In 2025, Heljan announced they would release a TT scale model of the Class 122 in various liveries, due for release in 2026.
