= Wearhead railway station =

Disused railway station in Wearhead, County Durham

Wearhead
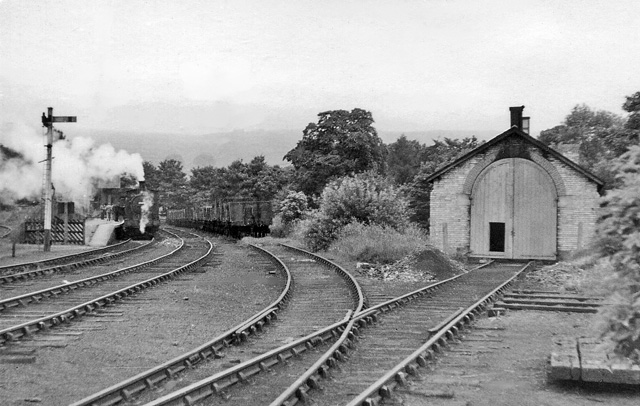
- The station in 1953

General information
- Location: Wearhead, County Durham; England
- Coordinates: 54.7494°N 2.2189°W
- Grid reference: NY860394
- Platforms: 1

Other information
- Status: Disused

History
- Original company: North Eastern Railway
- Pre-grouping: North Eastern Railway
- Post-grouping: LNER; British Railways (North Eastern Region)

Key dates
- 21 October 1895: Opened
- 29 June 1953: Closed to passengers
- 2 January 1963: Closed to goods
Location

Wearhead railway station served the village of Wearhead, County Durham, England, from 1895 to 1961 on the Weardale Railway.

== History ==
The station opened on 21 October 1895 by the North Eastern Railway. It was situated on the north side of Front Street on the A689. It had a signal box, a goods warehouse and a single road engine shed, situated to the southeast. The station closed to passengers on 29 June 1953 and closed to goods on 2 January 1961. The road at the engine shed was lifted shortly after and the shed was demolished after 1977. The platform and the station building still exist, in use as a private residence.

Preceding station	Historical railways	Following station
Terminus	Weardale Railway	St John's Chapel; Line and station closed
