= Northman of Escomb =

10th-century English earl

Northman (Old English: Norþman; fl. 994) was a late 10th-century English earl, with a territorial base in Northumbria north of the River Tees. A figure with this name appears in two different strands of source material. These are, namely, a textual tradition from Durham witnessed by Historia de Sancto Cuthberto and by the Durham Liber Vitae; and the other an appearance in a witness list of a charter of King Æthelred II dated to 994. The latter is Northman's only appearance south of the Humber, and occurred the year after Northumbria was attacked by Vikings.

Almost nothing is known about Northman besides his title and status as a landowner and ecclesiastical donor in northern Northumbia, our ignorance extending to the identities of his parents and any children or spouses he may have had. Northman is never given a patronymic, and although he is associated with landholdings in what would later become County Durham there is no explicit statement about the geography of any "earldom" he held. There is a possibility therefore that the two appearances of Northman represent different characters, though they are generally thought to be the same.

== Durham Northman ==
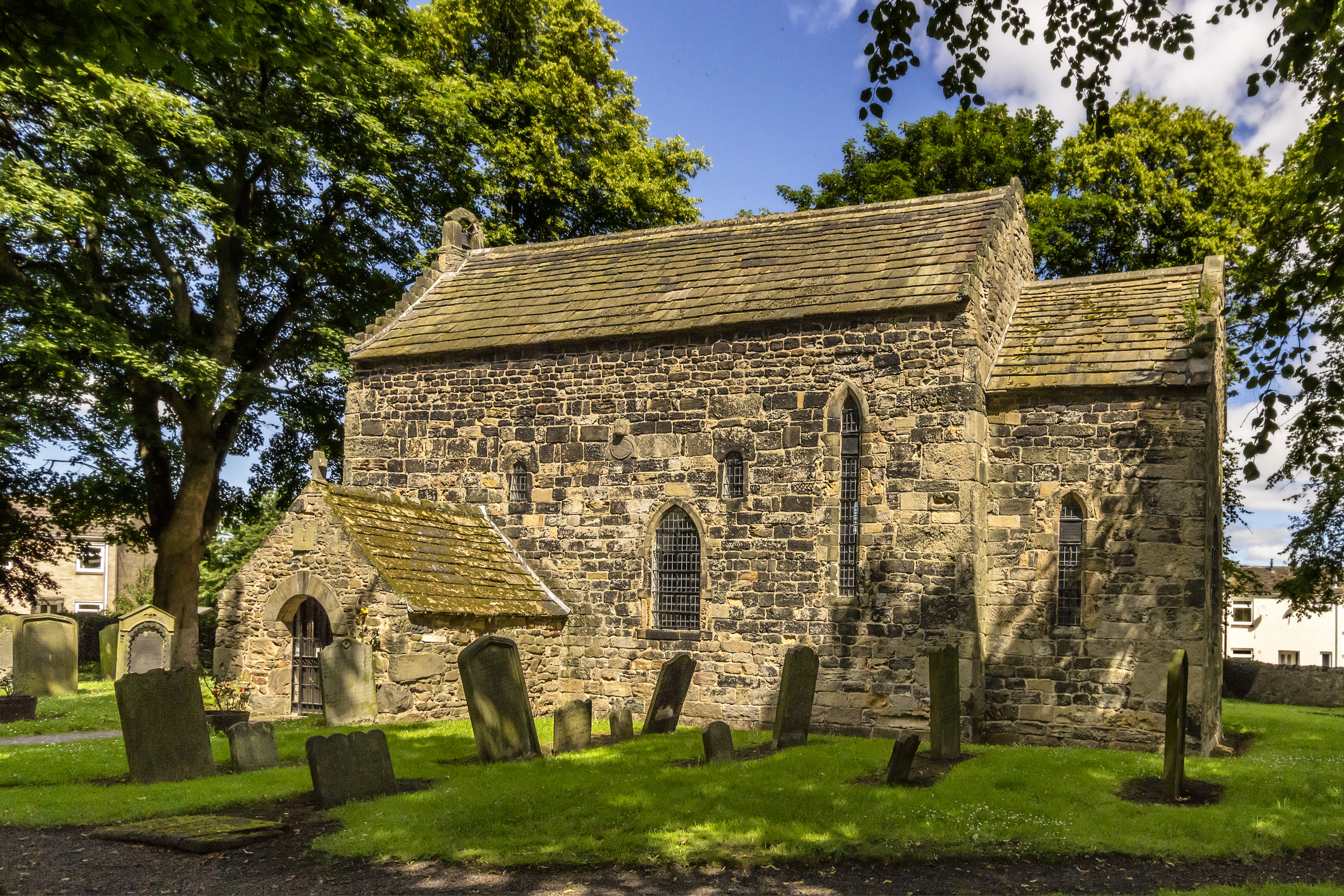
Escomb Church, constructed in the 8th or 9th century.

The first witness to Northman's existence (and importance) is provided by textual tradition preserved in Durham, reproduced by two related sources. The former of these is the grant — one of three grants written into a blank leaf at the end of the original volume of the Durham Liber Vitae — ascribed to Earl Northman (the other two to Earl Ulfketil and Earl Thored). Northman's grant is in folio 33^{v}, and is thought to date to the late 10th or early 11th century. It records that Northman gave Escomb (on the River Wear between Witton-le-Wear and Bishop Auckland) to the community of St Cuthbert.

This grant appears to have been used as a source for the Historia de Sancto Cuthberto ("History of St Cuthbert") § 31, which probably made use of several such charters when it was written. The text purports to record a "lease" by Bishop Aldhun, bishop of St Cuthbert (c. 990 – c. 1018), to three different earls:

These are the lands which Bishop Aldhun [990–1018] and the whole congregation of St Cuthbert presented to these three, Earl Ethred, Earl Northman and Earl Uhtred: Gainford, Whorlton, Sledwich, Barforth, Startforth, Lartington, Marwood Green, Stainton, Streatlam, Cleatlam, Langton, Morton Tinmouth, Piercebridge, Bishop Auckland and West Auckland, Copeland, Weardseatle, Binchester, Cuthbertestun, Thickley, Escombe, Witton-le-Wear, Hunwick, Newton Cap, Helme Park. Whoever seizes from St Cuthbert any part of these, may he perish on the Day of Judgment.

Weardseatle and Cuthbertestun are unidentified, though the historian Ted South thought Weardseatle might be St Andrew Auckland. This list is in fact two blocks of estates, one centred on Gainford around the River Tees and the other around Bishop Auckland on the River Wear.

== Wilton Northman ==
A Norþman dux, "Earl Northman" or "Ealdorman Northman", witnessed a charter dating to 994 by King Æthelred II ("the Unready"). The charter is a grant of 10 hides at Fovant, Wiltshire, to the church of St Mary, Wilton. He is one of seven duces (earls or ealdormen) witnessing the charter, and appears sixth in order, ahead of one Wælðeof dux, Waltheof of Bamburgh.

If these identifications are correct, and given that Ælfhelm ealdorman of southern Northumbria appears in the same charter, it is unclear what arrangement allowed both Waltheof and Northman to hold the status of dux in northern Northumbria at the same time. Northumbria in this period was only supposed to have had two figures of such status, though this depends tradition about the legacy of kings Eadred and Edgar the Peaceable not attested until the 12th century. In that tradition there were separate 'earls' for Northumbria north and south of the Tees.

Alex Woolf noted that the previous year, 993, the Anglo-Saxon Chronicle related that Scandinavians (apparently led by Óláfr Tryggvason) had invaded Northumbria and sacked Bamburgh, whereupon the southern English raised an army:

(s.a. 993) In this year Bamburgh was sacked and much booty was captured there, and after that the army came to the mouth of the Humber and did great damage there, both in Lindsey and in Northumbria. Then a very large English army was collected, and when they should have joined battle, the leaders Fræna, Godwine and Frythegyst, first started the flight.

Woolf thought that both Northman and Waltheof were in the south for this reason. The Anglo-Saxon Chronicle reported that, in 994, the year of this charter and the year following the attack on Northumbria, Óláfr Tryggvason and Sveinn Forkbeard attacked London and southern England.

It is not known when or how Northman died, nor who succeeded him directly. Nor can a relationship with any other Northumbrian earl be established, though if there is any accuracy or chronological order to the lease notice in the Historia de Sancto Cuthberto, he lived until at least the beginning of Aldhun's episcopate, and was followed by Uhtred of Bamburgh.
