= Gaunless Bridge =

Bridge in County Durham, England

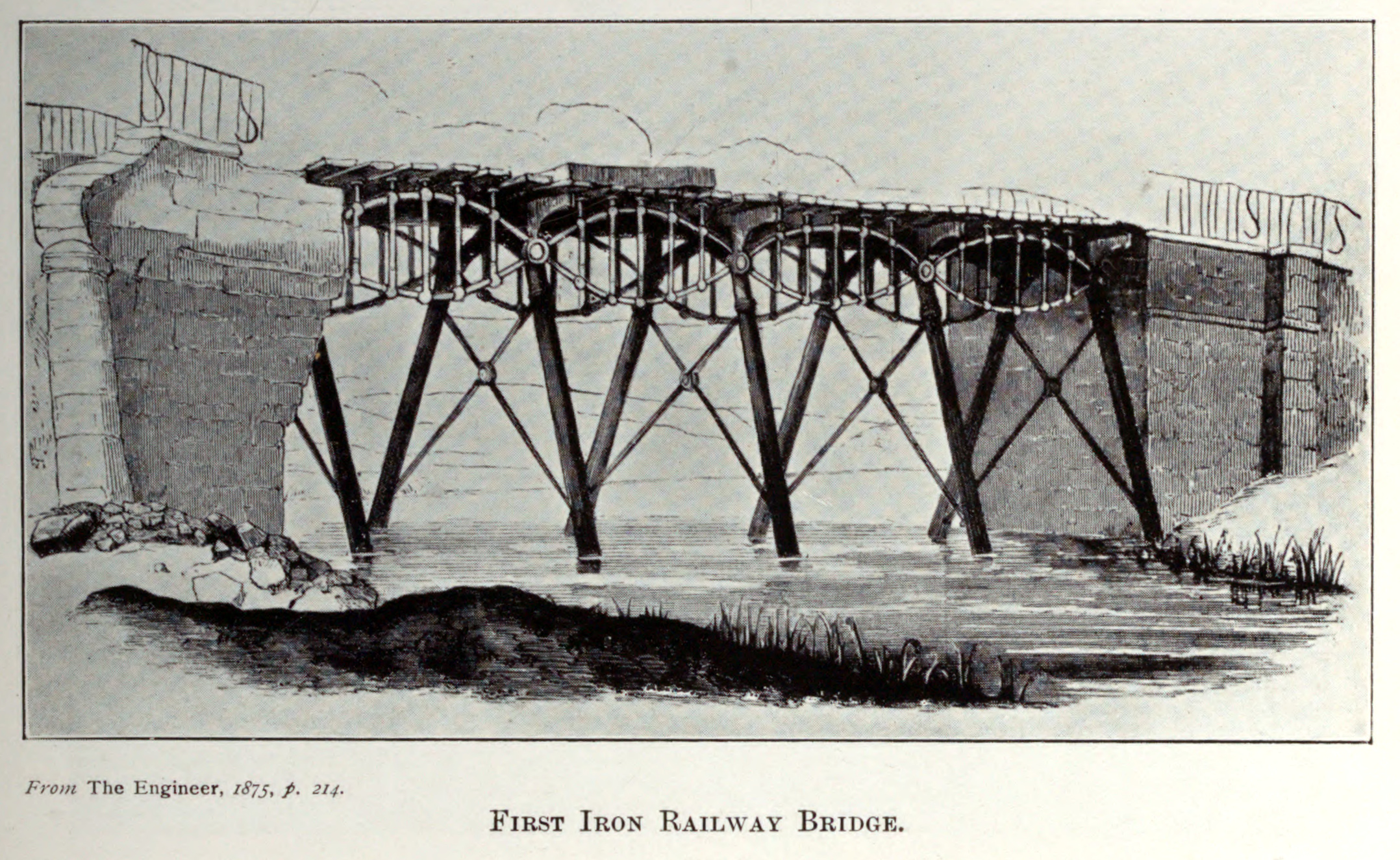
- Engraving published in The Engineer (1875)
- Coordinates: 54.633203°N 1.712808°W
- Carries: Witton Park branch of the Stockton and Darlington Railway, a horse-drawn mineral railway
- Crosses: River Gaunless

Characteristics
- Design: lenticular truss
- Material: Wrought- and cast-iron
- Total length: 50 feet (20 m)
- Longest span: 12 feet 5 inches (3.78 m)
- No. of spans: three, later four

History
- Designer: George Stephenson
- Fabrication by: John & Isaac Burrell
- Opened: 1823

Location
- Interactive map of Gaunless Bridge

Gaunless Bridge was a railway bridge on the Stockton and Darlington Railway. It was completed in 1823 and is one of the first railway bridges to be constructed of iron and the first to use an iron truss. It is also of an unusual lenticular truss design.

== Location ==
The bridge crosses the River Gaunless at West Auckland, Co. Durham.

Although never part of the main line, it was on a branch West of Shildon serving Witton Park Colliery. This branch included two rope-worked inclines at Brusselton and Etherley. Between these, wagons were pulled by horses, rather than the heavier locomotives. The bridge was only required to carry the weight of these horse-worked trains. Despite this, a postcard exists showing a locomotive of the 'Director' class on the bridge, possibly during a test or demonstration. (Note: The original loco-on-Gaunless-Bridge painting was executed by the British artist John Wigston (born 1939). The painting can be seen here. We do not yet have evidence that Stockton & Darlington railway engine no.23 Wilberforce ever crossed the Gaunless Bridge.)

== Design ==
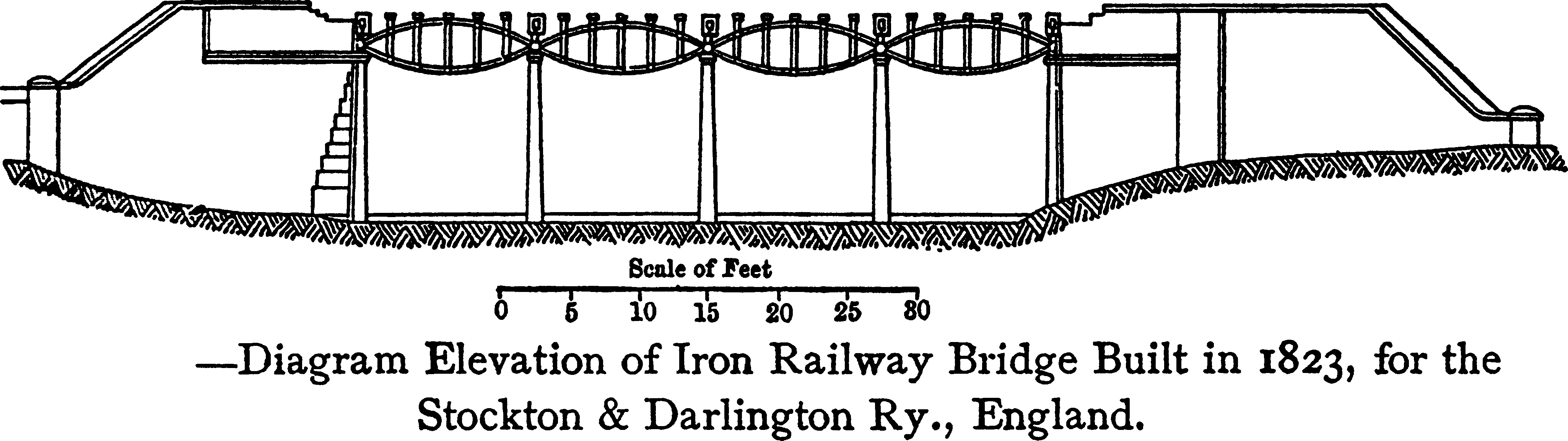
Stephenson's design, 1823

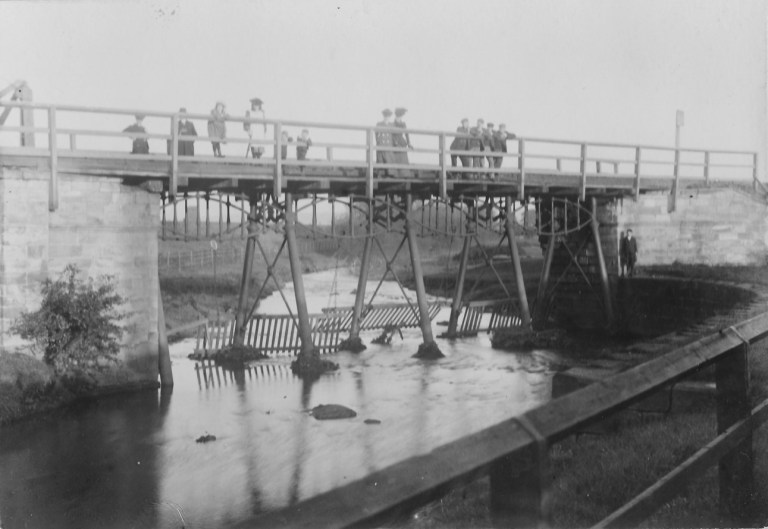
Gaunless Bridge, before 1901

It was designed in 1823 by George Stephenson, who was the chief engineer of the railway.

As well as being one of the first iron railway bridges, the bridge is the first to use the lenticular truss design. This design uses two curved girders in a lens shape, one above and one below. The upper member is in compression, as for an arch bridge, and the lower in tension, as for a suspension bridge. The idea is that this forms a balanced truss, where the sideways forces in each member cancel out, being equal but opposite in direction. This leads to a truss with no side forces on its supports and so only requiring simple piers with no need for endways stiffness. Vertical members connect the two girders and support the load-carrying deck of the bridge. These vertical members must also transfer some load between the two girders, as to maintain their lens shape. An efficient truss distributes the load of the deck between the two girders, rather than placing the majority of the load on one truss member, and so requiring it to be excessively strong compared to the other.

The lenticular truss design has been used for other bridges since, but has never gained popularity in use. Brunel later made use of this truss, as the Brunel truss used at Chepstow and Saltash. The Gaunless Bridge is particularly unusual, as its wooden deck is installed above the truss girders; whereas in most lenticular trusses, the deck is hung beneath the trusses on rods or cables.

Although not as sceptical or rigorously investigative as Brunel, Stephenson had a deep understanding of the different strengths of wrought- and cast-iron. Both girders are formed of wrought iron tubes, 2.4 inches (6 cm) in diameter. The unusual feature of this bridge is that because the deck is above the truss, the vertical members are placed in compression, rather than the more normal tension. This allowed Stephenson to use cast iron for the vertical members, rather than the more expensive wrought iron needed for bridges in tension. (Note: Cast iron is strong in compression, but weak in tension or against bending. Wrought iron is strong for both.) The truss achieves an efficient symmetry of the load distribution between the two members, giving an economical and balanced appearance that is in great contrast to Brunel's heavily unbalanced designs that (for Chepstow at least) are barely recognisable as lenticular.

Each span is 12 feet 5 inches (3.78 m) wide and 5 feet (1.5 m) deep. The piers supporting the truss spans form a trestle comprising two inward-leaning cast iron tubular pillars. The pillars are braced apart by a cast iron X-frame. These pillars are 8 inches (200 mm) in diameter with 1.4 inches (35 mm) thick walls, They are 10 feet (3.0 m) apart at the base, sloping in to 5 feet (1.5 m) at their top.

The bridge was originally built with three spans, but was later extended to four spans, to allow more space for floodwater. Unusually, the bridge has five metal piers for its four spans, with the weight of the ends of the outer spans resting on iron pillars, rather than on the adjoining stone abutments. These additional pillars make the bridge spans self-supporting, even in the absence of the stone abutments. This may have been a factor in the bridge's preservation off-site and re-display in railway museums since, as it is relatively easy to re-erect the bridge without needing expensive foundations.

== History ==
The original three span bridge was fabricated by John & Isaac Burrell of Orchard Street, Newcastle, adjacent to Stephenson's own works at Forth Street. Its erection was completed on 23 October 1823,

The winter of 1824 had heavy snows and even before the line was opened, the bridge was damaged by flooding. It was rebuilt to its later four span form in 1825, in time for the opening of the line in September.

Passenger services were introduced on line from 1833, and steam locomotives across the bridge soon afterwards.

A presentation model of the Gaunless Bridge was made for the North Eastern Railway in 1875 to mark the 50th anniversary of the opening of the Stockton and Darlington Railway. It may be seen today in the Science Museum, London.

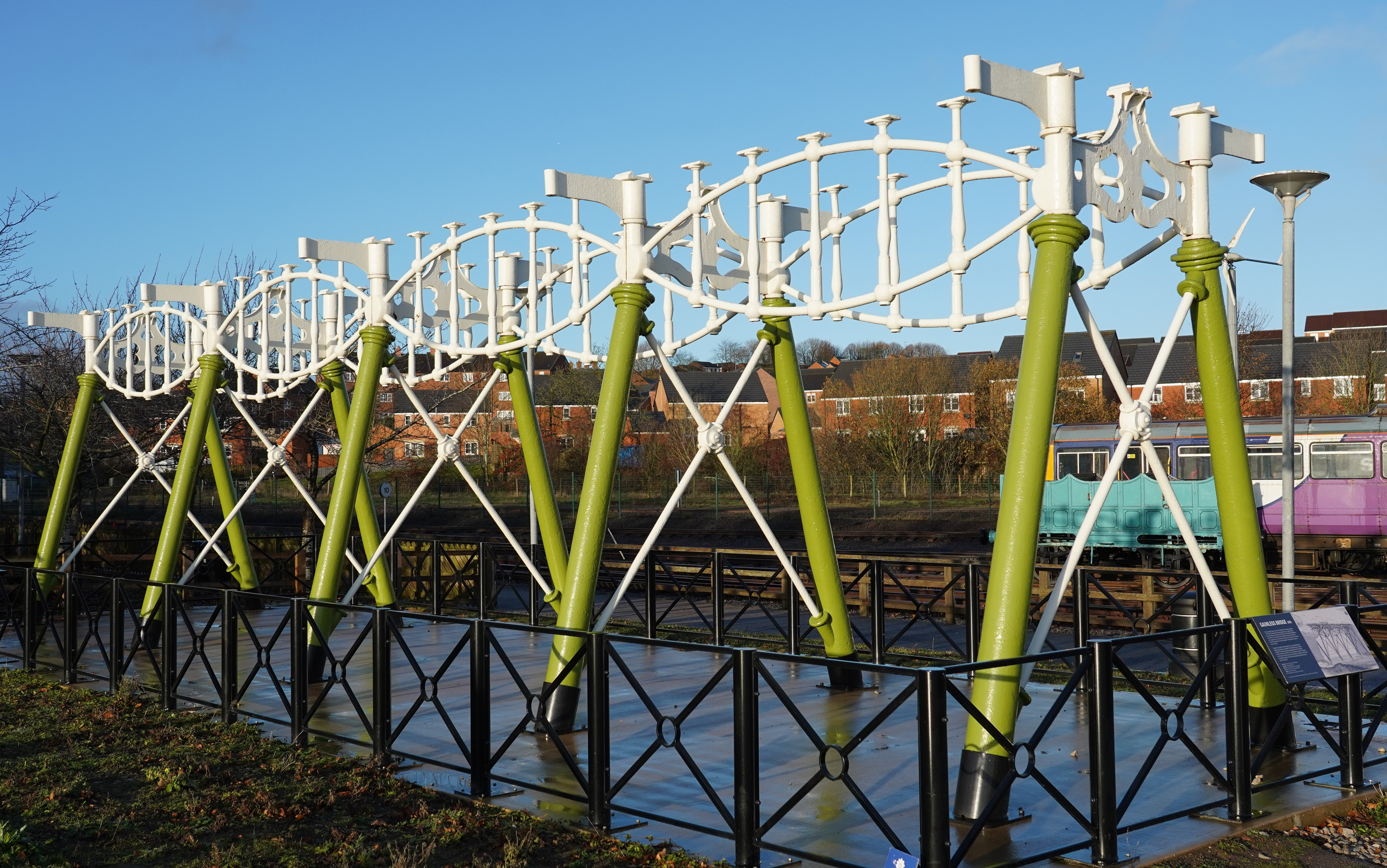
Part of the bridge on display at Locomotion Museum in Shildon

=== Removal and preservation ===
By 1901 the bridge was overloaded by the increasing weight of coal wagons. It was dismantled and removed, but kept in storage at Brusselton Colliery. The original stone abutments were kept, although with recesses cut into them to accept new plate girders. When the York Railway Museum was opened at Queen Street in 1927, the bridge was re-assembled in commemoration of the centenary of the S&DR. From 1975, it was on display in the car park of the National Railway Museum, York, for many years carrying a coal wagon of the original chaldron style. (Note: Bridge's location on display today: 53°57′39″N 1°05′50″W) The bridge has now spent longer on display as a museum artefact than it did in service as a bridge. In 2023 the bridge was again dismantled and re-erected at the Locomotion Museum, Shildon, where it is much closer to its original location.

In February 2023 Historic England awarded Durham County Council £161,000 to repair the abutments, which remained in situ when the original bridge was deconstructed. The repair works will add a new bridge deck intended to join the bridge into a wider Stockton and Darlington Railway Walking and Cycling route.

== Comparable bridges ==
=== Escomb Bridge ===
The lenticular truss was never a common design and Stephenson's compression truss beneath the deck even rarer. A still-extant near-contemporary example is only a couple of miles North of Gaunless Bridge. This was built in 1842 as a skewed accommodation footbridge across the Bishop Auckland and Weardale Railway near Escomb. (Note: Escomb Bridge: 54.661361°N 1.705424°W) Today it carries a bridleway. The bridge comprises a single span pair of lenticular girders, although in this example both girders and verticals are of wrought iron. The upper member is a rolled H girder, the lower chain of forged bar chain links.

Escomb bridge is Grade II listed and was refurbished in 2009, with its wooden parapet being raised for modern safety standards.

== See also ==
- Pont-y-Cafnau, an earlier iron bridge of 1793, although built for a wagonway rather than a railway
