= West Auckland railway station =

Disused railway station in County Durham, England

West Auckland

General information
- Location: St Helen Auckland, County Durham; England
- Coordinates: 54.6346°N 1.7141°W
- Grid reference: NZ185266
- Platforms: 2

Other information
- Status: Disused

History
- Original company: Stockton and Darlington Railway
- Pre-grouping: North Eastern Railway
- Post-grouping: London and North Eastern Railway

Key dates
- 1 December 1833: Station opened as St Helens
- 1 March 1878: Renamed West Auckland
- 18 June 1962: Station closed
Location

West Auckland railway station served the villages of St Helen Auckland and West Auckland in County Durham, England, between 1833 and 1962. It was on the railway line between Bishop Auckland and Barnard Castle. There was a locomotive depot, which was the only one to be both closed completely and later reopened by the London and North Eastern Railway.

== History ==
The Stockton and Darlington Railway (S&DR), which was authorised in 1821, was formally opened on 27 September 1825. The original main line connected Witton Park Colliery with Stockton, and ran close to the village of West Auckland. On 1 October 1830, a branch line was opened from West Auckland to Hagger Leases Lane, commencing at a point described both as St Helens Auckland and as West Auckland, those being villages on either side of the railway. The early policy of the S&DR was to permit anybody who possessed a suitable coach or wagon to run it upon the railway themselves, upon payment of a toll or fee to the S&DR. The S&DR later decided to buy out the coach operators, and operate the passenger trains themselves: these began on 1 October 1833 between Stockton and Darlington; they were extended to Shildon and West Auckland on 1 December 1833: the station there was originally named St Helens.

The original route between Shildon and St Helens Auckland ran over the Brusselton Incline, where a winding engine was installed to haul wagons up the steep gradients on each side. In January 1842, the first section of the Bishop Auckland and Weardale Railway, from a junction with the S&DR near Shildon and including the 1,225-yard (1,120 m) Shildon Tunnel, opened as far as South Church (it was extended to Crook in 1843). A connecting spur from the north end of Shildon Tunnel allowing trains from St Helens Auckland to reach Shildon without using the Brusselton incline was authorised on 4 July 1854 and opened on 13 September 1856. The South Durham and Lancashire Union Railway - which began at a junction with the Haggerleases branch at Spring Gardens Junction - was authorised in 1857; the section between St Helen Auckland and Barnard Castle opened on 1 August 1863. A direct line between St Helens Auckland and Bishop Auckland was authorised in 1858; this left the Shildon Tunnel spur at Fieldon's Bridge (grid reference NZ205273). Passenger services were briefly extended to Haggerleases in 1859. St Helens station was renamed West Auckland on 1 March 1878.

The Stockton and Darlington Railway amalgamated with the North Eastern Railway (NER) in 1863; the NER amalgamated with several other railways to form the London and North Eastern Railway (LNER) at the start of 1923; and upon nationalisation at the start of 1948, the LNER in its turn amalgamated with other railways to form British Railways.

The station was closed by British Railways on 18 June 1962.

== Locomotive depot ==
There was a locomotive depot, situated on the north side of the line to the east of the station, between the St Helen's Colliery and the Dilks Street underbridge (grid reference NZ201271). It was of the roundhouse pattern, with a square shed building and a single turntable. 22 locomotives were allocated to West Auckland at the end of 1920, 15 of which were 0-6-0s of NER Class P1. At this time, the depot was a sub-shed of Shildon, as were the depots at Wear Valley Junction, Stanhope and Wearhead.

At the time of the 1923 Grouping, there were 29 locomotives allocated to West Auckland, which was now responsible for the sub-depots at Wearhead, Wear Valley Junction and Stanhope. Stanhope depot was closed by the LNER in May 1930, and West Auckland was itself closed in April 1931; some of the locomotives formerly based at West Auckland were transferred to Shildon. However, when the depots at Wear Valley Junction and Shildon closed in July 1935, West Auckland depot was reopened; this was the only case of a locomotive depot being both closed completely and later reopened by the LNER.

At the start of 1948, the LNER was nationalised, and West Auckland fell within the new North Eastern Region of British Railways. At this time, 37 locomotives were allocated to West Auckland, mainly of LNER Class A8 (5 locomotives) and Class J25 (12); one (Class J21 no. 5064) was allocated to the sub-shed at Wearhead. In 1949, shed codes were allotted by British Railways, and West Auckland, together with Wearhead, was given the code 51F, the 51 denoting the Darlington district of the North Eastern Region. In 1950, 40 locomotives were allocated, of which the main classes were Class A8 (6 locomotives), J21 (10), and J25 (6). Wearhead closed in May 1954. The Class J25 locomotives were mainly used for banking westbound trains on the South Durham and Lancashire Union line up to Stainmore Summit.

In 1959, there were 35 locomotives at West Auckland, including Class J39 (7 locomotives), Class J72 (6), Class Q6 (6), and BR Standard Class 4 2-6-0 (6). The depot closed in February 1964, at which time 12 locomotives remained - these were transferred elsewhere, such as to Thornaby.

== Notes ==
Preceding station	Disused railways	Following station
Evenwood; Line and station closed	North Eastern Railway; Stockton and Darlington Railway	Bishop Auckland; Line closed, station open
Evenwood; Line and station closed	North Eastern Railway; Stockton and Darlington Railway	Shildon; Line closed, station open
