= Witton-le-Wear =

Village in County Durham, England

Coordinates: 54.676734°N 1.773391°W

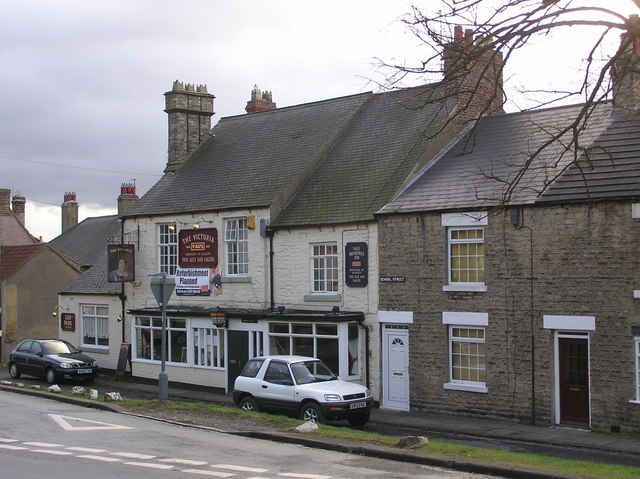
- School Street, Witton-le-Wear

- Location within County Durham
- Population: 690 (2011)
- OS grid reference: NZ150320
- Unitary authority: County Durham
- Ceremonial county: Durham
- Region: North East
- Country: England
- Sovereign state: United Kingdom
- Post town: BISHOP AUCKLAND
- Postcode district: DL14
- Dialling code: 01388
- Police: Durham
- Fire: County Durham and Darlington
- Ambulance: North East
- UK Parliament: Durham North West

Witton-le-Wear is a village in County Durham, North East England. It is situated on the north bank of the River Wear, 6 km (3.7 mi) to the north-west of Bishop Auckland.

== Geography and administration ==
Witton-le-Wear is part of the North West Durham Parliamentary constituency, and is represented by Richard Holden (Conservative). The village is within Weardale Ward, which elects two councillors to Durham County Council. The current councillors are Anita Savory (Independent) and John Shuttleworth (Independent). Witton-le-Wear also has an eight-member Parish Council.

The local police force is Durham Constabulary. Witton-le-Wear is in the Wear and Tees division.

== History ==
=== Etymology ===
The place name Witton or Whitton is fairly common in the north of England. While the name can mean "white farm", in the case of Witton-le-Wear Witton refers to a farm (Anglo-Saxon: ton) in or near woodland (Anglo-Saxon: widu). Witton-le-Wear's name is attested as Wudeton from 1104, but had become Wotton in Werdale by 1313. This subsequently evolved to the present form.

=== Industrial history ===
The farming hamlet of Witton-le-Wear was part of the Witton Castle estate, which was bought in 1816 by Sir William Chaytor for £78,000 from the Stobart family. He redeveloped the castle, and in 1819 developed the Jayne Pitt as part of the large Witton Park Colliery complex. This brought about the development of transport into the area, including the Etherley Incline Railway by George Stephenson, that connected to the Stockton and Darlington Railway (S&DR) at Shildon, and hence onwards via Stockton to Newport on the River Tees.

After the S&DR was extended into Bishop Auckland, the railway was able to access the limestone deposits within the upper River Wear valley. This brought employment to the valley through both mining, as well as production of both pig iron and cement, which was distributed by the railway to all parts of the United Kingdom.

=== Recent history ===
As the price of road haulage dropped, the railway fell into disuse and carried its last train in the early 1990s. Over recent years the Weardale Railway has been reinstated by the British American Railway Services (BARS) and is again used to transport locally mined opencast coal to Scunthorpe and Ratcliffe-on-Soar Power Station.

The line is also run as a heritage railway, operating on many weekends and holidays by Weardale Railway Trust in conjunction with the BARS, and provides a tourist route in and out of Weardale. A weekend halt has been provided at Witton-le-Wear since early 2013.

== Amenities ==
Witton-le-Wear's last village shop closed in 1998, meaning the village's only permanent amenities are its two public houses, The Dun Cow and the Victoria. There are two churches, the Anglican Church of St Philip and St James, and the Primitive Methodist Chapel. The Primitive Methodist Church is now privately owned, to be converted into a family home. The Anglican church has a congregation and still uses the original building for services. Witton's original Board School was erected in 1874, and replaced in 1968 with a new primary school in St James Gardens. There are around 100 pupils attending from Witton-le-Wear and surrounding villages. The original school now provides a Community Centre for the village which is used most days by a variety of groups and organisations.

Witton Castle Country Park is situated over the River Wear from the village and consists of a 15th-century castle and grounds.

== Landmarks ==
In the village is Witton Tower, a medieval pele tower with later additions. The village green has been a major feature of the village for over 200 years. The trees along the top were planted to celebrate Queen Victoria's Diamond Jubilee in 1897. Further trees have been added to celebrate the Silver and Golden Jubilees of Queen Elizabeth II and other important occasions.

== Notable residents ==
- Ernest Armstrong MP (1915–1996) was a British Labour politician and MP for North West Durham from 1964 to 1987. He served as parliamentary private secretary from 1965, labour whip, junior minister for Education and Science (1974-1975), Environment (1975-1979). In 1979 he became Deputy Speaker until he retired from active politics in 1987. Ernest Armstrong lived in Witton le Wear for a major part of his life and he was also a well known lay preacher in the Methodist chapel.
- Lydia de Burgh (1923–2007) was the only resident Irish artist to have had personal sittings with the Queen and the late Princess Alice, Duchess of Gloucester. She painted the Queen on several occasions. . Lydia and her family lived in Witton Hall for a time.
- John Garth (1721–1810), composer.
- Thomas Jackson (1579–1640), scholar and priest.
- Anthony Salvin (1799–1881), the architect, spent much of his boyhood at Willington, where he lived with his grandfather.
- Henry Taylor (1800–1886), born in Bishop Middleham, spent his youth in Witton-le-Wear with his stepmother at Witton Hall (now Witton Tower) in the high street. His father George was a friend of Wordsworth and the poet visited him in July 1838. In Witton, Taylor wrote The Cave of Ceada which was accepted for the Quarterly Review. Another poem, The Lynnburn, is about the river which runs through the village.
