= Escomb =

Village in England

Coordinates: 54.666°N 1.708°W

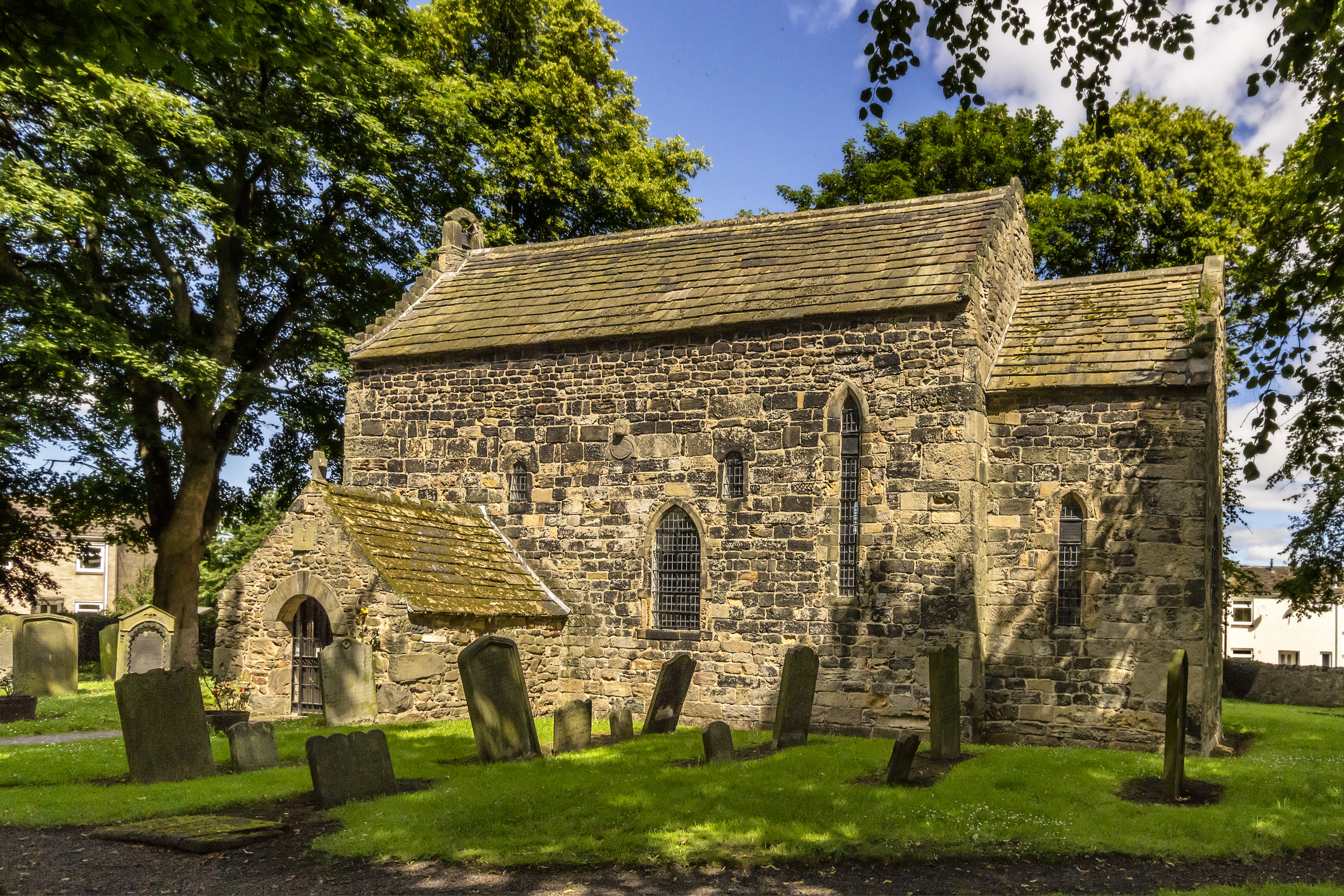
- Escomb parish church

- Location within County Durham
- Population: 358 (2001 census)
- OS grid reference: NZ189300
- Unitary authority: County Durham
- Ceremonial county: Durham
- Region: North East
- Country: England
- Sovereign state: United Kingdom
- Post town: Bishop Auckland
- Postcode district: DL14
- Dialling code: 01388
- Police: Durham
- Fire: County Durham and Darlington
- Ambulance: North East
- UK Parliament: Bishop Auckland

Escomb is a village and former civil parish on the River Wear about 1 1/2 miles (2.4 km) west of Bishop Auckland, in the County Durham district, in the ceremonial county of Durham, England. In 2001, it had a population of 358. In 2011, the ward had a population of 3323.

== Etymology ==
The name Escomb is of Old English origin. The name derived from the element edisc ("enclosures, enclosed park"), giving the name a meaning of "(place) at the enclosures".

== Parish churches ==
Escomb Church was built in the 7th or 8th century AD when the area was part of the Anglian Kingdom of Northumbria, and has been called "England's earliest complete church". The building includes long-and-short quoins characteristic of Anglo-Saxon architecture, and re-used Roman masonry from Binchester Roman Fort.

Until the 19th century, Escomb was a dependent chapelry of Bishop Auckland. In 1848, a vicarage was built at the top of the hill and Rev. Henry Atkinson became Escomb's first resident vicar for centuries.

The Anglo-Saxon church seated only 65 people, and in the 19th century Escomb's population outgrew it. In 1863, a new parish church, St John's, was completed next to the vicarage.

Thereafter, the old church repeatedly fell into disrepair. It was restored in 1875–80 by R. J. Johnson, again in 1927, and again in 1965, by Sir Albert Richardson.

In the 20th century, church attendance declined and became too small for St John's. In 1969, the Anglo-Saxon church reverted to being the parish church, and in 1971, St John's was demolished.

== Economic history ==
The George Pit coal mine was sunk in 1837, and an ironworks was opened at Witton Park in 1846.

In 1843, the Bishop Auckland and Weardale Railway was opened between Shildon Junction and Crook to take coal from the area. It passes Escomb but its nearest stop was Etherley railway station, which had been opened by 1847. The line was worked initially by the Stockton and Darlington Railway, through which it became part of the North Eastern Railway in 1863.

WC Stobart & Co's Etherley Colliery was Escomb's major employer from the middle of the 19th century until the seams of its pits became exhausted in the 1920s. The 1851 Census recorded 1,293 inhabitants of Escomb, most of whom worked at the pit.

British Rail closed the Bishop Auckland and Weardale line to passenger traffic in 1965 and to freight traffic in 1993. The Weardale Railway reopened the section past Escomb and through Etherley shortly thereafter.

== Civil parish ==
On 1 April 1937, the parish was abolished and merged with Bishop Auckland and West Auckland; part also went to form Crook and Willington. In 1931, the parish had a population of 3248.

== See also ==
- Escomb Bridge
- Northman of Escomb, involved in the transfer of Escomb to St Cuthbert's of Lindisfarne (later Durham Cathedral) in the 10th century
- Combe

== Amenities ==
Escomb has a public house, the Saxon Inn, that was built in the 17th century.

The village has a primary school.

== Sources ==
- Blair, Peter Hunter (1977) [1956]. An Introduction to Anglo-Saxon England (Second ed.). Cambridge & London: Cambridge University Press. pp. 157–158. ISBN 0-521-29219-0.
- Jenkins, Simon (1999). England's Thousand Best Churches. London: Penguin Books. pp. 170–172. ISBN 978-0-14-103930-5.
- Lewis, Samuel, ed. (1931) [1848]. A Topographical Dictionary of England (Seventh ed.). London: Samuel Lewis. pp. 181–186.
