= Low Etherley =

Village in United Kingdom

Coordinates: 54°39′N 1°44′W

Low Etherley is a village in County Durham, in England. It is located a few miles to the west of Bishop Auckland.

In 1825 the Stockton and Darlington Railway opened a horse-drawn branch line, the Etherley Incline Railway, from West Auckland to serve Witton Park Colliery, north of Etherley. This line passed through Low Etherley, where it was worked by a cable-hauled incline powered by a stationary steam engine.

== See also ==
- High Etherley
- Gaunless Bridge
