= Etherley =

Civil parish in County Durham, England

Coordinates: 54.629489°N 1.726381°W

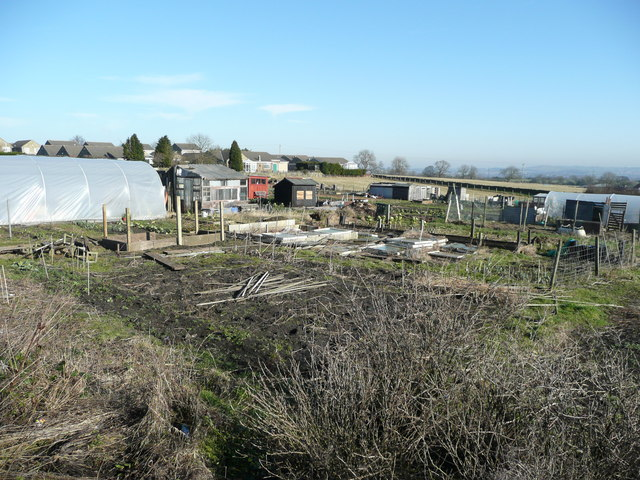
- Allotments at High Etherley

- Location within County Durham
- Population: 2,060 (2011)
- Civil parish: Etherley
- Unitary authority: County Durham
- Ceremonial county: Durham
- Region: North East
- Country: England
- Sovereign state: United Kingdom
- Post town: Bishop Auckland
- Postcode district: DL 14
- Police: Durham
- Fire: County Durham and Darlington
- Ambulance: North East
- UK Parliament: Bishop Auckland

Etherley, formerly West Auckland is a civil parish in County Durham, England. It includes Bildershaw, High Etherley, Low Etherley, Phoenix Row and Toft Hill. It had a population of 2,060 at the 2011 Census. On 17 July 1939 the parish was renamed "Etherley".
