= Toft Hill, County Durham =

Village in County Durham, England

Coordinates: 54.649°N 1.753°W

Toft Hill
- Location within County Durham
- OS grid reference: NZ1628
- Civil parish: Etherley
- Unitary authority: County Durham
- Ceremonial county: County Durham
- Region: North East
- Country: England
- Sovereign state: United Kingdom
- Post town: Bishop Auckland
- Postcode district: DL14
- Dialling code: 01388
- Police: Durham
- Fire: County Durham and Darlington
- Ambulance: North East
- UK Parliament: Bishop Auckland

Toft Hill is a hilltop village in County Durham, England straggling along the A68, a few miles to the west of Bishop Auckland and adjoining the village of High Etherley. An ancient site of defensive settlement and used by the Romans, the name of Toft Hill is possibly of Norse or Angle derivation and means "Hill Hill".

The village is underlaid by coal measures and saw expansion in the 19th century mining boom under the coal-owning Stobart family. The various drifts of their Carterthorne Colliery formed large extended galleries beneath the village. In recent years much of the village's archaeology has been swept away by open cast mining.

In 2023, Durham County Council began surveys for a new A68 bypass to reroute traffic around Toft Hill, to reduce the number of large vehicles passing through the village. This was cancelled by the Reform administration in February 2026, leading to the resignation of one local councillor from Reform and intense anger from the public, with legal action being pursued by local residents.
