= George Barrington (Royal Navy officer) =

British naval officer and politician (1794–1835)

Captain The Honourable George Barrington
- Born: 20 November 1794
- Died: 2 June 1835 (aged 40)
- Military career
- Allegiance: United Kingdom
- Branch: Royal Navy
- Rank: Captain

Captain George Barrington (20 November 1794 – 2 January 1835) was a Royal Navy officer and Whig politician.

== Career ==
Barrington served in the Royal Navy becoming Fourth Naval Lord in 1830. He was elected at the 1832 general election as a member of parliament (MP) for Sunderland, but resigned his seat in 1833 through the procedural device of appointment as Steward of the Chiltern Hundreds.

== Family ==
In 1827 he married Lady Caroline Grey, daughter of Charles Grey, 2nd Earl Grey; they had a son and a daughter.

Parliament of the United Kingdom
New constituency	Member of Parliament for Sunderland; 1832–1833; With: Sir William Chaytor	Succeeded by William Thompson; Sir William Chaytor
Military offices
New post	Fourth Naval Lord; 1830–1833	Succeeded by Sir Maurice Berkeley
