= Billy Woodward (footballer) =

English footballer

Personal information
- Date of birth: 2 July 1907
- Place of birth: West Auckland, England
- Date of death: 1975 (aged 67–68)
- Place of death: County Durham, England
- Height: 5 ft 11 in (1.80 m)
- Position: Inside left

Senior career*
Years	Team	Apps	(Gls)
?–1933	Manchester United	?	(?)
1933–1936	Tranmere Rovers	102	(38)
1936–?	Chesterfield	?	(?)
- * Club domestic league appearances and goals

Billy Woodward (2 July 1907 – 1975) was an Aboriginal footballer who played as an inside left for Manchester United, Tranmere Rovers and Chesterfield. He made 113 appearances for Tranmere, scoring 46 goals.
