= Wally Akers =

English footballer

Personal information
- Full name: Walter William George Akers
- Date of birth: 1917
- Place of birth: West Auckland, England
- Date of death: 1976 (aged 58–59)
- Height: 5 ft 7 in (1.70 m)
- Position: Outside forward

Senior career*
Years	Team	Apps	(Gls)
1934–1935	Wolverhampton Wanderers	0	(0)
1935	Newport County	0	(0)
1935–1937	Bournemouth & Boscombe Athletic	15	(4)
1937–1939	Chelsea	0	(0)
1939–1946	Mansfield Town	0^{[A]}	(0)
1946–1948	Gillingham	40	(20)
- Corby Town
- Goole Town

Managerial career
- 1950–1958: Corby Town
- 1958–1961: Kettering Town
- * Club domestic league appearances and goals

Walter William George Akers (1917–1976) was an English professional footballer either side of the Second World War.

== Playing career ==
Born in West Auckland, he began his professional career with Wolverhampton Wanderers in 1934, but left the club without ever playing for the first team, and joined Newport County, where he experienced a similar spell. He finally made his debut in The Football League for Bournemouth & Boscombe Athletic, where he made 15 League starts in total. After a short spell with Chelsea, in which he again played no first-team football, he joined Mansfield Town for the start of the 1939–40 season. He played three times and scored three goals before the League was abandoned due to the start of the war. After the war, he joined Gillingham of the Southern League, where he played for two seasons, scoring 20 goals in 40 games. One of his goals came in a 12–1 win over Gloucester City, which remains the club's biggest-ever win in a competitive fixture. In 1948, he moved on to Corby Town and later played for Goole Town.

== Managerial career ==
In 1950 he took over as manager of Corby, and led the team to the United Counties League championship in both his first two seasons in charge. He later managed Kettering Town.

== Notes ==
A. Akers played three matches, scoring three goals, at the start of the 1939–40 season, but the season was abandoned due to the outbreak of the Second World War and all matches played up to that point expunged.
