= Escomb Church =

Coordinates: 54.66597°N 1.70809°W

- Escomb Saxon Church
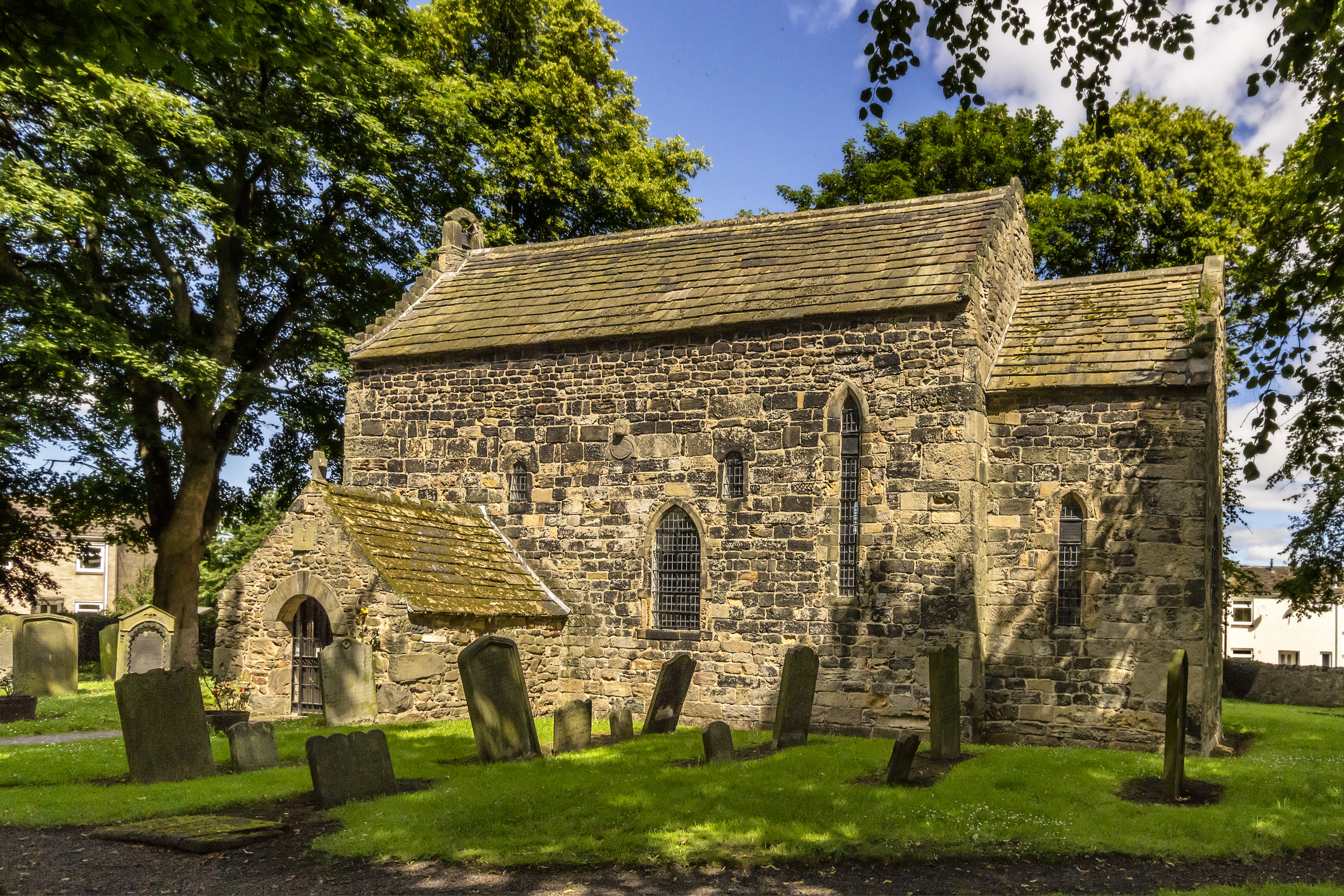
- View from the south

- Location within County Durham
- Location: Escomb, County Durham
- Country: England
- Denomination: Church of England
- Previous denomination: Roman Catholic
- Website: https://escombchurch.co.uk/

History
- Status: Parish church
- Founded: c. 675
- Dedication: St John the Evangelist (modern dedication)

Architecture
- Functional status: Active
- Heritage designation: Grade I listed
- Designated: 21 April 1952
- Style: Anglo-Saxon
- Years built: 7th century

Specifications
- Materials: squared sandstone with quoins

Administration
- Province: York
- Diocese: Durham
- Archdeaconry: Auckland

Escomb Church, officially Escomb Saxon Church, also known as St John's, Escomb, is the parish church of Escomb, County Durham, a village about 1.5 miles (2.4 km) west of the English town of Bishop Auckland. It is one of only four complete Anglo-Saxon churches remaining in England. (Note: The other surviving churches are St Laurence's Church, Bradford-on-Avon in Wiltshire, Greensted Church in Essex, and All Saints' Church, Brixworth (Northamptonshire).) It is a Grade I listed building. The current church is dedicated to St John the Evangelist. Except for a short interval in the 19th century, it has been in continuous use since it was built. The church may have been designed to house a religious community of monks. It was founded at a time when the area was part of the kingdom of Northumbria, but the church was not mentioned by the English monk Bede. It cannot be convincingly deduced that it must therefore have been built after Bede’s death in 735, as he named churches selectively. It has been dated variously at between 650 and 800.

No documentary evidence exists about the early history of Escomb Church or the saint it was originally named after. It was used as a chapelry to St. Andrew's Church in Bishop Auckland. During the 19th century, it became inadequate for the parish’s needs, and a new church was built. The old building was abandoned until 1867, when its age and value was recognised. It was repaired and reopened for services in 1880, but was used for services in summer. By 1904, it had again deteriorated; throughout the 1920s, money was raised for repairs. In December 1969 it reverted to being the parish church and, in 1971, St John's was demolished.

The original Anglo-Saxon building consisted of a tall, narrow nave and a chancel, built from irregular courses of sandstone, skilfully built from demolished buildings, most likely of Roman origin from Vinovia, the nearby Roman fort at Binchester. The interior is whitewashed. The chancel arch, which is notably tall, has radial voussoirs and the jambs are set alternately vertically and horizontally, an architectural style known as "Escomb fashion". Five of the windows are also of Anglo-Saxon origin. On the gable of the south porch of the church is a 7th- or early 8th-century sundial, the oldest of its kind still in its original setting in the walls of a building.

== Notability, function, and foundation date ==
The church at Escomb, which is dedicated to St John the Evangelist, has been described as the most complete of any surviving small Anglo-Saxon church in England. The English art historian Gerard Baldwin Brown, writing in 1925, described it as “one of the most perfect and in some respects most interesting Anglo-Saxon churches in the whole country”. Except for a short interval in the 19th century, when a new church in the village was built as a replacement, the church has been in continuous use since it was built.

The historian Charles McClendon believes that the belief that the church's small size implies it was built as the private church of a feudal lord to be anachronistic. According to McClendon, the church was probably designed to house a religious community of monks, considering the use of ashlar—a high quality building material—in its construction.

The church was founded at a time when the area was part of Northumbria. The Victorian historian Charles Clement Hodges noted that the church was not mentioned by the English monk Bede:

...it may, on architectural grounds, be placed nearer to the earlier than to the later period of Saxon building. On historical grounds we may put its date between the death of the Venerable Bede in 735 and the Danish invasion of 787. As Bede makes no mention of it, it is unlikely that it was standing in his time, and it is also unlikely that such a building would be begun in the unsettled period which followed the Scandinavian invasions of the latter part of the eighth and the whole of the ninth century.

— Charles Hodges, "Escomb Church, Durham", The Illustrated Archaeologist (1893)

According to the historians Harold and Joan Taylor, it cannot be convincingly deduced that the church must therefore have been built after Bede’s death in 735, as he named churches selectively. They date the building's foundation at between 650 and 800. The character of the building and its resemblance to other Northumbrian churches mean that it was built between the late 7th century and the late 9th century. According to The Grove Encyclopedia of Medieval Art and Architecture, the church’s layout resembles that of 6th–9th-century Anglo-Saxon secular timber halls.

== History ==
=== Early history ===
There is no documentary evidence about the early history of Escomb Church. An 1879 article in The Builder mentions that "for centuries" the church was used as a chapelry to St. Andrew's Church in Bishop Auckland. The village was never large: in 1183, 13 villeins were recorded as living there; by 1801, the population was 167.

=== Isolated location ===
Before the Industrial Revolution, Escomb was an isolated village on the banks of the River Wear, about 1 mile (1.6 km) from Bishop Auckland and accessible by a single lane that led to the river. Its isolation was both the cause of its preserved condition, and its escape from being destroyed by restorers. Hodges described how it was still an isolated place in 1893: “The road leading to it is a branch of a cross-road, between two main turn-pikes, and terminates at the village. There has, in consequence, been no traffic through it, and it was a place rarely visited.”

=== 19th century: neglect and restorations ===
The interior of Escomb Church, as illustrated by Charles Lynam in 1878: the chancel arch, two windows, and the baptismal font

In 1848 a vicarage was built at the top of the hill in the village, and Revd Henry Atkinson became Escomb's first resident vicar for centuries. As its population expanded during the 19th century, the church, with seating for 65 worshippers, became inadequate for the parish’s needs. In 1863 a new church was built next to the vicarage. The old church was abandoned until 1867, during which time it lost part of the roof. In 1867, the new vicar, Revd J. E. Lord, recognised the age and value of the old church, enclosed its churchyard with a wall, and began raising funds for the restoration of the building. In 1879, it was noted that:

“…many shingles from the roof have slipped from their places, and lie shattered in the churchyard. The glass of the windows is gone. The floor is damp and mossy. And the time when the building would have to be spoken of as a ruin is hastening on apace.”

— George Goodwin, "Asserted Saxon Church at Escomb", The Builder (1897)

In June that year, the Architectural and Archæological Society of Durham and Northumberland visited the church, after which it was repaired and reopened for service on 4 October 1880. With the exception of an account in the Journal of the British Archaeological Association, no illustrated description of the church had appeared by the 1890s.

It was fully restored in 1875–1880 by R.J. Johnson, at a cost of between £500 and £550. In October 1880, Joseph Lightfoot, Bishop of Durham, preached at a service to mark the completion of the restoration. The building had no heating or artificial light, and thereafter was used for only a few services a year, from June until August.

=== 20th century ===
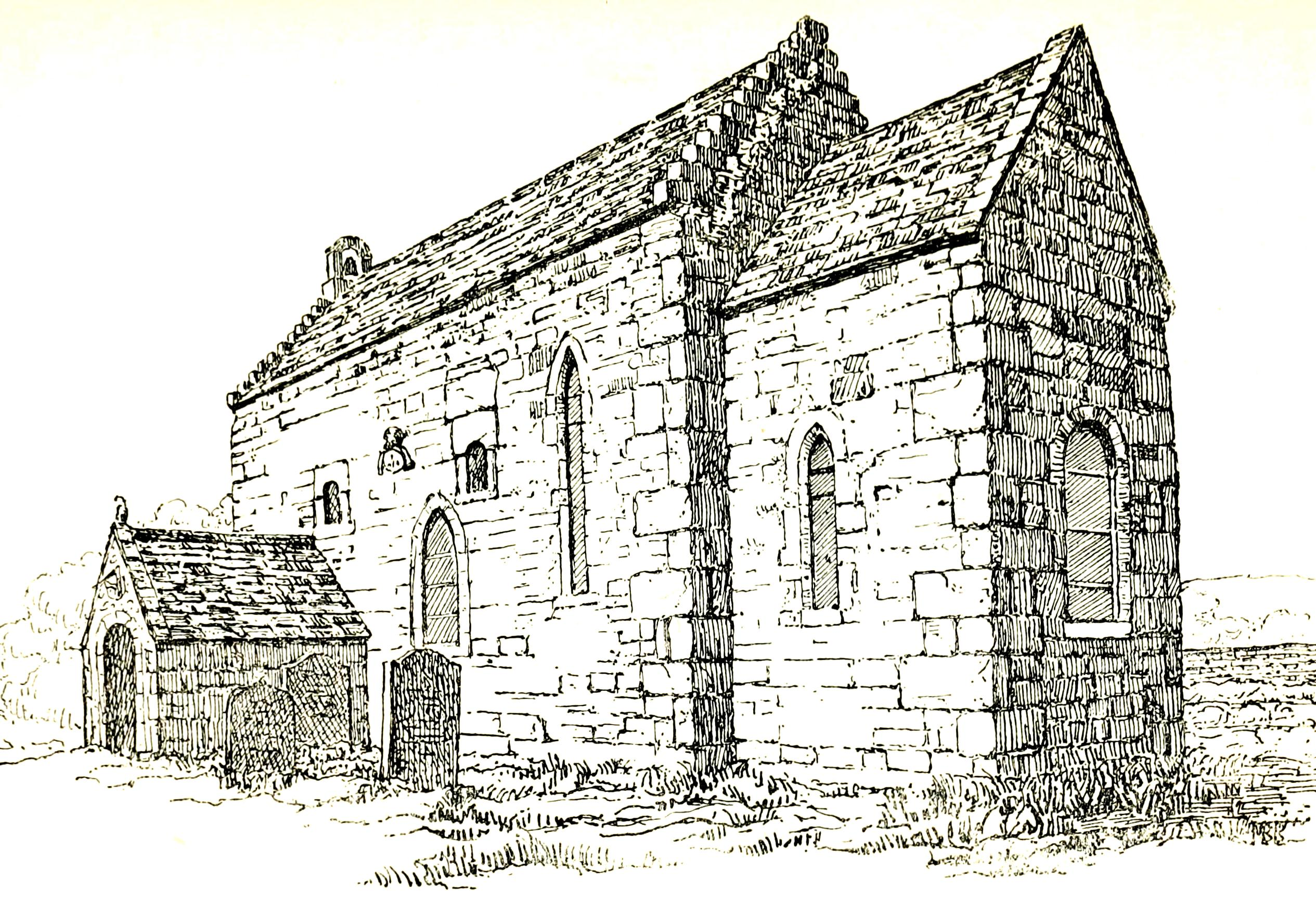
An illustration of the exterior of the church by Gerard Baldwin Brown (1925)

By 1904, the roof had again deteriorated. Throughout the 1920s, the parish raised money for the Escomb Church Restoration Fund, which by November 1925 had raised over £550. On 1 June 1927, Handley Moule, Bishop of Durham, presided at the Eucharist in the church to mark completion of the work.

The first surviving record of a proposal to install electric lighting in the church dates from 1940. In 1944 the installation of heating and lighting was proposed, but the Diocese of Durham refused permission for the work to go ahead, and in 1947 the issue prevented a midnight service on New Year’s Eve being held there. The lack of heating and lighting was discussed again in 1950, but neither were installed.

In 1959 a new vicar, Reverend Henry Lee, was appointed to the parish. In 1960 the parish agreed to refurbish the building and Lee resumed summer services in it. The architect Sir Albert Richardson prepared plans and in 1962 both the parish and the diocese accepted them. The plan was now for electric lighting and heating to be installed, along with a new altar and other furnishings. The cost of restoration and modernisation was estimated at £6,500. Historic Churches Preservation Trust donated £500 to the fund. In 1963 St John's church, completed only a century earlier, was inspected and found to need repairs estimated to cost £6,500. But church attendance had declined, so the Diocesan Pastoral Committee decided that restoring both of Escomb's churches was not justified. It was decided that the Anglo-Saxon church should once again be the parish church, and St John's should be deconsecrated and demolished. Lee refused the proposal, but in 1964 he retired; the diocese suspended the living and the rural dean was made priest in charge.

In 1965 the restoration work was finished and regular services started in the Saxon church. A service of thanksgiving for the restoration was held on 4 July. Two years later, the restoration was begun; in December 1969 the church reverted to being the parish church and, in 1971, St John's was demolished.

== Architecture ==
=== Layout and construction ===
C.C. Hodges' floor plan of the church (1897)

The original Anglo-Saxon church was made of irregular courses of squared sandstone; it now has a roof made from stone slates. The walls were skilfully built from parts of different buildings that had been demolished without being damaged. The blocks, some of which were 1.2 metres (3 ft 11 in) long, would have been difficult to handle and transport. The external quoins and the doorway jambs were all carefully designed to slope slightly inwards, an effect described by Fernie as “quite elegant, unlike the oddity of, for example, the sloping doorways popular in twelfth-century Ireland”.

The church is a stone version of the nave and chancel plan and is typical of churches of the late Saxon period. It is a classic example of a two-cell church. The proportions of the nave are narrow and tall, which is typical for churches of the period. The width of the nave is the same as the diagonal of the almost square chancel, which in turn is equal to a third of the length of the nave. The nave’s north wall is only 2 inches (51 mm) longer than the south. The nave is 13.24 metres (43.4 ft) long and 4.42 metres (14.5 ft) wide. The chancel measures 3.07 metres (10.1 ft) by 3.11 metres (10.2 ft). Externally, the quoins up to the eaves are Anglo-Saxon, with large stones set with their long faces alternating.

=== Roof ===
The roof is built of tied trusses with diagonal struts, possibly contemporary with raised eaves. The roof slates are stone, with stone gable coping to the chancel.

=== Walls ===
The interior of the church in 1893

Brown's depiction of the chancel arch (1925)

The north nave doorway, seen from the outside

A round-headed south window at Escomb

The walls, which are inclined inwardly, are around 0.69 metres (2 ft 3 in) thick, and are built from squared stones. A number have tooling or other marks. The larger-sized quoins are between 0.46 and 0.61 feet (0.14 and 0.19 m) long. The quoins have alternating faces and edges, in the manner of 'long and short work'. The courses on the interior have a more even surface as a result of being more evenly laid. The interior of the church is whitewashed, with small section of painted plaster visible in the north wall.

One stone on the exterior north wall of the nave bears a part of an inverted inscription that reads: VI LEG. The Legio VI Victrix was stationed in the area during the 2nd century. Most likely, all the building material at Escomb is of Roman origin, and was taken from Vinovia, the nearby Roman fort at Binchester. The stones used are notably larger than those from the Anglo-Saxon monastery at Jarrow, suggests that they came from a different source. The construction of the walls resembles that at Jarrow, and is almost indistinguishable from Roman walls like those in the Chester Roman Amphitheatre.

The west gable has a small stone bellcote; the tolling of the bell over the centuries has worn a deep, wide furrow.

=== "Escomb fashion" chancel arch ===
The chancel arch may be a Roman one dismantled and re-erected. Baldwin Brown compared features of the chancel arch with one of the gateways of Cilurnum on Hadrian's Wall, and suggested that it had been removed in its entirety, probably from Vinovia. (Note: Before the change in the course of the Wear, the fort was only 3.2 kilometres (2.0 mi) from Escomb.) Evidence for this theory is entirely lacking.

The chancel arch is tall and narrow, being 1.6 metres (5 ft 3 in) wide and at its apex is 4.6 metres (15 ft) high. It has radial voussoirs rising from chamfered imposts. The jambs are made from stones set alternately vertically and horizontally, an architectural style known as "Escomb fashion", as the earliest known example of this style is at Escomb. The style, which is characteristically Byzantine, indicated to Hodges of the influence of wood construction techniques.

At the top of the arch are some remains of fresco painting.

=== Original doorways ===
In the north wall are two original doorways topped by lintels—one in the chancel and the other in the nave. The rebate in the nave doorway is 5.1 centimetres (2.0 in) in depth round the jambs and the head, and is placed about 20 centimetres (8 in) from the outer face of the wall. The jambs are slightly inclined so that the doorway varies in width from 0.91 to 0.99 metres (3 ft 0 in to 3 ft 3 in). Externally, the lintel and jambs are joined by a mortise and tenon joint into each other. The jambs of the north door of the nave are made from three separate stones, two laid upright, and one laid flat between them to bond them into the wall; in contrast, the chancel door jambs consist of single stones.

Goodwin, writing in 1879, particularly admired this part of the church, noting: "I doubt whether any other ecclesiastical doorway of equally early age, so perfect and so interesting as this one, exists in England."

According to Taylor and Taylor, the differing designs of the two north doors suggest that the doorway in the chancel is Anglo-Saxon, but was made at a later date. The north nave door was still in use in 1965; the chancel door is blocked.

=== Windows ===
The church possesses five windows of Anglo-Saxon origin. The four original windows in the nave (now glazed) are constructed in an identical way. They have rectangular stone sills; the jambs are made of slabs of stone positioned such that the base of the window is wider than the top, where there is a single-stoned lintel. They are placed high up to give more light, to reduce draughts, and for defence purposes.

Escomb Church windows
	Exterior faces			Interior faces	
	Width (cm)	Height (cm)	Height above ground (m)	Width (cm)	Height (cm)
Round-headed south windows	38.1	81.3	4.013	73.7	170.2
Square-headed north windows	38.1	76.2	3.962	73.7	147.3
Round-headed west window	38.1	106.7	7.849	91.4	129.5

The heads of the two south windows are cut from two stones, one forms the outer head of the window, the other extends through the wall. The jambs, which extend through the church wall and to rest on flat stones, still show the vertical grooves which held the original wooden shutters. The lancet windows are 13th century; three larger windows date from the early 19th century. The west window has irregular voussoirs; there is an original round-headed window at the top of the gable, about 7.9 metres (26 ft) from the ground. Its head is made of a massive rectangular lintel, and the jambs are made from two stones. The lintels of the north windows extend as one stone through the full thickness of the wall.

=== Anglo-Saxon sundial and other features ===
The Anglo-Saxon sundial

On the gable of the porch of the church is a 7th- or early 8th-century sundial, which is considered to be the oldest of its kind still in its original setting in the walls of a building. The dial, which is an almost complete circle, projects from the wall, and is has an outer ornamental border. Three faint lines are visible—pointing down and at 45° on either side. The hole for the gnomon has survived, and is lined on the inside with lead. Above the dial projects an Anglo-Saxon relief of an animal's head, with a tassel-like tail hanging to the right and a pointed head on the opposite side. The sundial is placed mid-way between the two south windows, about 4.9 metres (16 ft) above ground level; it measures 48.3 centimetres (19.0 in) across.

Other architectural features inside the church at Escomb include:

- a medieval grave marker in the form of a carved Anglo-Saxon cross; set above the altar;
- fragments of Saxon crosses against the north wall;
- a piscina in the chancel;
- an octagonal stone bowl and oblong pedestal baptismal font at the west end;
- part of the Anglo-Saxon cobble-stone flooring, located near the font.

At an unknown date the eaves were raised. The nave now has a crow-stepped gable at each end. Some simple Gothic windows were inserted in the 13th century, and the south porch was built in the 14th century. In the 19th century, more windows were inserted and a new door was installed in the porch. The door leading inside has a flat stone lintel above it. Inside the porch are pieces of carved stone and other objects, including those from and past excavations.

=== Archaeological investigations ===
The original location of the church's original main entrance has not been discovered. Archaeological excavations showed that that the present south porch is a later addition to the original building. This archaeological work did reveal the foundations of two porticuses (small rooms). Fernie presumes that the eastern porticus was a kind of sacristy, and was possibly on two levels. This porticus was on the north side of the chancel, and could be accessed from the chancel and from outside. A second porticus adjoined the west wall and probably had an outside door but no access from the nave. On the exterior of the west wall are grooves where a now lost steeply-pitched roof of this extension to the church once existed.

== Visiting and worship ==
The church is used for worship, and can be opened by visitors using a key obtained from a house in the village from 9.00 am. The key hangs outside No 28 Saxon Green, and is available to collect during daylight hours. There is a service every week at 11am.

== Sources ==
- Brown, Gerard Baldwin (1925). The Arts In Early England. London: John Murray.
- Cook, George Henry (1954). The English Mediaeval Parish Church. London: Phoenix House Ltd.
- Fisher, E.A. (1957). An Introduction to Anglo-Saxon Architecture and Sculpture. London: Faber & Faber.
- Goodwin, George, ed. (1879). "Asserted Saxon Church at Escomb". The Builder. London: 973–974.
- Hunter Blair, Peter (1977) [1956]. An Introduction to Anglo-Saxon England (Second ed.). Cambridge & London: Cambridge University Press. ISBN 978-0-521-29219-1.
- Fernie, Eric (1983). The Architecture of the Anglo-Saxons. Holmes & Meier.
- Hodges, Charles Clement (1893). Allen, John Romilly (ed.). "Escomb Church, Durham". The Illustrated Archaeologist. 1: 225–236.
- Hourihane, Colum P., ed. (2012). The Grove Encyclopedia of Medieval Art and Architecture. Vol. 1. Oxford, UK; New York: Oxford University Press. ISBN 978-0-19-539536-5.
- McClendon, Charles B. (2005). The Origins of Medieval Architecture: Building in Europe, A.D 600-900. Yale University Press.
- Pevsner, Nikolaus (1953). County Durham. The Buildings of England. Harmondsworth: Penguin Books. p. 142.
- Taylor, Harold MacCarter; Taylor, Joan (1965). Anglo-Saxon Architecture. Vol. 1. Cambridge, UK: Cambridge University Press.
