= High Etherley =

Village in County Durham, England

Coordinates: 54.651421°N 1.7444201°W

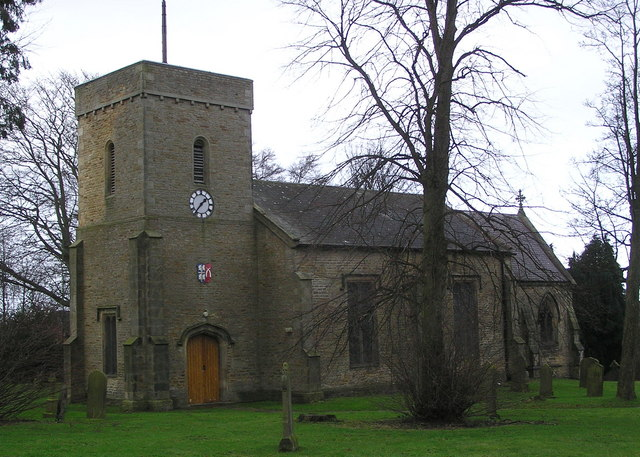
- St. Cuthbert's church, High Etherley

- Location within County Durham
- OS grid reference: NZ165892
- Civil parish: Etherley
- Unitary authority: County Durham
- Ceremonial county: Durham
- Region: North East
- Country: England
- Sovereign state: United Kingdom
- Police: Durham
- Fire: County Durham and Darlington
- Ambulance: North East
- UK Parliament: Bishop Auckland

High Etherley is a village in County Durham, England. It is situated on a hill approximately 4 miles west of Bishop Auckland. Entering High Etherley on the A68 from West Auckland the village continues on the B6282 towards Bishop Auckland.

High Etherley is in the civil parish of Etherley. The population of the parish at the United Kingdom 2011 census was 2,060.

High Etherley has two places of worship, St Cuthbert's Church and a Methodist chapel. There is one public house, the Three Tuns. The village also hosts the Etherley Cricket Club.

== Notable residents ==
Dehenna Davison, the former MP for Bishop Auckland.

== See also ==
- Low Etherley
