= Witton Castle =

Castle in County Durham, England, United Kingdom

- County Durham, England
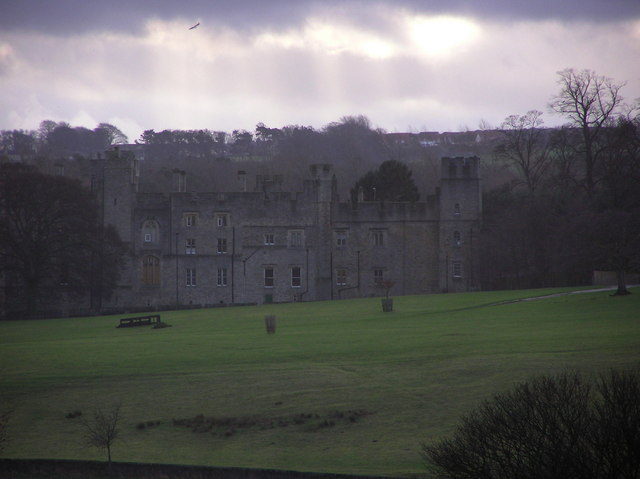
- Witton Castle

Site information
- Type: Rebuilt in 19th century

Location
- Shown within County Durham
- Coordinates: 54.6684°N 1.7643°W
- Grid reference: grid reference NZ153304

Witton Castle is a much-altered 15th-century castle, which is the centrepiece of a holiday and caravan country park at Witton le Wear, near Bishop Auckland, County Durham. It is a Grade II* listed building.

== Details ==
Sir Ralph Eure obtained a licence to crenellate his manor house in 1410 and created the castle. The castle was held by Royalist Sir William Darcy during the English Civil War. He compounded for the return of his confiscated estate which was sold by his descendant Henry Darcy to William Cuthbert in 1743. The castle then shortly passed to the Hopper family but was severely damaged in a fire which in 1796 destroyed most of the castle interior.

In 1816 William Chaytor of Croft Hall, Yorkshire purchased the castle estate from the then owner, John Robert Hopper, for £78,000 and restored the fabric and rebuilt the interior in modern style. The estate was rich in coal and Witton Park Colliery was sunk in 1825. Sir William Chaytor served as High Sheriff of Durham in 1839. Members of the Chaytor family lived at Witton until the mid 20th century.

== See also ==
- Castles in Great Britain and Ireland
- List of castles in England
