= Ken Hardwick =

English footballer (1924–1977)

Personal information
- Full name: Kenneth Hardwick
- Date of birth: 6 January 1924
- Place of birth: West Auckland, England
- Date of death: 4 June 1977 (aged 53)
- Position: Goalkeeper

Senior career*
Years	Team	Apps	(Gls)
–1945	Rossington Colliery		
1945–1957	Doncaster Rovers	308	(0)
1957–1960	Scunthorpe United	96	(0)
1960	Barrow	12	(0)
- * Club domestic league appearances and goals

Kenneth Hardwick (6 January 1924 – 4 June 1977) was an English footballer who played as a goalkeeper for Doncaster Rovers, Scunthorpe United and Barrow.

== Career ==
Hardwick first played for Rovers during the war, 26 games in total. From his league debut against Nottingham Forest on 26 December 1947, Hardwick became Rovers first choice keeper. That season Rovers were relegated from The Second Division but in the 1949−50 season they stormed the Third Division North and gained promotion back to League Division 2 where he spent the rest of his time with them.

With Harry Gregg as his understudy for four seasons, this was a golden period for Doncasters keepers.

In 1955, at the age of 30, Hardwick was invited to an England Under-23 trial. The FA withdrew the invitation once the error was realised.

After Harry Gregg took over his position at Doncaster, he moved first to Scunthorpe, then ended his playing days at Barrow.
