= South Church railway station =

Railway station in County Durham, England

Coordinates: 54°39′8″N 1°39′35″W

South Church

General information
- Location: South Church, County Durham; England
- Grid reference: NZ221286

Other information
- Status: Disused

History
- Opened: 19 April 1842; 183 years ago
- Closed: c. 1845; 180 years ago
- Original company: Stockton and Darlington Railway
Location

South Church railway station was on the Stockton and Darlington Railway.

== History ==
The first section of the Bishop Auckland and Weardale Railway, from a junction with the Stockton and Darlington Railway near Shildon and including the 1,225-yard (1,120 m) Shildon Tunnel, opened as far as South Church (also known as St Andrew Auckland) in January 1842. The station opened to passengers on 19 April 1842, and closed circa 1845, the line having been extended to Crook in late 1843.

Trains on the present-day Tees Valley Line pass the site of the station.

== Routes ==
Preceding station	Historical railways	Following station
Shildon; Line and station open	Stockton and Darlington Railway; Bishop Auckland & Weardale Railway	Bishop Auckland; Line and station open
