= Witton Park Colliery =

Coal mine in County Durham, England

- Location within England
- Location: Witton-le-Wear, Durham, England; 54°40′16″N 1°44′22″W
- Products: Coal
- Opened: June 1819
- Closed: April 1925
- Company: Sir William Chaytor

Witton Park Colliery was a coal mine located in Witton Park, near Witton-le-Wear and Bishop Auckland in County Durham, Northern England.

== Development ==
Part of the Durham Coalfield, coal deposits in the Witton Park area were known to be close to the surface, enabling coal to be extracted through shallow mining methods. Starting in 1756, exploratory boreholes were drilled on the Witton Castle estate, owned by the Stobart family, to locate commercially viable coal seams. However, early exploration efforts did not reveal any significant coal deposits.

In 1816, William Chaytor of Croft Hall, Yorkshire, purchased the Witton Castle estate for £78,000. He expanded the number of trial boreholes, but it wasn't until the development of the Jane Pit in 1819 that commercial coal extraction began. This success led to the redevelopment of the Mary Ann drift mine into a deep colliery and the subsequent development of the George Pit, Corving Pit, and finally the William Pit.

The commercial success of Witton Park Colliery spurred the development of additional coal mines in the surrounding area, resulting in nearly 100 pits being established within a 5 miles (8 km) radius over the next 150 years.

=== Closure ===
After the closure of the Witton Park Iron Works, the coal mines in the area lost their primary local market and became entirely dependent on the North Eastern Railway for the distribution of their coal. After nearly 100 years of operation, the accessible coal reserves were in steep decline. The onset of World War I and the loss of a significant number of skilled miners led to the closure of George Pit in 1917, followed by the closure of Jane Pit in April 1925, resulting in the loss of 255 jobs.

As a result, many residents left the village to find work in other coal mining and steel-making districts. During the 1930s, some moved to help construct the new British Army base at Catterick, or later to work at the Royal Ordnance Factory in Aycliffe.

== Witton Park Ironworks ==
After securing suitable lease rights, the partnership of Bolckow and Vaughan began constructing the Witton Park Ironworks in 1845, marking the establishment of the first ironworks in the Northeast of England. Due to the development of similar ironworks in Shropshire, many of the early workers were of Irish and Welsh descent.

With limestone and coal sourced from Witton Park, ironstone was initially obtained from established supplies in the West Midlands. The No.1 Blast Furnace was ignited on St. Valentine's Day in 1846. The company began constructing No.5 Blast Furnace on 24 May 1870, which became operational on 17 April 1871. The similarly sized No.6 Blast Furnace was inaugurated on Guy Fawkes Day in 1873, and both furnaces were operational by early 1875. Each of these furnaces had a production capacity of 1,100 tons per week.

As trade in iron declined and was gradually replaced by steel, the owners decided to relocate steel production to the coast in Cleveland to avoid railway transport charges. After partially closing in 1878, the ironworks were fully shut down on 19 May 1884. Deconstruction began almost immediately, and by 1900, the mill— which spanned 1 mile (1.6 km) in length and .5 miles (0.80 km) in width— had been demolished. Today, only the shells of the No.5 and No.6 Blast Furnaces remain.

== Transport ==
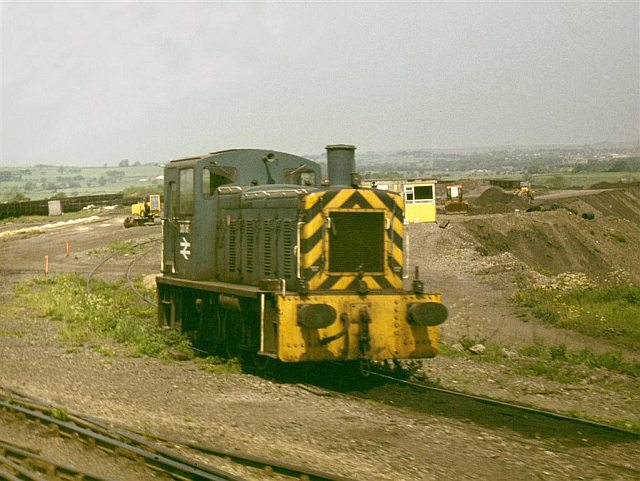
British Rail Class 03 03067 awaits to shunt spent ballast wagons, June 1978

Initially, coal distribution was carried out by horse and cart. However, due to the large volumes of coal being extracted and the high cost of distribution, a more efficient transportation method was needed. George Stephenson was contracted to build a suitable railway to transport the coal down from the hills. He constructed the Etherley Incline Railway, which featured iron rails set on stone blocks. Opened in 1825, the railway used a stationary beam engine to control the descent of wagons from the colliery to the River Gaunless. Horses then pulled the wagons to the foot of the Brusselton Incline, which descended into Shildon. Initially, the coal was transported by horse from this point, but this method was later replaced by the Stockton and Darlington Railway, which carried the coal to Newport on the River Tees. The Etherley Incline closed in 1843, and today it is designated as an ancient monument by English Heritage, and is thus protected.

After World War II, the site of Witton Park Ironworks was taken over by British Railways, which used it to dump spent ballast materials into a landfill site until 1989.
