= Sir William Chaytor, 1st Baronet =

British politician and businessman

Sir William Chaytor, 1st Baronet (29 April 1771 – 28 January 1847) was a British politician and businessman.

Chaytor was the illegitimate son of William Chaytor and Jane Lee, who subsequently married.

He had banking interests and was a major landowner in north east England, where he owned Witton Park, the estate of Witton Castle, within which he developed the Witton Park Colliery. He became a board member of the Stockton and Darlington Railway which served that colliery. The architect Ignatius Bonomi extended Witton Castle and built the Croft Spa Hotel and the now-demolished Clervaux Castle near Croft for Chaytor.

Chaytor was made a baronet in 1831. He served as a Whig Member of Parliament for Sunderland from 1832 to 35 and was a supporter of Earl Grey and of the Reform Act 1832. He was appointed High Sheriff of Durham in 1839.

Chaytor was married to Isabella (1781–1854). Their eldest son, also William Chaytor, was also a Member of Parliament.

== Notes ==
Parliament of the United Kingdom
| New constituency | Member of Parliament for Sunderland; 1832–1835; With: George Barrington 1832–1833; William Thompson 1833–1835 | Succeeded by William Thompson; Andrew White |
Baronetage of the United Kingdom
| New creation | Baronet (of Croft and Witton Castle); 1831–1847 | Succeeded by William Richard Carter Chaytor |
