= South Church, County Durham =

Village in County Durham, England

Coordinates: 54.6507°N 1.6645°W

South Church
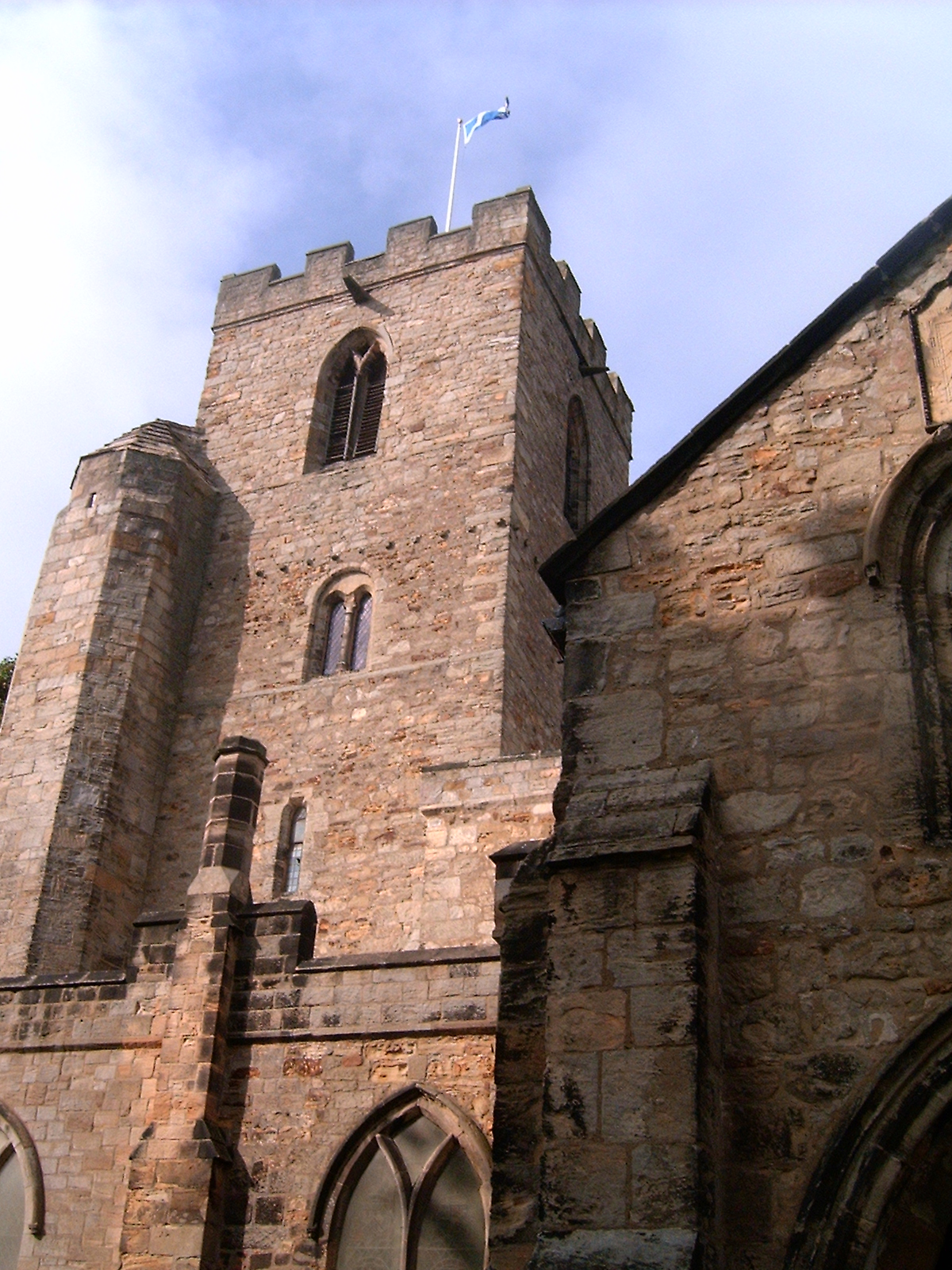
- St. Andrew's parish church

- Location within County Durham
- OS grid reference: NZ217284
- Unitary authority: County Durham
- Ceremonial county: County Durham
- Region: North East
- Country: England
- Sovereign state: United Kingdom
- Police: Durham
- Fire: County Durham and Darlington
- Ambulance: North East

South Church is a village just south of Bishop Auckland in County Durham, England.

St Andrew's church is the largest church in County Durham and a Grade I listed building. The church was built in the thirteenth century and acted as a collegiate church. The astronomer and mathematician Thomas Wright was buried in the churchyard of St Andrew's after his death in 1786.

The area between the River Gaunless and the Bishop Auckland town boundary is currently unparished, but 2023 proposals recommend taking this area into the town. However, the village spills across the Gaunless into Dene Valley parish, so that part is parished already.

South Church railway station opened in 1842 but was in operation for only about three years. Nowadays the area is served by Bishop Auckland railway station.
