= Shildon Tunnel =

Railway tunnel in County Durham, England

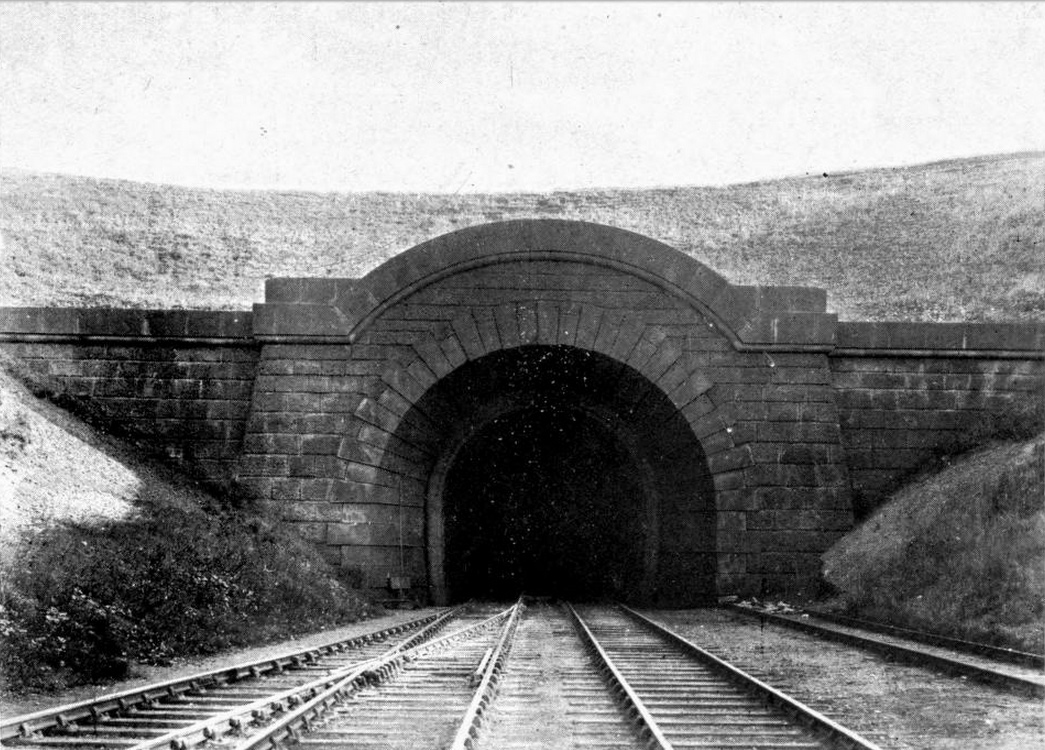
- Northern portal of Shildon Tunnel
- Interactive map of Shildon Tunnel

Overview
- Other name: Prince of Wales Tunnel
- Line: Tees Valley Line
- Location: Shildon, County Durham, England
- Coordinates: 54.636°N 1.645°W
- OS grid reference: NZ232262
- Status: Open

Operation
- Work began: 1839
- Opened: 10 January 1842; 19 April 1842 (to traffic)
- Owner: Network Rail

Technical
- Length: 1,220 yards (1,120 m) (Note: Various lengths are quoted by NER records; 1,217 yards (1,113 m), 1,220 yards (1,120 m), and 1,225 yards (1,120 m). Modern mapping states that it is 1,220 yards (1,120 m).)
- No. of tracks: 1
- Track gauge: 1,435 mm (4 ft 8 1/2 in) standard gauge

Shildon Tunnel is a railway tunnel on the Tees Valley line between Shildon and Bishop Auckland in County Durham, England. Although designed to have two tracks, the line is single-track through the tunnel and on to Bishop Auckland. It was opened in 1842 by the Shildon Tunnel Company to avoid a railway incline over the 100-foot (30 m) hill that the tunnel bores through, and later sold outright to the Stockton and Darlington Railway (S&DR). By at least 1880, rolling stock had become wider and the tunnel could not accommodate two trains passing through at the same time; the two tracks were subsequently reduced to a single track in 1967 after many years of single-train occupancy.

== History ==
Work on the 1,220-yard (1,120 m) long Shildon Tunnel was started in April 1839 before the tunnel was opened in January 1842. The tunnel route afforded the railway company an alternative route north through the magnesian limestone ridge to the north of Shildon, and meant that traffic did not need to traverse the inclines on the Black Boy Colliery branch (Note: One theory as to how the colliery was so named, is how covered in coal-dust the young boys were who worked down the mine.) which reached a height of 500 feet (150 m) above Shildon. The original Stockton and Darlington Railway (S&DR) route over the ridge into the River Gaunless valley was effected by the Brusselton Incline, west of Shildon, but the building of a tunnel through the 100-foot (30 m) ridge just north of Shildon (known as the Shield), was an attractive prospect to the owners of the S&DR as it would speed up the movement of coal traffic.

Although built privately (the owners did not apply for an act of Parliament) at a cost of £120,000 (equivalent to £10,028,000 in 2025) by three of the directors of the Stockton and Darlington railway under the name of the Shildon Tunnel Company, the tunnel was sold to the S&DR in 1847 for £223,450 (equivalent to £20,043,000 in 2025). This sale proved useful to the proprietors as eight years later, when ironstone was discovered in the hills south of Middlesbrough, their rental charges for the use of the Wear Valley and Middlesbrough and Redcar railways, was offset by the profits from the sale of the tunnel. Thereafter, the S&DR charged customers at a rate of six shillings per ton of coal carried through the tunnel, which was reduced to two shillings per ton by a House of Commons committee looking into rates of charge on the railways.

Work on the site was overseen by John Harris, to a consulted design by Thomas Storey, and eight local contractors who had all been awarded different sections of the tunnel to dig out. At the start, the owners of Adelaide Colliery (west of the northern tunnel portal) were contracted to supply bricks for the tunnel walls, but their supply could not keep up with demand, and so the tunnel builders started their own brickworks to cope with demand. During construction, water ingress was a serious problem, and it was dealt with by pumping it away, which made the village well dry up within a matter of weeks; the builders were obliged to find a new source of water for the village of Old Shildon. The construction phase involved the digging of seven vertical shafts to a depth of 118 feet (36 m), which was undertaken by Irish navvies.

The height of the tunnel is 23 feet 4 inches (7.11 m), the width is 21 feet (6.4 m), and seven million bricks were used in its construction. The line through the tunnel is almost completely straight, falling on a gradient of 1-in-250 northwards, and the greatest depth of the tunnel below the surface is 120 feet (37 m). When built, the width of the tunnel could accommodate two tracks, but the clearance between the tracks became insufficient for two trains to pass through at the same time, and so eventually only a single track was used. When the tunnel was built, the loading gauge of the rolling stock was narrower than stock built in later years. Railwaymen who operated the steam trains through the tunnel often reported the uneven clearance along the tunnel walls, and certain locomotives, such as the LNER Pacifics which had high tenders, had to be operated smokebox-first on the double track formation, as the driver could not put his head out of the cab to see what was happening ahead. Although both tracks remained through the tunnel for some time, single track occupancy through the tunnel was observed by at least 1880, when the report into the August crash stated that "...Shildon Tunnel is about 1,280 yards long [sic], and, on account of the narrowness of the space between the lines of rails, only one passenger train at a time is allowed to be in it, there being signal cabins for carrying out this mode of working near both ends of the tunnel..." (Note: A report in the National Archives from 1844-45 details the costs of installing signalling cabins at either end of the tunnel.) Eastbound (towards Darlington) trains had to be banked up through the tunnel, and this meant that the run-time through was usually eight minutes. Rule 113 from the S&DR rulebook stated:

Two trains shall not be allowed to be in the tunnel at the same time except when coupled together before entering and this is only allowed with laden mineral trains going east; and in no case more than three trains are allowed to be coupled together. Empty trains going west, must always pass single.

The ceremonial laying of the last brick on 10 January 1842, was undertaken by Luke Wandles and Henry Booth (the engineer and contractor), and the tunnel was named as "Prince of Wales", after Queen Victoria's son who had been born two months earlier and who would be crowned King Edward VII. It opened to regular traffic on 19 April 1842, and at the same time, a new station was provided at Shildon on the formation of the line through the tunnel, allowing the single platform station at Mason's Arms crossing to be closed. The line through the tunnel ran to South Church, then Bishop Auckland. In 1853, a new line from a junction at the northern end of the tunnel (often called the Tunnel Branch), was opened to West Auckland railway station, allowing Brusselton Incline to be avoided for freight, passenger services were not wholly diverted onto the new line until October 1858. After many years of single train occupancy, the track through the tunnel was singled in 1967.

Two parts of the tunnel construction are grade II listed; the southern portal of the tunnel, and the aqueduct south of the tunnel which was built in 1842 after the tunnel had opened and suffered a flood from a stream. The aqueduct was built to a design by Robert Wilson, and has three segmental arches spanning the railway's approach to the southern tunnel portal. It was reported in 2023 that the stream running over the aqueduct had run dry.

In 2008, four of the ventilation shafts of the tunnel were capped and demolished by Network Rail. A release at the time stated "The four shafts are in need of remedial work, and as they weren't being used, it makes more sense to remove them rather than repair them, which means we have to do less work on the tunnel itself."

== Portal locations ==
- Northern portal: 54.640°N 1.648°W
- Southern portal: 54.631°N 1.642°W - grade II listed. Biddle describes the tunnel portal as "...large rusticated stone blocks, with roll voussoirs, a heavy cornice, and large moulded modillions. Curiously, the tunnel mouth is splayed inwards, accentuating tight clearances in an uneven bore..."

== Accidents and incidents ==
- 1842 – Water poured into the tunnel through a fissure in the roof – all traffic ceased whilst a surface water stream was diverted around the south side of the tunnel.
- 2 November 1864 – an axle snapped on a loaded coal wagon passing through the tunnel. This resulted in much of the train being derailed and the track formation being torn up.
- June 1865 – a locomotive exploded within the tunnel, seriously injuring the footplate crew.
- 5 June 1874 – a passenger train running northwards through the tunnel crashed into some mineral wagons being shunted at Blackboy [sic] Junction. Several passengers were seriously injured.
- 27 August 1880 – a train from Bishop Auckland was heading south and derailed north of the tunnel. the train stayed upright and ploughed 200 metres (660 ft) into the tunnel. panic ensued in the darkness, but there were no reported deaths and the gas pipes for lighting the train did not rupture, so no fire was reported either.
- 19 January 1885 – a connecting rod on a steam engine broke, which resulted in the train derailing inside the tunnel.
- 14 April 1885 – a mineral train derailed inside the tunnel. The report states that the "old line" through Shildon was used, possibly meaning the Black Boy Colliery branch.
- 21 November 1891 – wagons derailed inside the tunnel, leading to at least two passenger trains having to be hauled over the Black Boy incline above the tunnel.
- 16 February 1915 – a foreman platelayer was struck by a passing train in the tunnel and was killed.
