= Brusselton Incline =

Former railway incline in England

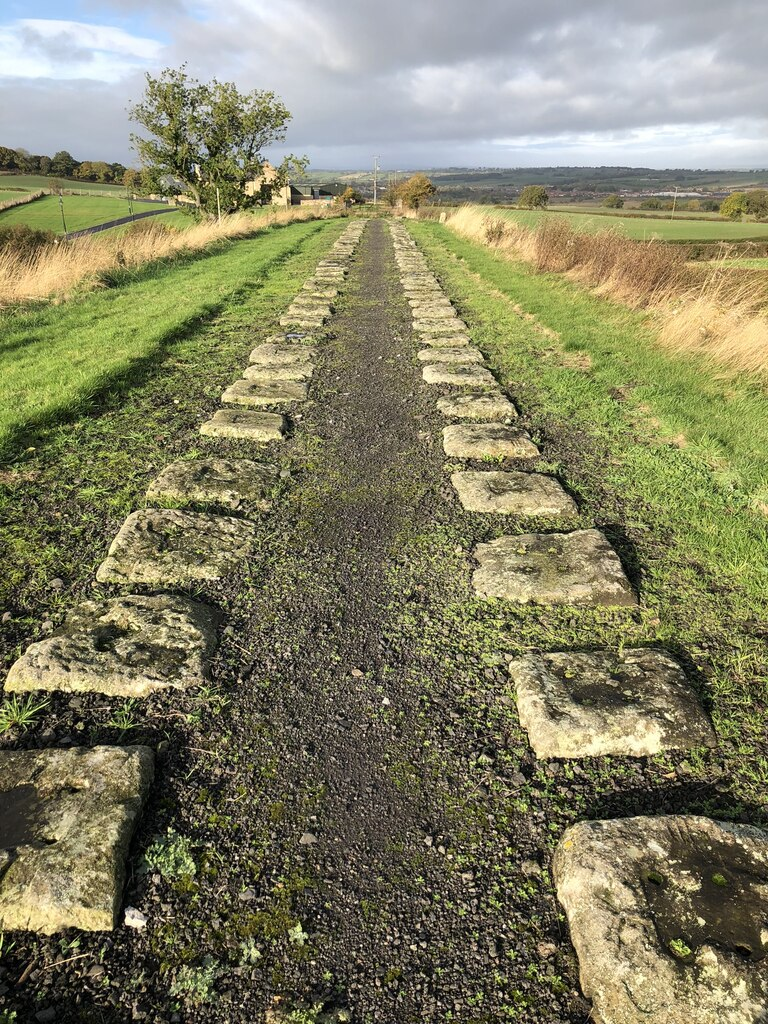
- Stone sleepers on Brusselton Incline

Overview
- Other names: Brusselton Bank; Brusselton Ridge
- Status: Closed
- Owner: Stockton and Darlington Railway
- Website: brusseltonincline.group

History
- Opened: 1825
- Closed: 1858

Technical
- Line length: 2,676 yards (2,447 m)
- Number of tracks: 1
- Track gauge: 1,435 mm (4 ft 8 1/2 in) standard gauge
- Highest elevation: 450 ft (140 m)

Scheduled monument
- Designated: 23 February 2023
- Reference no.: 1480914

Brusselton Incline was a section of the original Stockton and Darlington Railway between Witton Park and Stockton in County Durham, England. The need to transport coal from the collieries around West Auckland to the docks on the River Tees at Stockton necessitated going over two hills, the Etherley and Brusselton ridges, on inclines (or inclined planes). Whilst largely meant for goods traffic, passengers were also transported up and down the incline between 1825 and 1858, when a diversionary route at Shildon near the bottom of the eastern part of Brusselton Incline, rendered the incline redundant. The incline was worked by a stationary steam engine located at the summit, and this pulled wagons up the incline and slowly released them down with the aid of ropes. The incline operated as a single line with the ability for trains to pass at the summit, and did not operate as a self-acting incline, whereby descending wagons under gravity, simultaneously haul wagons up the incline.

Although it opened in 1825, the stationary steam engine was replaced in 1826, and then again in 1831. The formation of the incline has been breached by the Shildon bypass (the A6072 road), but the engine house at the summit was converted into a private dwelling, and is believed to be the oldest extant example of an incline engine house, still in existence. The inclines at Brusselton and Etherley are also believed to be the first examples of its type with a stationary engine to work both sides of an incline.

== History ==
Brusselton Incline is some 9 miles (14 km) north-west of Darlington, on the original formation of the Stockton and Darlington Railway (S&DR). In May 1823, the Stockton and Darlington Railway Act 1823 (4 Geo. 4. c. xxxiii) was given assent in Parliament, and besides the historic note about the S&DR being the first railway to carry passengers as approved by an Act of Parliament, it also contained the a statement of intent for the inclines at Etherley and Brussleton; "..[the company is given permission to] make, erect and set up one permanent or fixed Steam Engine [sic] at or near each of the inclined Planes [sic].." The incline route was initially surveyed by George Overton, and took a steeper gradient along the ridge at Brusselton, but George Stephenson's second surveyed route took the line to the north of the Brussleton ridge, and so made the gradients on both sides gentler. Overton's original route also then crossed directly eastwards and went through Old Shildon, rather than where it ended up (as New Shildon), as that area at the time was mostly scrub and wetland.

The opening of the S&DR was celebrated at Brusselton permanent steam engine at the line's opening ceremony in September 1825, when people were invited to the engine-house at 8:00 am to have the chance to witness wagons being hauled up and down the incline, before an inaugural locomotive-hauled train then set off from the bottom of the eastern incline towards Stockton. Thirteen coal wagons, (Note: There was a convention that wagons used on waggonways were spelled waggon, and those on railways as wagon. As the wagons used on the embryonic railway were first hauled by horses then by a locomotive, wagon has been used throughout.) and one wagon with flour, were marshalled at the foot of the western side of Brusselton Incline, and then hauled up for spectators to see. Although the line was of a slight downhill gradient between Shildon and Stockton, the two ridges at Brusselton and Etherley, needed to have inclined planes with stationary engines at their summit. Most documents describe the two inclines as being on ridges, but occasionally other names crept in such as Brusselton Bank, and also the spelling of Brusselton varied somewhat. The incline summit was at the 490-foot (150 m) contour.

A Robert Stephenson designed stationary winding engine was installed at the summit of the incline in 1825; the engine was unusual in that it followed the marine engine practice of placing the beams at floor level, and that the drum had been installed vertically, rather than horizontally. (Note: Some doubt that the drum was hung vertically. Certainly by the 1830s a horizontal drum was known to be in use. However, a contemporary watercolour from 1875 shows two drums set low in the roofspace and both hung vertically.) It was rated at 60 horsepower (45 kW) and cost just over £3,482 (equivalent to £358,000 in 2025). It consisted of two cylinders, each producing 30 horsepower (22 kW) with a condensing engine taking steam from two boilers. The winding drum of this engine was housed in a specially designed engine house, with the drum-housing set above the line, which passed through the building underneath the winding drum. Workers were employed at the engine house to ensure that the rope coiled evenly around the drum when winding was in operation. (Note: Most reports detail that the worker in question used a crowbar to guide the rope onto the drum, but they do not explain exactly how this operation worked.) Wagons could ascend either incline in a matter of minutes, and during an era before signalling, a tall signal post was used to indicate when wagons were ready to be hauled up from the bottom of the inclines, and for this, a telescope was installed next to the seat of the winchman/operator. However, during misty/foggy days, a system of wires was used, but it seems that the exact working of this system is unknown. The rails on the section west of Shildon up the incline were laid on stone blocks so that wagons could be pulled along the line by horses without sleepers getting in their way. Whilst the inclines used rope haulage, the near-level section between them over the River Gaunless, had horse haulage rather than locomotives. Initially, the ropes used were made of twisted hemp, but wire ropes were used at Brusselton after 1841 with their successful use being pioneered on the Brandling Junction Railway.

The stone blocks used for sleepers weighed around 75 pounds (34 kg) each, as this was the amount of weight one worker could lift, thereby allowing the company to only employ one man rather than two to lift potentially heavier blocks. These stones were fitted with chairs (iron brackets which held the rails) with two nails. Due to the original 1825 blocks and rails being unable to bear the weight of loaded coal wagons, most of the blocks were replaced with heavier ones in the 1830s, and these used four nails to affix the chairs. Most of the original sandstone blocks came from quarries around Brusselton and Etherley, though wooden sleepers were used between Darlington and the end of the line at Stockton, as these were seen as being more cost efficient than transporting the blocks across the length of the as yet unfinished railway.

The gradient from Shildon up to Brusselton was 1-in-30, and from the incline top down to West Auckland was 1-in-33, though some accounts claim both inclines were 1-in-33. The west bank (Auckland to Brusselton) was 1,851 yards (1,693 m) long and ascended 450 feet (140 m), and the east bank, (Brusselton to Shildon), was 825 yards (754 m) long and was 90 feet (27 m) from Shildon to Brusselton. The weighing machine for the carriage of goods past Brusselton was at the bottom of the east bank near Shildon. This function was kept under the control of the Stockton and Darlington Railway, but the working of the incline was contracted out to a local man who worked the incline at a rate of a farthing per ton of goods carried, with company guaranteeing at least 120,000 tonnes (130,000 tons) would be routed over the incline annually. The first ropes used at the incline came from John Grimshaw who was based at Bishopwearmouth, and cost over £185 (equivalent to £15,000 in 2025) on delivery. As new, the rope was 1,864 yards (1,704 m) long, 13 yards (12 m) longer than the west incline, but by the time it was life expired (c. 1831) it had stretched out an extra 600 feet (180 m). The boiler for the steam engine measured 20 feet (6.1 m) by 8 feet (2.4 m), and required a steady supply of coal and water. A reservoir was dug behind the railway houses on the south side of the incline top, and it is still extant today.

In 1826, the engine was replaced by one that had been designed by Timothy Hackworth; the newer engine had two drums, with the diameter of each drum being in proportion to the length of the inclines (and their respective ropes), so the westward incline had a larger drum. This allowed the simultaneous winding of two westward, or two eastward trains; whilst a train was ascending from Shildon, one could also be lowered down the western incline towards West Auckland. Yet again, the engine was replaced in 1831, by one designed by R. W. Hawthorn of Newcastle upon Tyne. Initially, this was fitted with one drum which had a diameter of 10 feet (3 m), but by the time it was offered for sale, it was listed as having two "rope rolls" of differing diameters. The greatest amount of goods carried in one day over the incline was 2,120 tonnes (2,340 tons) on 6 September 1839.

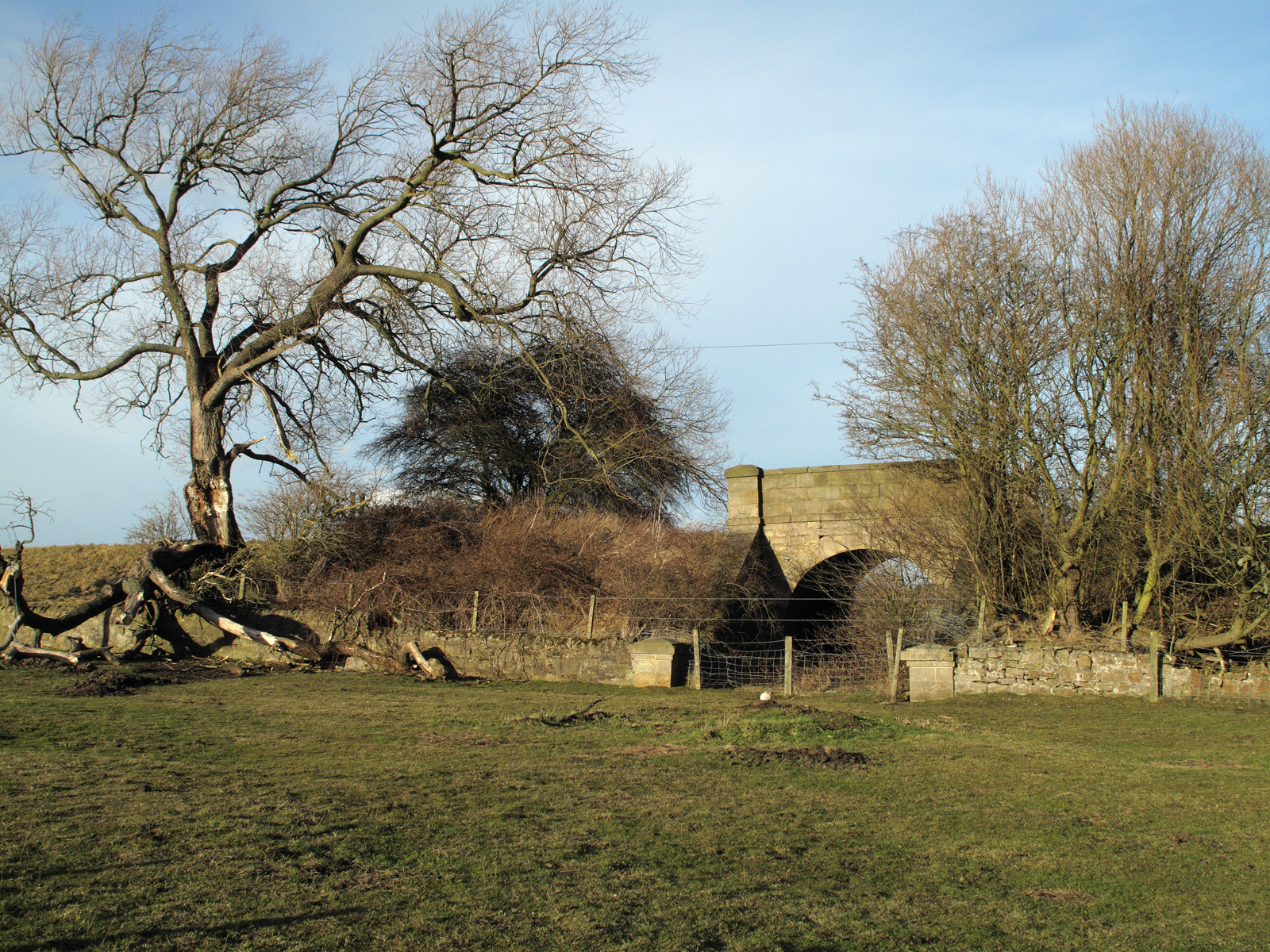
Brusselton accommodation bridge

Between 1832 and 1833, two accommodation bridges were built to the west of the incline top. These were not in the original plan of the S&DR from 1825, but an increase in traffic along the incline led to the bridges being built for the benefit of the landowner as the level crossings the bridges superseded were hard to use with an increased level of traffic.

In the early 1850s, the company decided to build a diversionary line from Shildon to the Auckland area, as the coal traffic had increased due to the opening of the blast furnaces on Teesside. The line through Shildon had been opened out northwards by the building of Shildon Tunnel in 1842, but the Brusselton Incline was still needed to enable trains from the Haggerleases Branch to access the rest of the network. This diversionary line opened on 13 September 1856, and the Brusselton incline ceased to be used for freight, but passenger services still traversed the incline until 13 October 1858. In July 1859, the Darlington & Stockton Times carried an advert stating that the S&DR were selling seven stationary engines, the one from Brusselton being among them. Apart from the old Etherley engine, the other six were re-offered for sale in May 1864, there being seemingly no demand for stationary engines at that time.

Even though it was last used for passengers in 1858, the rails up the incline from Shildon were left in situ well into the LNER days, to allow for firewood and coal deliveries to the former S&DR houses built at Brussleton bank. A small community had developed at Brusselton Bank consisting of 50 houses; 42 on the north side, and eight on the south side, with the railway line running in between the houses. (Note: The north side of terraced houses was demolished in 1971.) The engine house, the boiler house and chimney were converted into private dwellings, and the stone posts and fishbelly rails were taken away piecemeal, usually for museums. Many of the former stone blocks which the rails were attached to instead of sleepers, were re-used at Stockton pier and in the sea wall at Saltburn-by-the-Sea.

The incline was used by the stationary engine to move traffic up and down, but there is one incidence of an S&DR locomotive using the line up from Shildon to the top of Brusselton bank. In 1841, No. 3 Black Diamond, was used to shunt wagons up and down the line after an overhaul and a rebuild of the engine.

== Heritage ==
With most engine houses on inclines being superseded, and demolished, the early conversion of the original S&DR engine house at Brusselton means that it is believed to be the oldest extant example of an incline engine house in existence. It still retains an S&DR property plate - H1. The entire incline is believed to be the first occurrence of a stationary steam engine being used to move wagons up and down both sides of an incline, and was designated as a scheduled monument in February 2023. Besides the incline itself, several structures associated with incline are listed with Historic England;

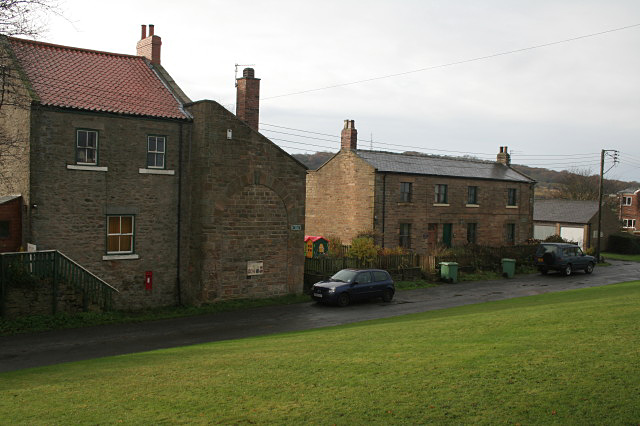
Brusselton Incline Top

- The western portion of the incline into the Gaunless valley is a scheduled monument
- Number 1 old engine house
- Number 2 old engine house
- Numbers 3 & 4 old engine houses
- Brusselton accommodation bridge

The road bridge at the summit which carried the local road beneath the railway was demolished in 1954 to make the road wider, but the accommodation bridge immediately to the west, built to enable the landowner to get to both sides of the line, is still extant, and part of the heritage trail. Pevsner describes the bridge as being "..unpretentious, but beautifully executed with pentagonal voussoirs." The formation of the incline was breached on the eastern side in 1989 by the opening of the A6072 Shildon bypass. The reservoir at the summit house is still extant, and it was dedicated as a nature reserve in July 1988 jointly by Shildon Town Council and Durham County Council.

== Accidents and incidents ==
- 1831 – during an official inspection of the new winding engine, a party of officials were descending the east incline when the rope snapped. Most were able to jump free, apart from Mr Kitching, whose weight, 18 stone (250 lb; 110 kg), prevented him from being as "agile" as the others. A party of workmen had seen the rope snap, and jumped aboard to apply the brakes.
- February 1831 - a Thomas Johnson was killed by a wagon on the incline, but the company report does not specify any details.
- 1834 - a passenger travelling along the incline during night time gashed his head on the winding house drum assembly. The guard of the train was later given an official warning by the company for "not providing any light during the hours of darkness."
- 29 April 1835 – the rope snapped on a train ascending the west bank of the incline (from West Auckland). The cow, a spiked device which travelled behind (or in front of) the wagons, prevented the train from running away and derailing.

== See also ==
- Beckhole Incline
- Brandling Junction Railway
