= Phoenix Row =

Hamlet in County Durham, England

Coordinates: 54.659°N 1.743°W

- Location within County Durham
- OS grid reference: NZ166293
- Unitary authority: County Durham
- Ceremonial county: County Durham
- Region: North East
- Country: England
- Sovereign state: United Kingdom
- Post town: Darlington
- Postcode district: DL14
- Police: Durham
- Fire: County Durham and Darlington
- Ambulance: North East

Phoenix Row incorporating Belts Gill and Softley Dene Farm (formerly Glebe Farm) is a hamlet of about 30 houses in County Durham, in England. It is situated half a mile north of Low Etherley and 2.5 miles west of Bishop Auckland.

== Etherley Incline Railway ==
The hamlet is built on part of the site of the former Etherley Incline Railway, opened in 1825. Initial distribution of coal from the Witton Park Colliery was undertaken by horse and cart, but due to the volumes of coal extracted and cost of distribution, a new method of transport was required. George Stephenson was contracted to build a suitable railway to bring the coal down from the hills, and constructed the Etherley Incline Railway with iron rails held on stone blocks. A stationary beam engine controlled the descent of wagons that ran from the colliery to the River Gaunless. Horses then pulled the wagons to the foot of the Brusselton Incline, which descended into Shildon. From here, the Stockton and Darlington Railway transported it to Newport on the River Tees.

The Etherley Incline closed in 1843, and today it is designated by English Heritage as an ancient monument, and as such is protected.

== History ==
Phoenix Row was built in the 1840s, originally of local sandstone, Stobart brick and red pantiles to house families of miners and farmworkers. In the 1861 Census it is "Venture Row". Nearby Witton Park Ironworks also provided some employment until its closure. The people of Phoenix Row built their own Methodist chapel (now a private house) and they had a cricket team which played at the New Inn Fields. Phoenix Row's bracing climate was credited in the local press for breeding tall, strong sportsmen - "sturdy six-footers". At one time the majority of the houses in the hamlet were occupied by members of just three families - Watson, Gray and Stubbs - and their in-laws.

In the 1960s Phoenix Row was threatened with the dreaded Category "D" notice, a death sentence for many post-industrial County Durham mining communities. However the determined villagers fought the Category "D" notice tooth and nail. Showing remarkable community spirit, they united under the banner of P.R.I.D.E. (the Phoenix Row Improvement & Development Effort) and succeeded in getting the Category D threat lifted, modernising their homes and saving their village for future generations.
