= Shildon railway station =

Railway station in County Durham, England

Shildon
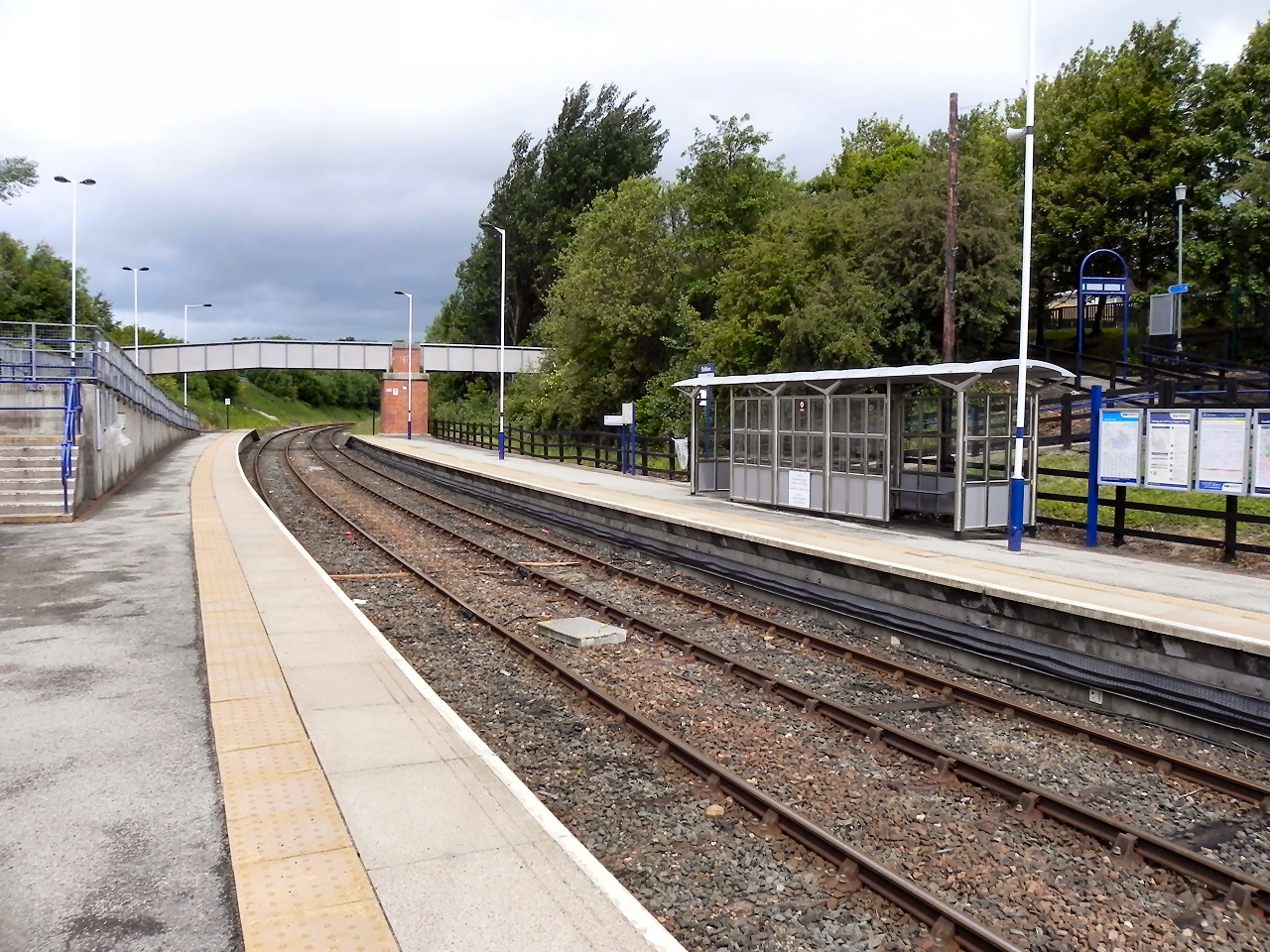

General information
- Location: Shildon, County Durham; England
- Coordinates: 54°37′34″N 1°38′12″W
- Grid reference: NZ235257
- Owner: Network Rail
- Manager: Northern Trains
- Platforms: 2
- Tracks: 2

Other information
- Station code: SHD
- Classification: DfT category F1

History
- Original company: Stockton and Darlington Railway
- Pre-grouping: North Eastern Railway
- Post-grouping: London and North Eastern Railway; British Rail (North Eastern Region)

Key dates
- 27 September 1825: Opened

Passengers
- 2021/22: ▲56,818
- 2022/23: ▲56,968
- 2023/24: ▼54,624
- 2024/25: ▲60,288
- 2025/26: ▲67,824
Location
- Location within County Durham
Notes
- Passenger statistics from the Office of Rail and Road

Shildon is a railway station serving the town of Shildon in County Durham, England on the Tees Valley Line, between Bishop Auckland and Saltburn via Darlington. The station is situated 9 miles 8 chains (14.6 km) north-west of Darlington. It is owned by Network Rail and managed by Northern Trains.

== History ==
The original station was constructed by Timothy Hackworth. It opened on 27 September 1825, under the Stockton and Darlington Railway.

== Facilities ==
Station facilities here have been improved as part of the Tees Valley Metro project. The package for this station included new fully lit waiting shelters, digital CIS displays, renewed station signage and the installation of CCTV. The long-line Public Address system (PA) has been renewed and upgraded with pre-recorded train announcements.

The station is unstaffed and all tickets must be purchased from the ticket vending machine on the platform prior to travel. Step-free access is available to both platforms via ramps, which were added in 2003 when the station was rebuilt in conjunction with the construction of the Shildon Locomotion Museum, sited alongside it on land formerly occupied by the sidings of the Shildon railway works.

The grade II listed manual signal box here controls the immediate station area (including the siding connections into the museum), along with the single track section through Shildon Tunnel to the west and terminus at Bishop Auckland. Bishop Auckland is the junction with the now privately owned and operated Weardale Railway to Stanhope.

== Services ==
As of the May 2021 timetable change, the station is served by an hourly service between Saltburn and Bishop Auckland via Darlington. All services are operated by Northern Trains.

Rolling stock used: Class 156 Super Sprinter and Class 158 Express Sprinter

Preceding station	National Rail	Following station
Newton Aycliffe	Northern Trains; Tees Valley line	Bishop Auckland
	Historical railways	
Aycliffe Lane	North Eastern Railway; Stockton and Darlington Railway	South Church
Aycliffe Lane	North Eastern Railway; Stockton and Darlington Railway	West Auckland
	Historical railways	
Simpasture	North Eastern Railway: Clarence Railway (Simpasture Branch)	Terminus
Stillington	North Eastern Railway: Clarence Railway	Terminus
