= West Auckland, County Durham =

Village in County Durham, England

Coordinates: 54.6318°N 1.721°W

West Auckland
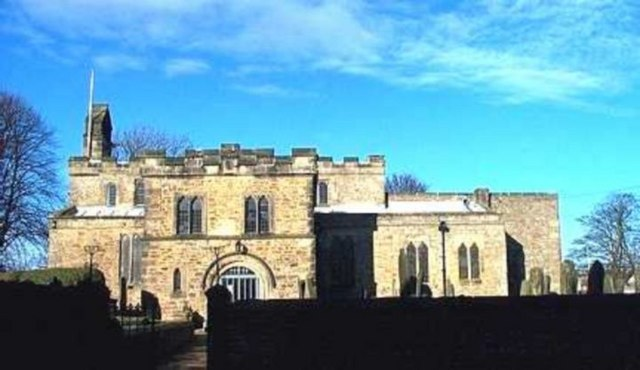

- Location within County Durham
- Population: 8,509 (2011.Ward)
- OS grid reference: NZ180263
- Civil parish: West Auckland
- Unitary authority: County Durham
- Ceremonial county: Durham
- Region: North East
- Country: England
- Sovereign state: United Kingdom
- Post town: BISHOP AUCKLAND
- Postcode district: DL14
- Dialling code: 01388
- Police: Durham
- Fire: County Durham and Darlington
- Ambulance: North East
- UK Parliament: Bishop Auckland

West Auckland (/ˈɔːk.lənd/ AWK-lənd) is a village and civil parish in County Durham, England, to the west of Bishop Auckland on the A688 road. It is reputed to have one of the largest village greens in the country, lined with 17th- and 18th-century buildings. In 2021 it had a population of 3113.

== History ==
It is not known exactly when West Auckland was first inhabited, but there is evidence of West Auckland in the history of St. Cuthbert in the 11th century. The Boldon Book in 1183 showed that at that time West Auckland was inhabited by a number of serfs who were part of the tenantry of the Bishop of Durham, Hugh de Puiset, the first of the Prince Bishops. The creation of a church dedicated to St. Helen in the 13th century in Auckland West heralded the beginning of a separate community in what later became known as St. Helen Auckland.

After the opening of the Stockton and Darlington Railway in 1825, the search for coal escalated dramatically in the West Auckland area, and the population increased as a consequence with the promise of employment. By the turn of the 20th century, West Auckland colliery employed 620 men. The colliery closed in July 1967.

On 1 April 2003 West Auckland became a civil parish.

== West Auckland & the World Cup ==
West Auckland Town F.C. is famously but erroneously named the 'Home of the First World Cup', as its football team were the winners of the Sir Thomas Lipton Trophy, one of the first international footballing competitions, in its two initial years (1909 and 1911) and were therefore, by the rules of the competition, awarded the trophy to keep in perpetuity.

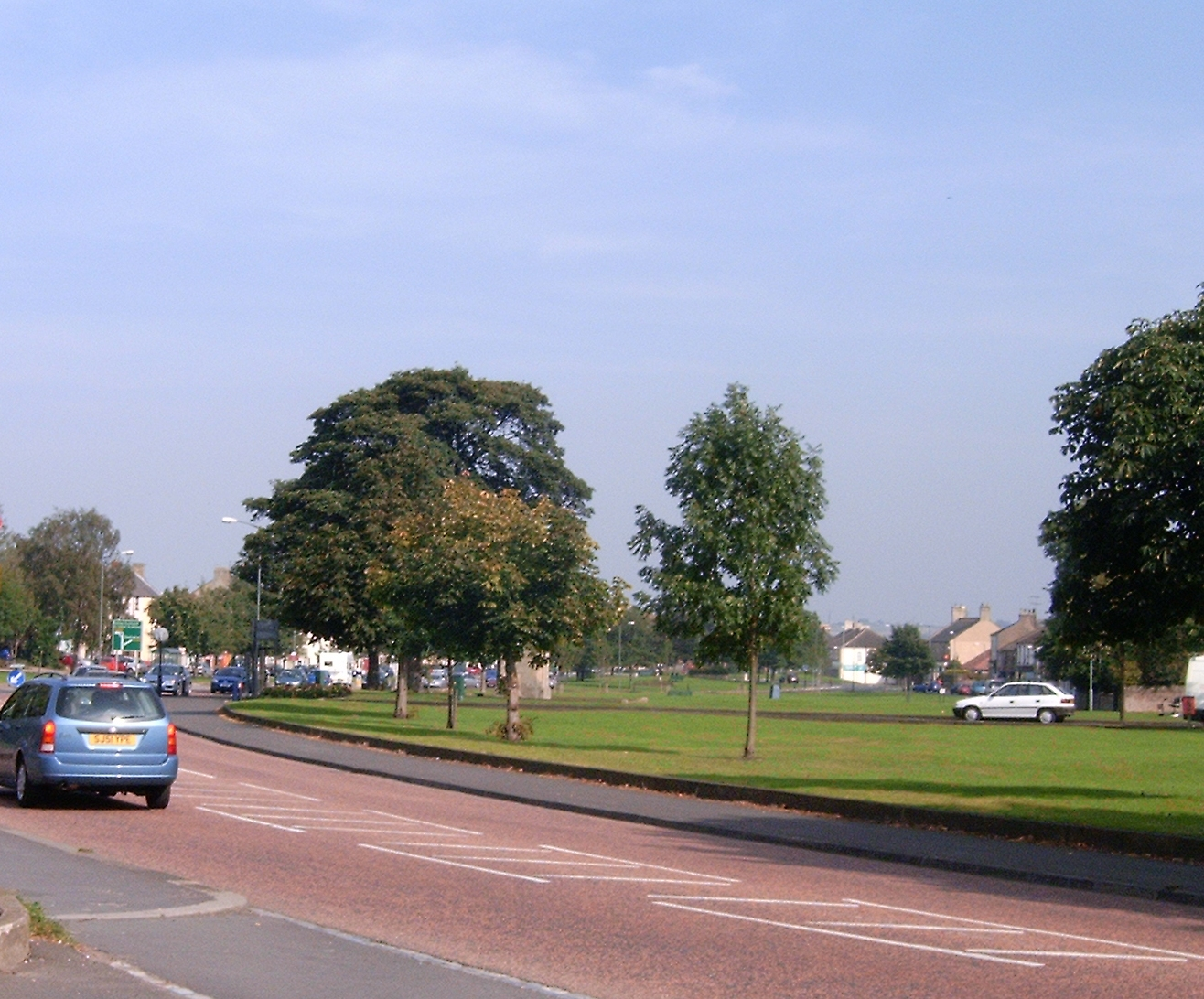
West Auckland (2006)

The Trophy was initiated by businessman and sporting enthusiast Sir Thomas Lipton, who wished to see a competition between the leading football clubs of Europe. The football associations of Italy, Germany and Switzerland duly complied. The often told story was that the Football Association of England refused to nominate a club and Woolwich Arsenal F.C., addressing it to W.A. A.F.C. was approached. The unspecific address caused the letter to be sent to the wrong team, West Auckland A.F.C, and thus the eclectic group of coal miners pawned their belongings and duly made the journey to Turin. However recent research shows this to be incorrect. Many of the players paid out of their own pocket and lost a week's wages to do so.

They beat Stuttgarter Sportfreunde in the semi-finals 2–0; in the final, on 12 April 1909, West Auckland faced Swiss side FC Winterthur and beat them 2–0 as well to take the trophy.

Two years later, West Auckland returned, and after beating FC Zürich 2–0, won 6–1 in the final over future Italian giants Juventus.

This story was made into a TV film in 1982 called The World Cup: A Captain's Tale.

=== The Lost Trophy ===
The club was forced to pawn the trophy to the landlady of the local hotel on their return because of financial problems. It remained with her family until 1960 when a village appeal raised money to return the cup to the club. The cup was then stolen in 1994 and despite the efforts of the police and a £2,000 reward it was never found. An exact replica of the cup now stands in a more secure cabinet in the West Auckland Working Men's Club.

== Notable people ==
- Wally Akers b.1917, forward for Bournemouth & Boscombe Athletic and Gillingham
- Tom Alderson b.1909, forward for Darlington and other clubs
- Ken Hardwick b.1924, goalkeeper for Doncaster Rovers and Scunthorpe United
- Billy Woodward b.1907, forward for Tranmere Rovers
- Dave Thomas b. 1950, winger for a number of top flight English clubs and the England national football team

West Auckland was the home of the infamous serial killer Mary Ann Cotton.

It is also where one will find The Manor House Hotel, reputed to have been one of King Henry VIII's hunting lodges and former family home to the Eden family. William Eden, 1st Baron Auckland took the village for his title in 1789, as did his son, George, who was created Earl of Auckland in 1839. It is thought that the trees to be found outside the hotel were planted to commemorate a visit by the King. Originally seven in number, two were felled to make way for road developments.

== Eponyms ==
Several notable locations have been named for West Auckland via the nobility whose titles were derived from it.

Places:

- Auckland, the largest city in New Zealand and briefly its capital. Named for George Eden, 1st Earl of Auckland.
- Auckland County, New South Wales, Australia. Also named for George Eden.
- The sub-Antarctic Auckland Islands archipelago, including Auckland Island, its main island. Named for William Eden, 1st Baron Auckland.
- Auckland Park, a suburb of Johannesburg, South Africa. Named for the city of Auckland, New Zealand.
