= Coundon railway station =

Former railway station in England

Coundon
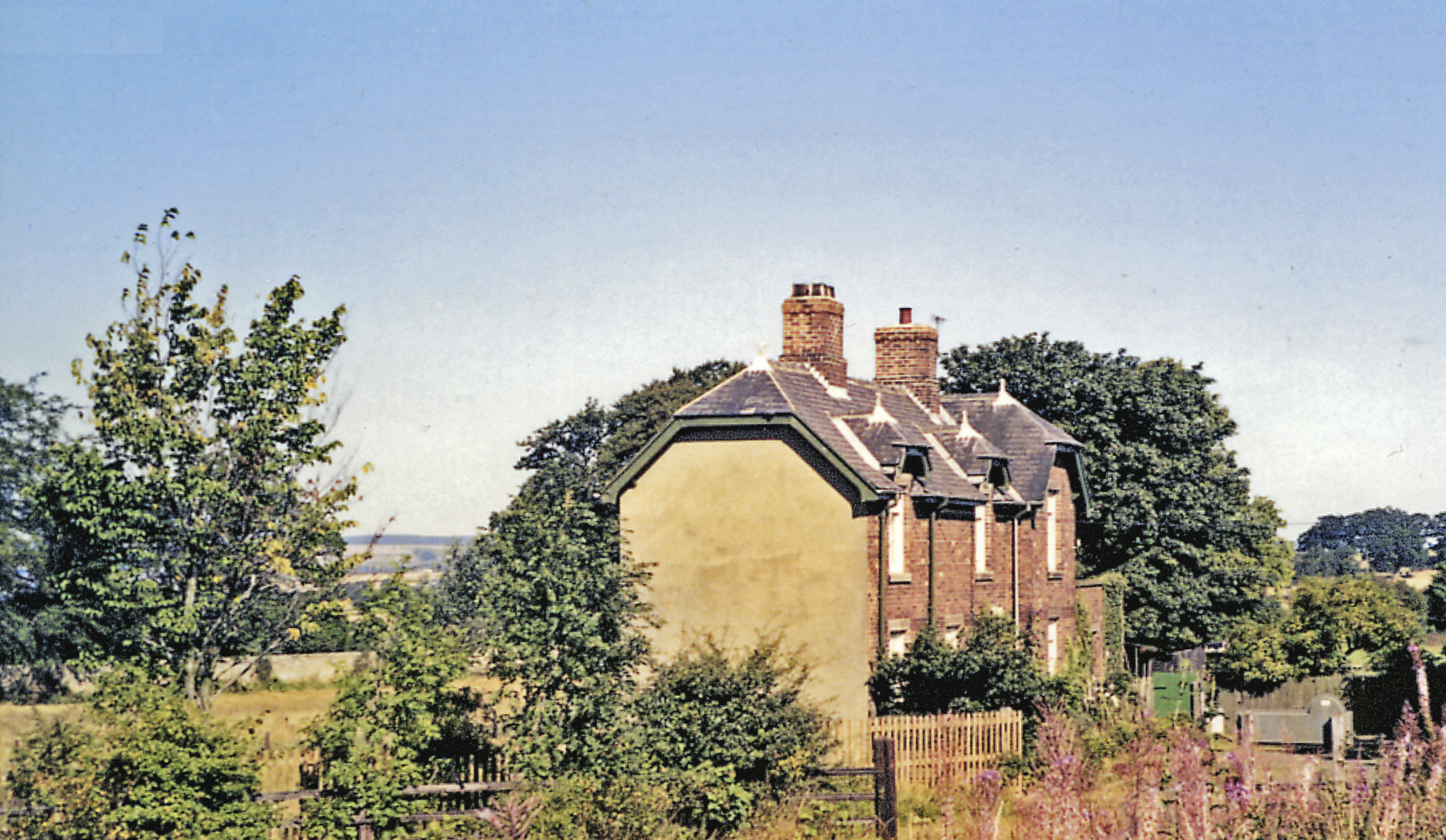
- Site of Coundon station in September 1991

General information
- Location: New Coundon, County Durham; England
- Coordinates: 54.6657°N 1.6493°W
- Grid reference: NZ227300
- Platforms: 1

Other information
- Status: Disused

History
- Original company: North Eastern Railway
- Pre-grouping: North Eastern Railway
- Post-grouping: LNER

Key dates
- 1885: Station opened
- 4 December 1939: Station closed to passengers
- May 1948: Station closed completely
Location

Coundon railway station was a railway station that served the villages of Coundon and New Coundon in County Durham, North East England from 1885 to 1939. It was located on the Bishop Auckland to Ferryhill of the North Eastern Railway (NER), an extension of the earlier Byers Green Branch of the Clarence Railway (CR).

== History ==
The station opened in 1885 as a stop on a new single-track line built by the North Eastern Railway linking Bishop Auckland to Burnhouse Junction, where it joined the earlier Byers Green Branch built by the Clarence Railway (a predecessor of the NER) in 1837. Beyond Burnhouse Junction, passenger trains continued over the former CR route to Ferryhill. In 1925 the station was served by eight trains to Ferryhill and seven to Bishop Auckland. However, due to the rural nature of the western section of this new through route, traffic between Spennymoor and Bishop Auckland was fairly light and as a consequence Coundon station closed to passenger on 4 December 1939 when passenger services on the line west of Spennymoor were withdrawn. The station closed completely in May 1948 though freight continued to pass through its site until September 1956.

The trackbed of the railway through Coundon has been converted into the Auckland Walk, a path for walkers and cyclists.

Preceding station	Historical railways	Following station
Byers Green (3rd station); Line and station closed	North Eastern Railway; Clarence Railway (Byers Green Branch)	Bishop Auckland; Line closed, station open
