= Norton Junction railway station =

Disused railway station in Norton, County Durham

Norton Junction

General information
- Location: Norton, Stockton-on-Tees; England
- Coordinates: 54.5943°N 1.3398°W
- Grid reference: NZ428222
- Platforms: 2

Other information
- Status: Disused

History
- Original company: Clarence Railway
- Pre-grouping: North Eastern Railway

Key dates
- 11 July 1835: Opened
- July 1870: Closed
Location

Norton Junction railway station served the village of Norton, County Durham, England from 1835 to 1870 on the Clarence Railway.

== History ==
The station opened on 11 July 1835 by the Clarence Railway at the junction between its two eastern branches to Port Clarence and North Shore Staithes. The station was poorly located for the village of Norton and so it closed to both passengers and goods traffic in July 1870 by the North Eastern Railway to be replaced by Norton-on-Tees station, a short distance to the east along the Port Clarence branch.

Preceding station	Disused railways	Following station
Stockton (Clarence); Line and station closed	Clarence Railway	Carlton; Line and station closed
