= Coxhoe railway station =

Disused railway station in Coxhoe, County Durham

Coxhoe
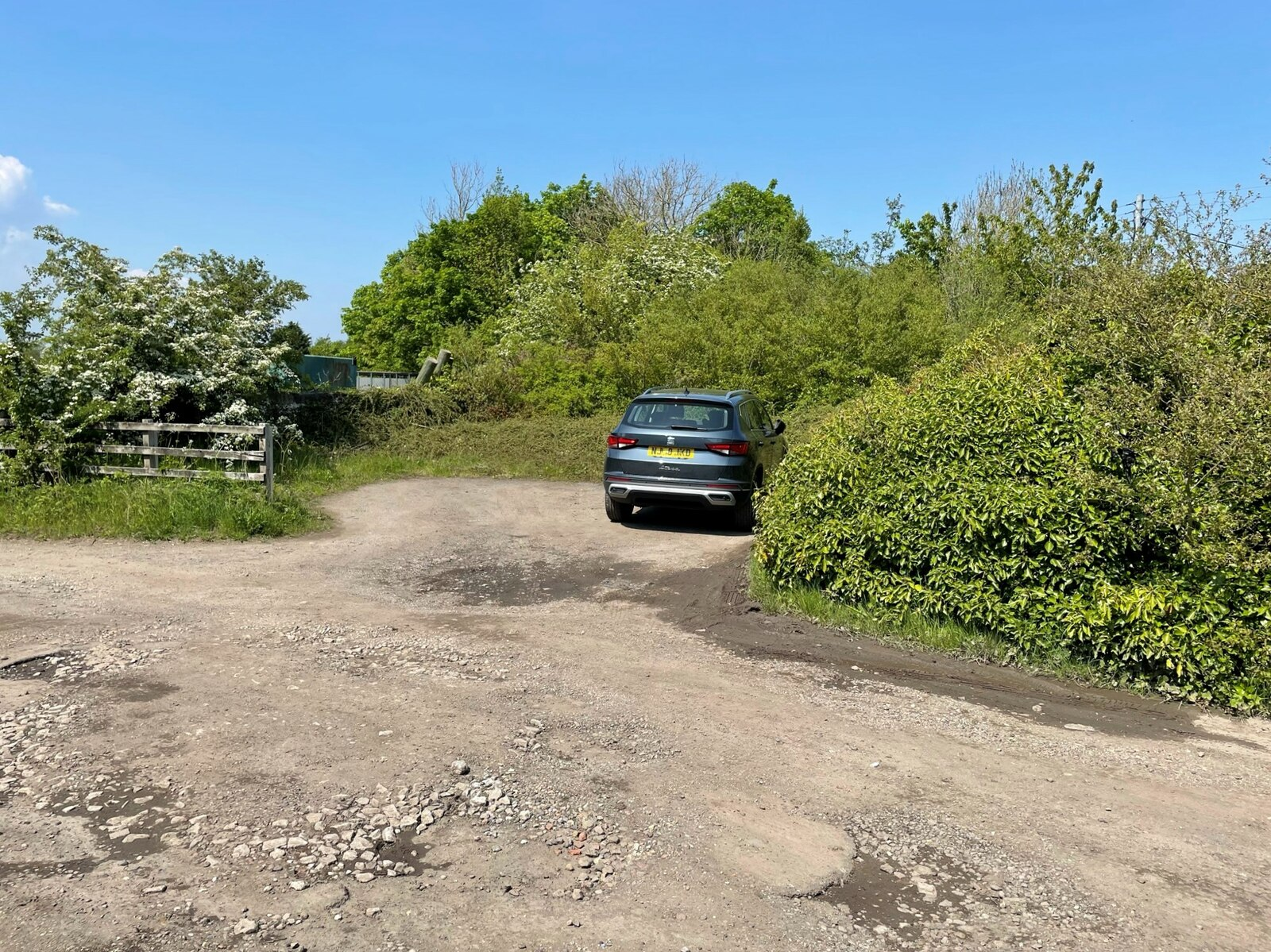
- The site of the station in 2021

General information
- Location: Coxhoe, County Durham; England
- Coordinates: 54.7198°N 1.5084°W
- Grid reference: NZ317362
- Platforms: 1

Other information
- Status: Disused

History
- Original company: Clarence Railway
- Pre-grouping: North Eastern Railway
- Post-grouping: London and North Eastern Railway; British Rail (North Eastern)

Key dates
- 20 June 1838: Opened
- 1 April 1902: Closed to passengers
- 3 October 1966: Closed completely
Location

Coxhoe railway station served the village of Coxhoe, County Durham, England from 1838 to 1902 on the Coxhoe branch of the Clarence Railway.

== History ==
The station opened on 20 June 1838 by the Clarence Railway. The station was situated west of the level crossing near Station Road between Grange Farm and Low House Farm. There were two trains to Stockton via Ferryhill and Sedgefield that departed at 8:40am and 4:40pm. In the opposite direction trains arrived from Stockton at 8:30am and 4:35pm. The station was one of two to have served Coxhoe, the other being Coxhoe Bridge on the Great North of England, Clarence and Hartlepool Junction Railway, though the former CR station was located far closer to the town centre than that of the GNEC&HJR. The station closed to passengers on 1 April 1902 but the station remained open to goods traffic until 3 October 1966 when it ceased.

Preceding station	Disused railways	Following station
Ferryhill; Line and station closed	Clarence Railway; Coxhoe Branch	Terminus
