= Hartlepool railway station (Hartlepool Dock and Railway) =

Former railway station in England

Hartlepool
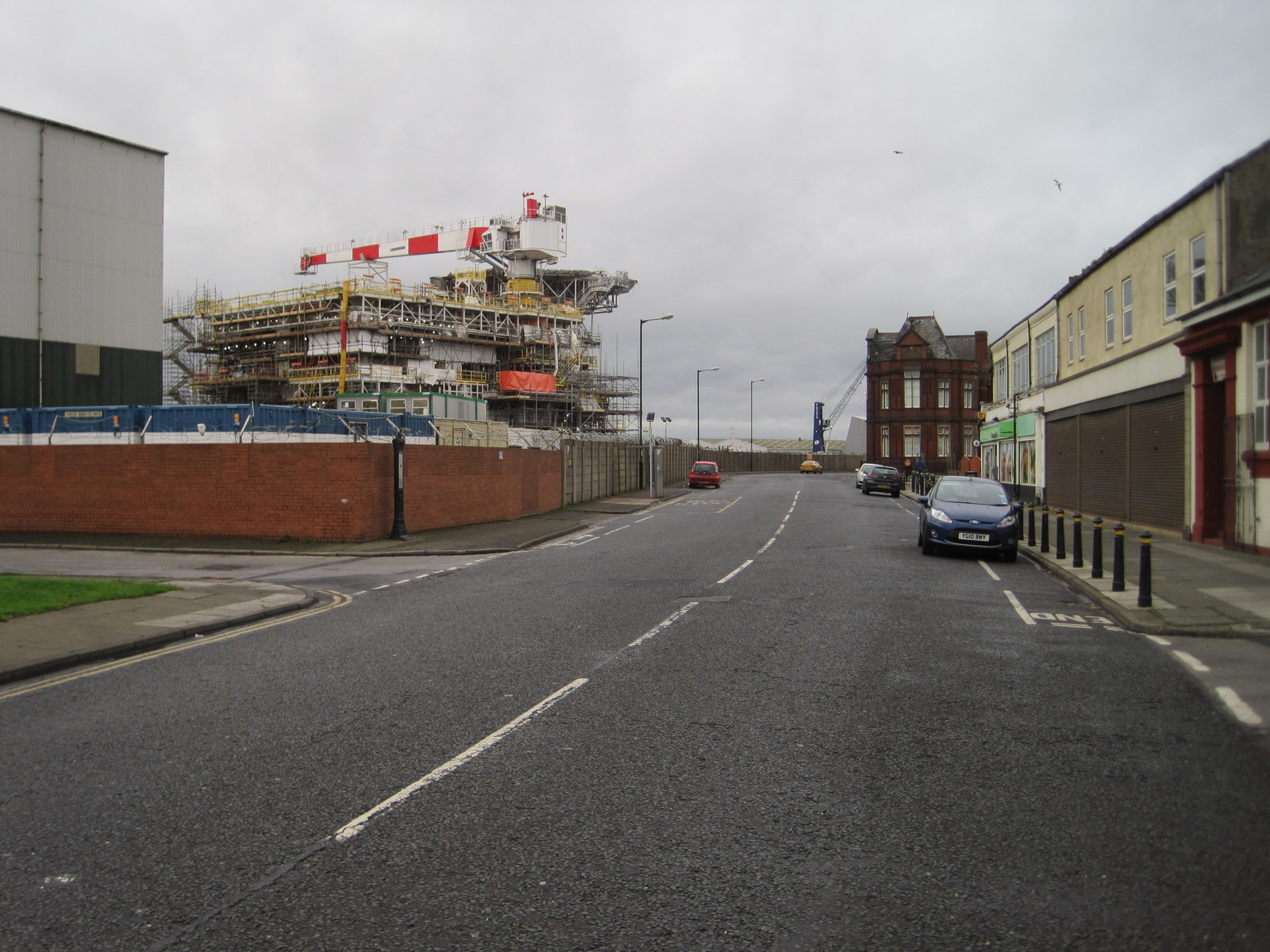
- The site of the second station in January 2015

General information
- Location: Headland, Hartlepool; England
- Coordinates: 54.6987°N 1.1877°W
- Platforms: 1

Other information
- Status: Disused

History
- Original company: Hartlepool Dock and Railway
- Pre-grouping: North Eastern Railway
- Post-grouping: LNER; British Rail (North Eastern)

Key dates
- 1839: First station opened
- 16 November 1878: First station replaced by second
- 16 June 1947: Second station closed to regular passenger services
- 23 March 1964: Second station closed completely
Location

Hartlepool railway station was a railway station that served the Headland area of Hartlepool in the ceremonial county of Durham, North East England. Though originally built as the coastal terminus of the Hartlepool Dock and Railway in 1839, for most of its life the station was the terminus of a shuttle service from the town's main station in West Hartlepool.

== History ==
Though the first mineral train along the HD&R reached Hartlepool on 1 January 1835, the first passenger station in Hartlepool was not opened until 1839. Facilities at this first station were initially housed in the hull of a grounded ship before a more permanent building was provided, close to Commercial Street. From 1845, the HD&R leased the Great North of England, Clarence and Hartlepool Junction Railway which had opened a line from a junction with the HD&R at Wingate to Ferryhill six years earlier. However just a year after the HD&R leased the GNEC&HJR, both companies were leased by the newly formed York and Newcastle Railway, before being amalgamated into its successor, the York, Newcastle and Berwick Railway, on 22 July 1848. Passengers from Hartlepool were first carried over the GNEC&HJR in 1846.

The York, Newcastle and Berwick Railway was amalgamated with other companies to form the North Eastern Railway in 1854 and in 1877 the NER constructed a line linking the former HD&R directly to the former Stockton and Hartlepool Railway in West Hartlepool. As part of the rationalisation of the rail network around Hartlepool, the NER opened a new terminus at Hartlepool, west of the original station, on 16 November 1878 and a new through station at West Hartlepool two years later. Following the opening of the new station, the original one was converted into a goods shed. The growth of West Hartlepool, combined with the decline of "old" Hartlepool led to the diversion of passenger services from the former HD&R and GNEC&HJR lines into West Hartlepool station, leaving Hartlepool as the terminus of a shuttle service between the two towns.

The opening of a parallel steam tramway in 1884, and its later conversion to electric traction in 1899, introduced direct competition to this shuttle service. Hoping to emulate the success of the then recently launched Tyneside Electrics system, the NER first launched their experimental petrol electric autocars on the Hartlepool-West Hartlepool shuttle service in August 1904, hoping that they could provide a frequent (10-minute frequency) 5-minute journey time service capable of drawing back passengers from the tramway. However, only one unit actually saw service on this route and, after further trials on the Port Clarence Branch in early 1905, this unit was transferred to Scarborough later that year. Nonetheless, even after the NER became part of the London and North Eastern Railway in the 1923 grouping, the shuttle continued to attempt to compete with trams and busses. In 1925, the LNER shuttle service consisted of 49 trains per day but by 1939 it had declined to 38, with services then normally operated by LNER Sentinel steam railcars.

However, wartime economy measures led to this service being reduced to just four trains each way from 2 October 1939, a service level which was maintained until public passenger services were withdrawn on 16 June 1947. Even so, the station still continued to handle services for school children until 23 March 1964.

Preceding station	Historical railways	Following station
Terminus	North Eastern Railway; Hartlepool Dock & Railway	Hart; Line and station closed
West Hartlepool; Line closed, station open	London and North Eastern Railway; West Hartlepool-Hartlepool	Terminus
