= Byers Green railway station =

Disused railway station in England

Byers Green
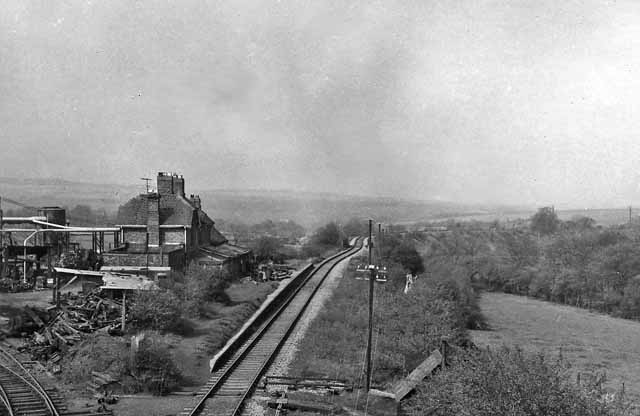
- The third Byers Green station in 1965.

General information
- Location: Byers Green, County Durham; England
- Coordinates: 54.690274°N 1.648754°W
- Platforms: 1

Other information
- Status: Disused

History
- Original company: Clarence Railway
- Pre-grouping: North Eastern Railway
- Post-grouping: London and North Eastern Railway

Key dates
- 1845: First station opened
- 1867: First station closed to passengers
- 1878: Second station opened on site of Tod Hills station
- 1885: Third station replaces second station
- 4 December 1939: Third station closed to passengers
- 2 June 1958: Third station closed completely
Location

Byers Green railway station was one of three railway stations that served in the village of Byers Green in County Durham, Northeast England.

== History ==
The Clarence Railway opened its Byers Green branch from Ferryhill in 1837. Passengers were first carried from 1845, initially starting at Tod Hills (or Todhills) to the west, but services were cut back to Byers Green from 1848. The service was again extended to Tod Hills in 1865, before the passenger service was withdrawn on the branch in 1867.

The service was restored in 1878, when a new Byers Green station opened at the site of the original Tod Hills station. In 1885 a new line opened from Burnhouse Junction, to the east of Byers Green station, to Bishop Auckland and a new station opened on this line. This station closed to passengers on 4 December 1939 and goods on 2 June 1958.

The Clarence Railway was leased to the Stockton and Hartlepool Railway for 21 years from 1844, and a permanent lease was negotiated from 1851. The Clarence Railway became part of the West Hartlepool Harbour and Railway in 1853, which became part of the larger North Eastern Railway in 1865.

The trackbed of the railway has been converted into the Auckland Way, a path for walkers and cyclists.

Preceding station	Historical railways	Following station
Spennymoor; Line and station closed	Clarence Railway; Byers Green Branch; 1845-1867	Tod Hills; Line and station closed
Spennymoor; Line and station closed	North Eastern Railway; Clarence Railway (Byers Green Branch); 1885-1939	Coundon; Line and station closed
