= Redmarshall railway station =

Former railway station in County Durham, England

Coordinates: 54.5963°N 1.3843°W

Redmarshall
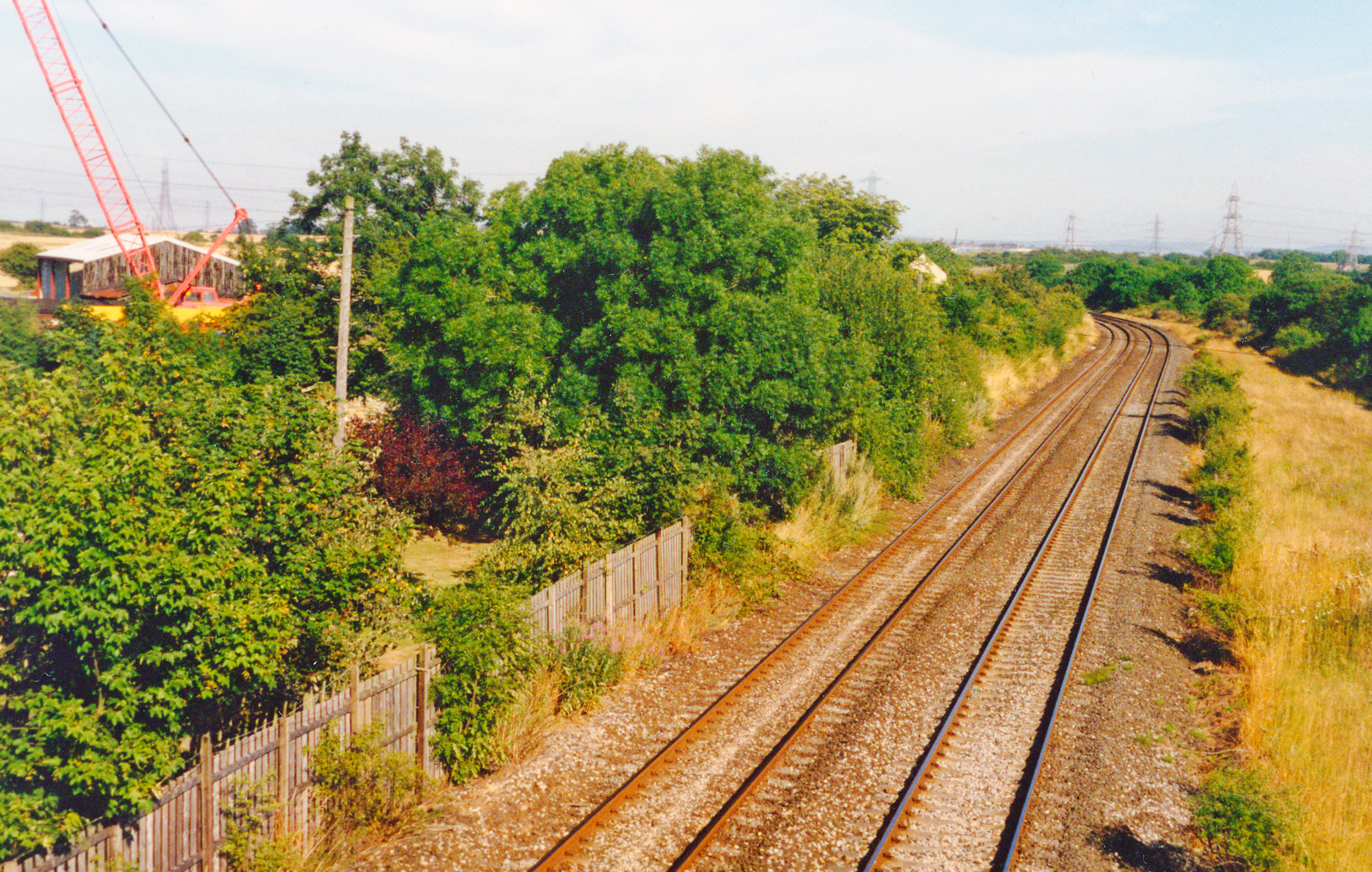
- Site of the former Redmarshall station looking SE along the former Clarence Railway main line towards Stockton. 9 August 1995.

General information
- Location: Carlton, Stockton-on-Tees; England
- Grid reference: NZ398224
- Platforms: 2

Other information
- Status: Disused

History
- Original company: Clarence Railway
- Pre-grouping: North Eastern Railway
- Post-grouping: London and North Eastern Railway

Key dates
- January 1836: Opened as Carlton
- 1 July 1923: Renamed Redmarshall
- 31 March 1952: Closed
Location

Redmarshall railway station was a railway station on the North Eastern Railway, in County Durham, England.

== History ==
The station was opened with a section of the Clarence Railway main line in January 1836. Originally named Carlton, the station was situated between Norton-on-Tees and Stillington. When completed, the main line ran between Haverton Hill and Simpasture, where it joined the Stockton and Darlington Railway. After a series of leases and absorptions, the Clarence Railway eventually became part of the North Eastern Railway (NER) upon the formation of the latter in 1854.

In 1915 the line between Shildon and Newport was electrified. On completion of the work, there were four tracks between Stillington Junction and Carlton West Junction; the southern pair carried the freight trains and were electrified, whilst the northern pair carried the passenger trains and remained steam-worked. At Carlton station, the platforms were only on the northern pair of tracks.

On 1 January 1923 the NER amalgamated with other companies to form the London and North Eastern Railway (LNER). On 1 July 1923 the LNER renamed the station Redmarshall.

The station was closed by British Railways on 31 March 1952, when passenger trains over the route between Middlesbrough and Ferryhill were withdrawn. The line is still in use for freight and occasional diverted passenger trains, but no trace of the station itself remains.

== Notes ==
Preceding station	Historical railways	Following station
Norton-on-Tees; Line open, station closed	North Eastern Railway; Clarence Railway	Stillington; Line open, station closed
Stockton; Line and station open	North Eastern Railway; Clarence Railway	Stillington; Line open, station closed
