= Stillington railway station =

Former railway station in County Durham, England

Stillington
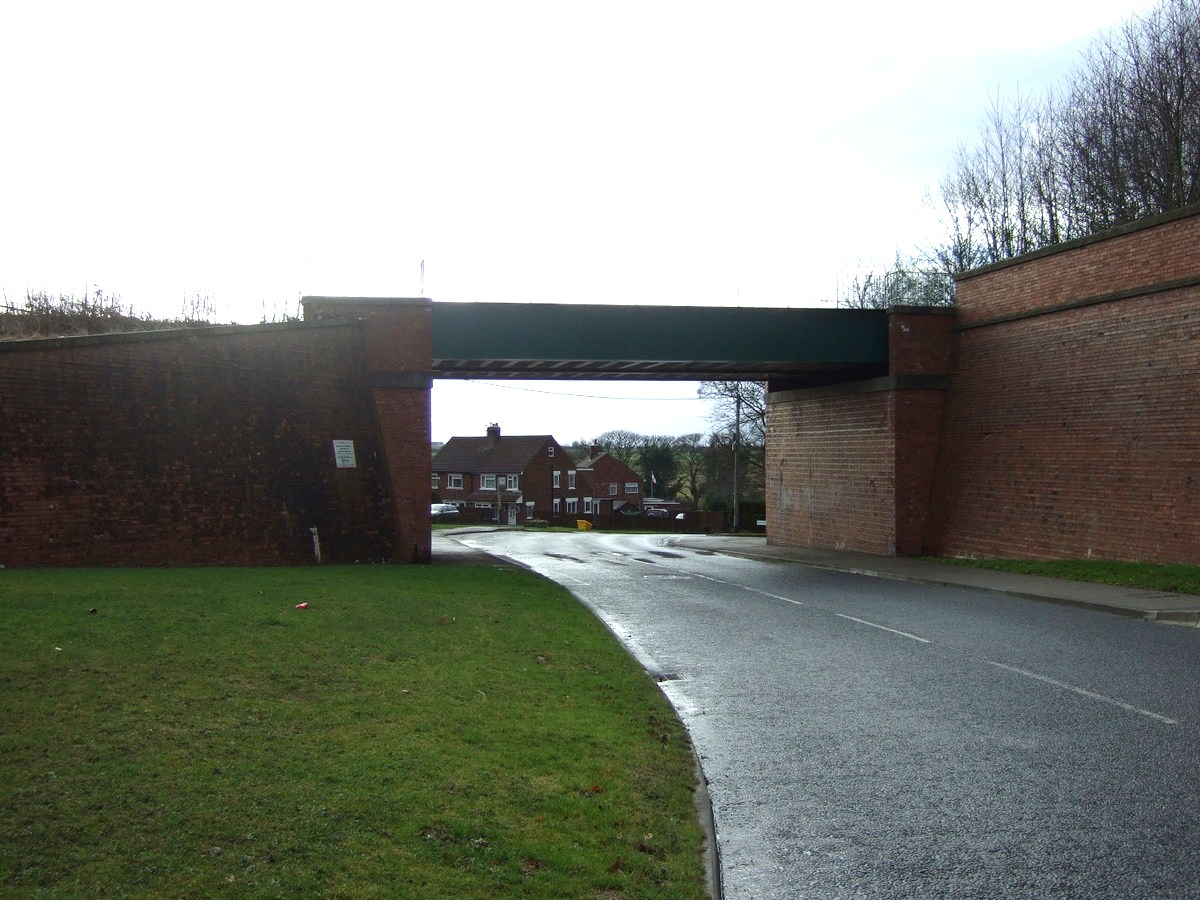
- Railway bridge in Stillington

General information
- Location: Stillington, County Durham; England
- Coordinates: 54°36′21″N 1°25′37″W
- Platforms: 2

Other information
- Status: Disused

History
- Original company: Clarence Railway
- Pre-grouping: North Eastern Railway
- Post-grouping: London & North Eastern Railway

Key dates
- 1879: Opened
- 1880s: Resited
- 29 March 1952: Closed
Location
- Location within County Durham

Stillington railway station was a railway station on the North Eastern Railway, in Stillington, County Durham, England.

== History ==
The station was opened by the Clarence Railway between Shildon and Port Clarence that closed to passengers in 1953, with Stillington closing a year earlier on 29 March 1952, and to all freight between Shildon and Stillington via Newton Aycliffe in 1963. The line remains open for freight only.

Preceding station	Historical railways	Following station
Sedgefield; Line and station closed	North Eastern Railway; Clarence Railway (East Coast Main Line, (Shildon Branch) & (Demons Bridge Branch)	Redmarshall; Line open, station closed
Shildon; Line and station open	North Eastern Railway; Clarence Railway (East Coast Main Line, (Shildon Branch) & (Demons Bridge Branch)	Redmarshall; Line open, station closed
Demons Bridge; Line and station closed	North Eastern Railway; Clarence Railway (East Coast Main Line, (Shildon Branch) & (Demons Bridge Branch)	Redmarshall; Line open, station closed
