= Todhills =

Todhills may refer to the following places in the United Kingdom:

- Todhills, Angus, a location
- Todhills, County Durham
- Todhills, Cumbria
- Todhills rest area, a facility on the M6 motorway in Cumbria, England
