= Byers Green =

Village in County Durham, England

Coordinates: 54.701°N 1.653°W

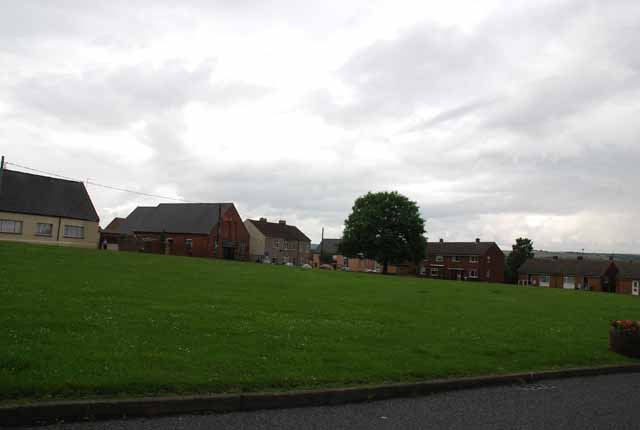
- The village green

- Location within County Durham
- Population: 672
- OS grid reference: NZ223340
- Civil parish: Spennymoor
- Unitary authority: County Durham
- Ceremonial county: Durham
- Region: North East
- Country: England
- Sovereign state: United Kingdom
- Post town: SPENNYMOOR
- Postcode district: DL16
- Dialling code: 01388
- Police: Durham
- Fire: County Durham and Darlington
- Ambulance: North East
- UK Parliament: Newton Aycliffe and Spennymoor

Byers Green is a village in the civil parish of Spennymoor, in the Wear valley, in County Durham, England. It is situated approximately 2 miles from the A688 road, which connects the town of Bishop Auckland to the city of Durham. The village is adjacent to the River Wear and has a population of around 1,200 people and is known for its picturesque countryside and historic landmarks.

The name Byers Green comes from the Old English word byre, which means "cowshed", and the Middle English word grene, which means "village green" or "hamlet". The name translates to "(the green by the) cowsheds". Byers Green was a farming area throughout the medieval period and into the 16th and 17th centuries.

Vinovia or Vinovium was a Roman fort and settlement built around AD 79 situated just over 2 miles to the south-west of Byers Green. The ruins are now known as the Binchester Roman Fort.

One of the most notable landmarks in Byers Green is the Parish Church of St. Peter the Apostle. St Peter's Church built in the 1830s serves the villages of Binchester, Newfield and Byers Green.

The Old Hall, located on the north-east perimeter of Byers Green, has a long history. The origins of the building are difficult to date, but some suggest the yard's small cobbling may be Roman. The broad central stone wall and internal stone arch on the ground floor indicates a pre-1600 structure. The Trotter family were associated with Byers Green Hall since the 15th century, when Roger Trotter was an exchequer tenant at Bires. The family remained in possession until the 1940s. Byers Green Hall was rebuilt several times between the late 16th and early 18th centuries

Thomas Wright, (1711–1786) an 18th-century astronomer, architect, garden designer, mathematician and polymath was born and died in Byers Green Hall (a second large Hall located in the centre of the village to the East of the High Street - now demolished). Wright was educated at King James I Grammar School in nearby Bishop Auckland prior to being apprenticed to a clockmaker in the town. By 1734, after various adventures, Wright had progressed to making a huge working model of the universe (an orrery) for an aristocratic London patron. This set him on his remarkable career that included the first accurate description of the Milky Way. Wright built his observatory, Westerton Tower, on a high ridge near Byers Green and adjacent to the hamlet of Westerton. The Tower is a circular structure, in a Gothic revival style of the 18th century. The Observatory appears in a document of 1744, but does not appear to have been completed until after Wright's death in 1786. A plaque dated 1950 was erected to commemorate the 200th anniversary of his publication "The Original Theory of the Universe" of 1750. Thomas Wright's works can be viewed at Durham University Library.The library has a large collection of Wright's manuscripts, publications, and other materials related to his life and work. The collection is held in the Archives and Special Collections at Durham University Library, Palace Green, Durham DH1 3RN. An online catalog of the collection is available.

Professor Harold Orton, (1898–1975) a noted 20th-century linguist and English dialectologist was also born here. Harold Orton was the son of a schoolmaster at Byers Green and attended King James I Grammar School in Bishop Auckland followed by Merton College, Oxford. His 1933 book The Phonology of a South Durham Dialect, based on the dialect of the area, was re-published by Routledge in 2015.

Sir Percy Cradock, GCMG, (1923–2010) a senior British civil servant, was born in Byers Green. He was educated at Alderman Wraith Grammar School, Spennymoor followed by St John's College, Cambridge, where he read law. Having trained as a barrister Cradock joined the Diplomatic Service and during his career held a number of senior diplomatic posts, including Ambassador to China. Later in his career he was labelled by the media as the 'UK's most senior spy' because he chaired the Joint Intelligence Committee (UK) under Margaret Thatcher's government. Cradock died in London on 22 January 2010, aged 86.

== Transport ==
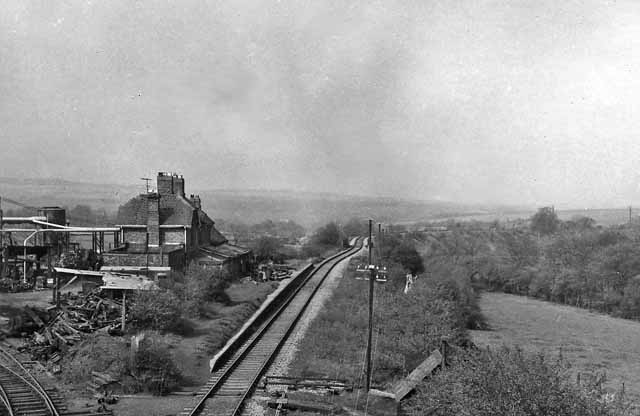
Byers Green station, after closure in May 1965, looking north towards Spennymoor and Ferryhill. Photograph by Ben Brooksbank

Byers Green railway station was opened in 1837 by the Clarence Railway, after it opened its Byers Green branch from Ferryhill in 1837. From 1840 it became a junction station, between the Clarence and the West Durham Railway towards Crook. Passenger services were withdrawn on 4 December 1939, when the passenger service from Ferryhill was cut back to Spennymoor. Goods were handled at Byers Green until 2 June 1958.

Since the line was lifted in the late 1960s, the station buildings have been demolished, but the site is part of the Auckland County walking system.

== Civil parish ==
Byers-Green was formerly a township and chapelry in the parish of Auckland St. Andrew, from 1866 Byers Green was a civil parish in its own right, on 1 April 1937 the parish was abolished to form Spennymoor and Crook and Willington, part also went to Bishop Auckland. In 1931 the parish had a population of 1962.
