= Stockton Norton Road railway station =

Former railway station in Stockton-on-Tees, County Durham, England

Stockton Norton Road
- Map of the Clarence Railway with Stockton Branch

General information
- Location: Stockton-on-Tees, Borough of Stockton-on-Tees, County Durham; England
- Coordinates: 54°34′19″N 1°18′38″W
- Platforms: 2

Other information
- Status: Disused

History
- Original company: Clarence Railway
- Pre-grouping: North Eastern Railway
- Post-grouping: London and North Eastern Railway

Key dates
- 1842: Opened
- 1852: Station Closed
- 1968: Line Closed
Location
- Location within County Durham

Stockton Norton Road railway station was a station on the Clarence Railway's North Shore Branch Line. It served the market town of Stockton-on-Tees in County Durham, England. It opened originally as the station for the Hartlepool and Stockton Railway from 1842 until 1852 when it was replaced by the stations at Stockton North and South. The station continued to be used by workmen's train services for the North Shore Shipyard until the closure of the line in 1968.

== History ==
The station was opened by the Clarence Railway between Norton-on-Tees and North Shore. It closed to passengers in 1852, with the entire North Shore Branch Line ceasing to all traffic in 1968. The line was also connected to Haverton Hill to allow access to Port Clarence from the town. The site is now occupied by an industrial estate.

Preceding station	Historical railways	Following station
Norton-on-Tees; Line and station closed	North Eastern Railway; Clarence Railway (North Shore Branch Line)	Terminus
Haverton Hill; Line and station closed	North Eastern Railway; Clarence Railway (North Shore Branch Line)	Terminus
