= Norton-on-Tees railway station =

Disused railway station in Norton, County Durham

Norton-on-Tees
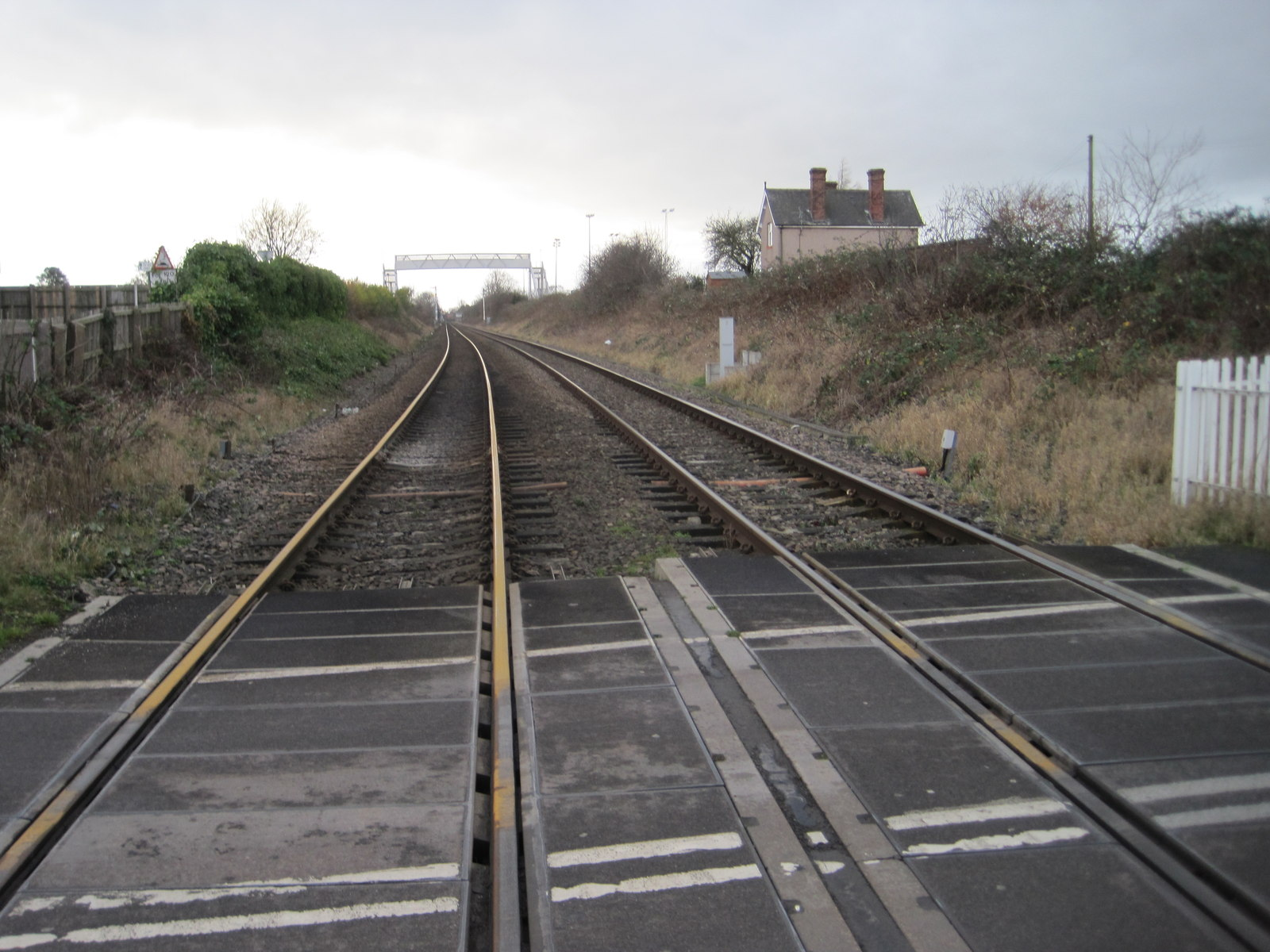
- The station site in 2015

General information
- Location: Norton, Stockton-on-Tees, County Durham, England
- Coordinates: 54.598°N 1.3216°W
- Grid reference: NZ439227
- Platforms: 2

Other information
- Status: Disused

History
- Original company: North Eastern Railway
- Post-grouping: LNER; British Railways (North Eastern)

Key dates
- July 1877: Opened as Norton Junction
- 1 October 1901: Name changed to Norton-on-Tees
- 7 March 1960: Closed
Location

Norton-on-Tees railway station served the town of Norton, County Durham, England from 1877 to 1960, originally on the Port Clarence Branch of the Clarence Railway.

== History ==
The first station to serve the town of Norton-on-Tees (known as Norton Junction) was opened by the Clarence Railway at the junction between their branches to North Shore and Port Clarence on the curve between Norton South & Norton West signal boxes which opened in 1833. However this station was poorly situated for the town it served and so the North Eastern Railway replaced this station with a new one further along the Port Clarence Branch in July 1877. Shortly beyond Billingham-on-Tees station, the next station to the west on the Port Clarence Branch, the former Stockton and Hartlepool Railway branched off the former Clarence Railway route towards West Hartlepool. It was originally called Norton Junction in the Bradshaw timetable but it was renamed to Norton-on-Tees on 1 October 1901. Originally this had been a branch line however, after the North Eastern Railway completed the Durham Coast Line with the opening of the coastal route between Seaham and West Hartlepool in 1905, Norton station became a stop on the new coastal trunk route.

Passenger services on the Clarence route to Port Clarence were cut back to Haverton Hill on 11 September 1939 before being withdrawn completely on 14 June 1954, though trains for workmen continued until November 1961. The station remained a stop on the Durham Coast Line until it closed to both passengers and goods traffic on 7 March 1960. It was subsequently demolished in 1965.

Preceding station	Historical railways	Following station
Stockton-on-Tees; Line and station open	North Eastern Railway; Durham Coast Line	Billingham-on-Tees; Line open; station closed
Redmarshall; Line open; station closed	North Eastern Railway: Clarence Railway; (Port Clarence Branch)	Billingham-on-Tees; Line open; station closed
Stockton Norton Road; Line and station closed	North Eastern Railway: Clarence Railway; (Port Clarence Branch)	Billingham-on-Tees; Line open; station closed
