= Jack Stokoe =

British flying ace of WWII

- Born: 1 February 1920; West Cornforth, County Durham, England
- Died: 2 October 1999 (aged 79)
- Military career
- Allegiance: United Kingdom
- Branch: Royal Air Force
- Service years: 1939–1946
- Rank: Squadron Leader
- Units: No. 603 Squadron; No. 54 Squadron
- Commands: RAF Great Massingham
- Conflicts: Second World War: Battle of Britain; Circus offensive
- Awards: Distinguished Flying Cross

Jack Stokoe, DFC (1 February 1920 – 2 October 1999) was a British flying ace of the Royal Air Force (RAF) during the Second World War. He is credited with the destruction of at least eight aircraft.

From County Durham, Stokoe joined the RAF's Volunteer Reserve (RAFVR) in mid-1939 and was called up to serve in the RAF on the outbreak of the Second World War. After completing his flying training, he was posted to No. 603 Squadron in July 1940 as a sergeant pilot. His first aerial victory was achieved during the Battle of Britain but he was shot down in September and hospitalised for several weeks with burns. Commissioned in early 1941, he was posted to No. 54 Squadron and flew with this unit during the Circus offensive, claiming several more aerial victories. Much of the remainder of his wartime service was spent in instructing and administrative duties. Returning to civilian life after the work he worked for the Kent County Council but also rejoined the RAFVR for a five-year period of service. He died in 1999, aged 79, after suffering a stroke.

== Early life ==
Jack Stokoe was born on 1 February 1920 in West Cornforth, County Durham in England. His father was a miner. After completing his schooling he worked for the Buckinghamshire County Council. He joined the Royal Air Force Volunteer Reserve (RAFVR) in June 1939 to train as a pilot. He carried out his flying training at No. 26 Elementary & Reserve Flying Training School at Oxford Airport. In September he was called up for service in the Royal Air Force (RAF) following the outbreak of the Second World War.

== Second World War ==
After a period of time at the Initial Training Wing at Cambridge learning military drills and practices, Stokoe proceeded to No. 15 Flying Training School at Lossiemouth in late December. His flying course was completed in early June 1940, and he subsequently proceeded to No. 5 Operational Training Unit (OTU) for familiarisation on Supermarine Spitfire fighters. At the end of the month he was posted to No. 263 Squadron but his stay here was brief since it was about to convert to the Westland Whirlwind heavy fighter. On 3 July Stokoe, who had opted to fly single-engined fighters, was posted to No. 603 Squadron and assigned to its 'A' flight.

=== Battle of Britain ===
Stokoe's new squadron, of the Royal Auxiliary Air Force, was based at Turnhouse. Equipped with Spitfires, it performed patrolling duties. In August, No. 603 Squadron shifted south to Hornchurch to join No. 11 Group, heavily engaged in the Battle of Britain. On 29 August, Stokoe damaged a Messerschmitt Bf 109 fighter over Manston. Two days later he destroyed one Bf 109, and probably destroyed a second, to the north of Southend. He shot down a Bf 109 over Canterbury on 1 September and the next day damaged a Messerschmitt Bf 110 heavy fighter to the north of Hawkinge. Stokoe was subsequently shot down, his Spitfire being set alight. He baled out of the aircraft but was seriously burnt on the face and hands. Initially reported as missing, after landing he was taken to hospital near Maidstone, where he spent six weeks.

By the time of Stokoe's return to No. 603 Squadron on 19 October, the Luftwaffe had eased its offensive against southeast England and the pace of operations slowed. Stokoe had an engine malfunction on his Spitfire while flying a sortie over the sea a week later. He had sufficient height to glide back over land, putting the aircraft down on a farmer's field. He shared in the destruction of a Bf 110 on 7 November and shot down a Bf 109 near Deal the next day. He also damaged a Bf 109. On 17 November he destroyed a Bf 109 to the east of Rochford.

=== Circus offensive ===
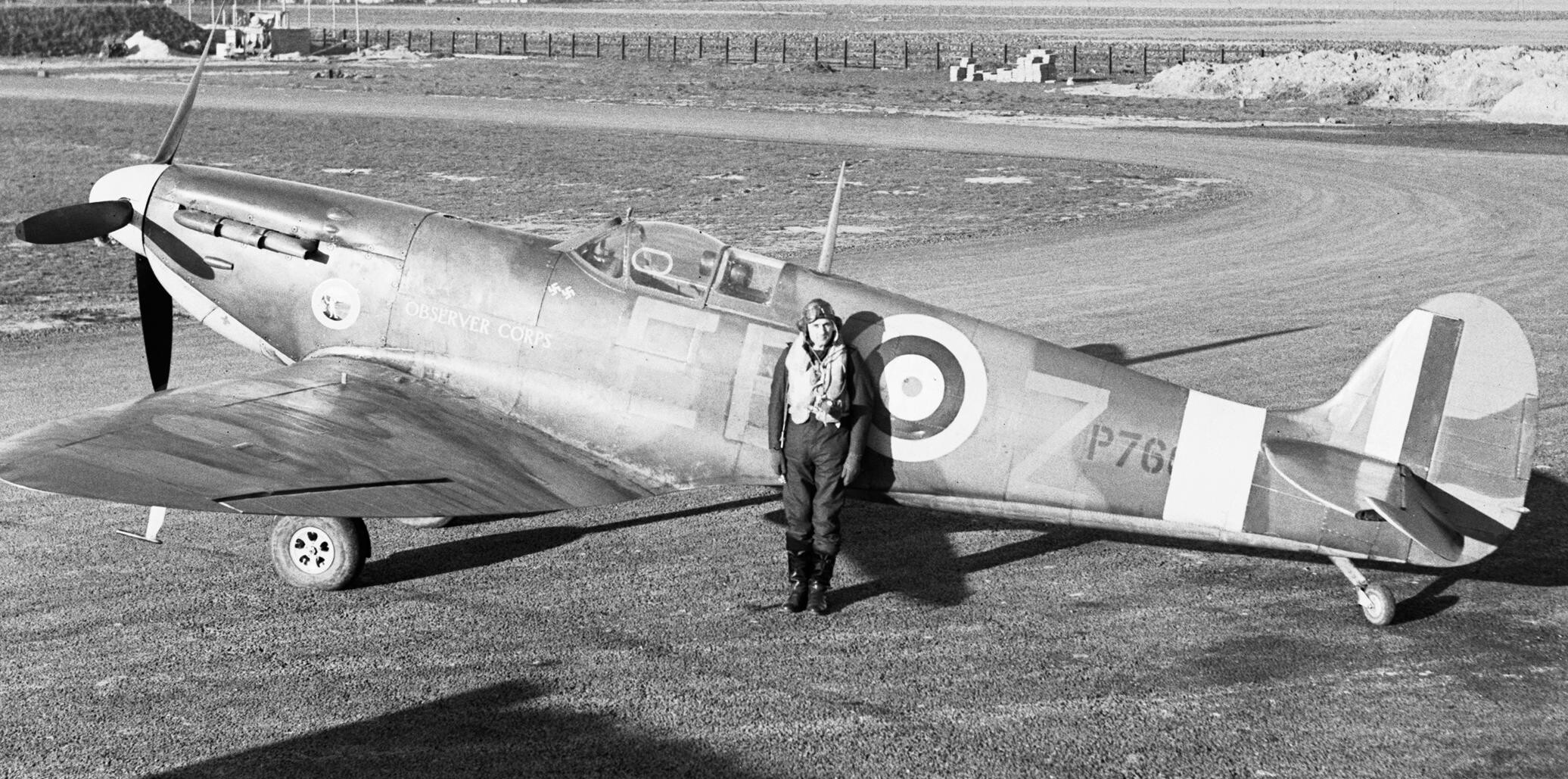
A Royal Observer Corps presentation Spitfire; Stokoe was flying an aircraft like this on 20 April 1941 when he was shot down

In late January 1941, Stokoe was commissioned as a pilot officer and early the following month he was posted to No. 54 Squadron. This was based at Hornchurch and had just taken on the Spitfires of No. 41 Squadron for use in the RAF's Circus offensive. On 5 March No. 54 Squadron flew a fighter sweep in support of Circus No. 7, a bombing raid on Boulogne harbour. During this sortie, Stokoe destroyed a Bf 109 to the southwest of Boulogne without firing at the aircraft. It had made a diving attack on his Spitfire, which Stokoe evaded. He then commenced a diving pursuit on the Bf 109 but it crashed into the sea before he could open fire. On another sortie, carried out on 20 April, Stokoe was flying a presentation Spitfire, named for the Royal Observer Corps, when he destroyed a Bf 110 to the south of Clacton. He was shot down himself, bailing out into the sea from which he was picked up by a rescue launch. He received hospital care for a week before returning to his squadron.

Stokoe damaged a Bf 109 near Dover on 6 May and claimed a share in the probable destruction of another Bf 109 south of Calais on 7 June. He probably destroyed a Bf 109 on 21 June near Gravelines. Three days later he shot down a Bf 109 off the Flanders coast.

=== Later war service ===
In late June Stokoe was posted to No. 74 Squadron, serving there only for a short period before being assigned to instructing duties, firstly at No. 59 OTU at Crosby-on-Eden and then No. 60 OTU at East Fortune. Stokoe was promoted to flying officer in January 1942. In October 1943, now in the rank of flight lieutenant, he went to Drem where he was an instructor on airborne radar equipment at No. 1692 (R/D) Flight. Awarded the Distinguished Flying Cross the following June, he was then promoted to squadron leader. After participating in a course at the Central Gunnery School, he commanded a gunnery section at No. 1692 (R/D) Flight.

Stokoe was appointed a senior administrative officer at the RAF Station at Great Massingham in June 1945. After two months he became the station's commander. At the end of the year, he was transferred to the headquarters of Transport Command. In early 1946 he went to Australia and served with No. 300 Group in Melbourne. He was repatriated to the United Kingdom in May–June 1946, and on the return voyage sailed as officer commanding of troops. He was discharged from the RAF in August.

== Later life ==
Returning to civilian life, Stokoe worked at the Kent County Council (KCC). In July 1947 he rejoined the RAFVR as a flying officer, based at No. 24 Reserve Flying School. He retired as a flight lieutenant after five years service. He eventually became the KCC's Chief Standards Trading Officer before his retirement in 1983. He suffered a fatal stroke on 2 October 1999.

Stokoe is credited with having destroyed eight aircraft, one of which were shared with other pilots. He is believed to have also probably destroyed three aircraft and damaged four others.
