= Croxdale railway station =

Disused railway station in Croxdale, County Durham

Croxdale
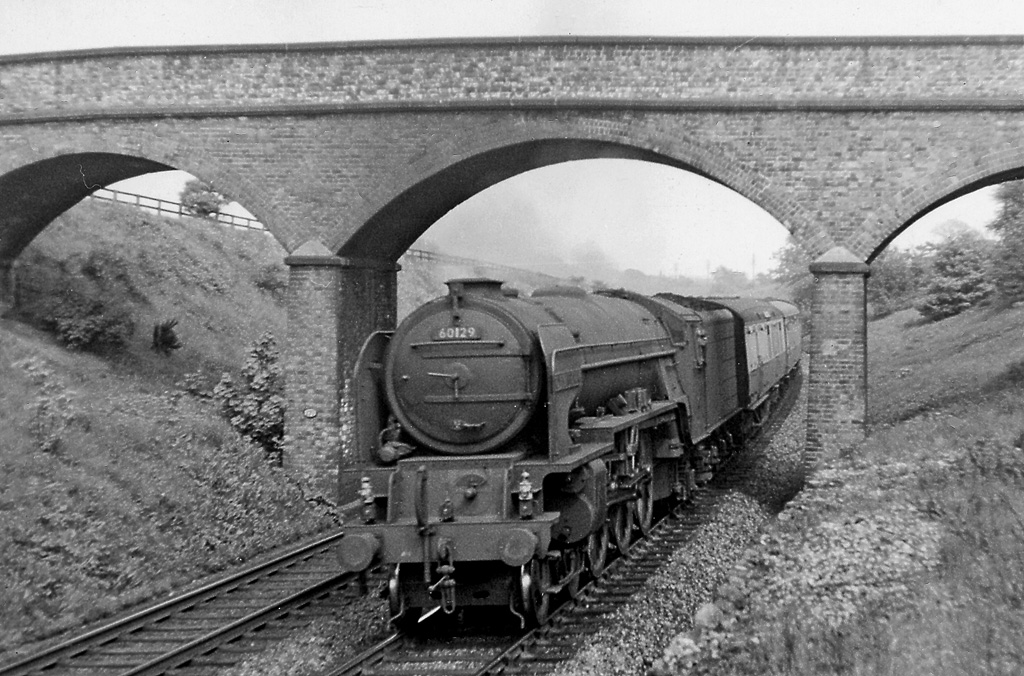
- An A1 Pacific steam train passing through the former site of the station in 1954

General information
- Location: Croxdale, County Durham; England
- Coordinates: 54.7318°N 1.5885°W
- Grid reference: NZ266375
- Platforms: 2

Other information
- Status: Disused

History
- Original company: North Eastern Railway
- Pre-grouping: North Eastern Railway
- Post-grouping: LNER

Key dates
- May 1872: Opened
- 26 September 1938: Closed
Location

Croxdale railway station served the village of Croxdale, County Durham, England from 1872 to 1938 on the East Coast Main Line.

== History ==
The station was opened in May 1872 by the North Eastern Railway. It closed on 26 September 1938 to both passengers and goods traffic.

Preceding station	Historical railways	Following station
Ferryhill; Line open, station closed	North Eastern Railway; East Coast Main Line	Durham; Line and station open
