= Sedgefield railway station =

Disused railway station in Sedgefield, County Durham

Sedgefield

General information
- Location: Sedgefield, County Durham; England
- Platforms: 2

Other information
- Status: Disused

History
- Original company: Clarence Railway
- Pre-grouping: North Eastern Railway
- Post-grouping: London and North Eastern Railway

Key dates
- 11 July 1835: Opened
- 31 March 1952: Closed for regular passenger trains
- 1960: closed completely
Location

Sedgefield railway station served the town of Sedgefield, County Durham, England, from 1835 to 1952 on the Clarence Railway.

== History ==
The station was opened on 11 July, 1835, by the Clarence Railway. It closed on 31 March, 1952, but continued to be used for race meetings until 1960.

Preceding station	Disused railways	Following station
Ferryhill; Line and station closed	Clarence Railway	Stillington; Line open, station closed
