= ROF Aycliffe =

English munitions factory from World War II

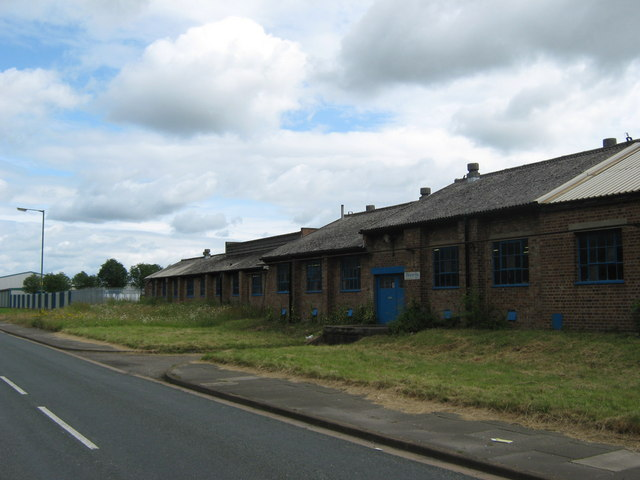
The former WW2 Royal Ordnance Factory building at Aycliffe

ROF Aycliffe, was a Royal Ordnance Factory built on an 867-acre (3.51 km^{2}) site off Heighington Lane, Aycliffe, County Durham, England during the early 1940s.

== "Aycliffe Angels" ==
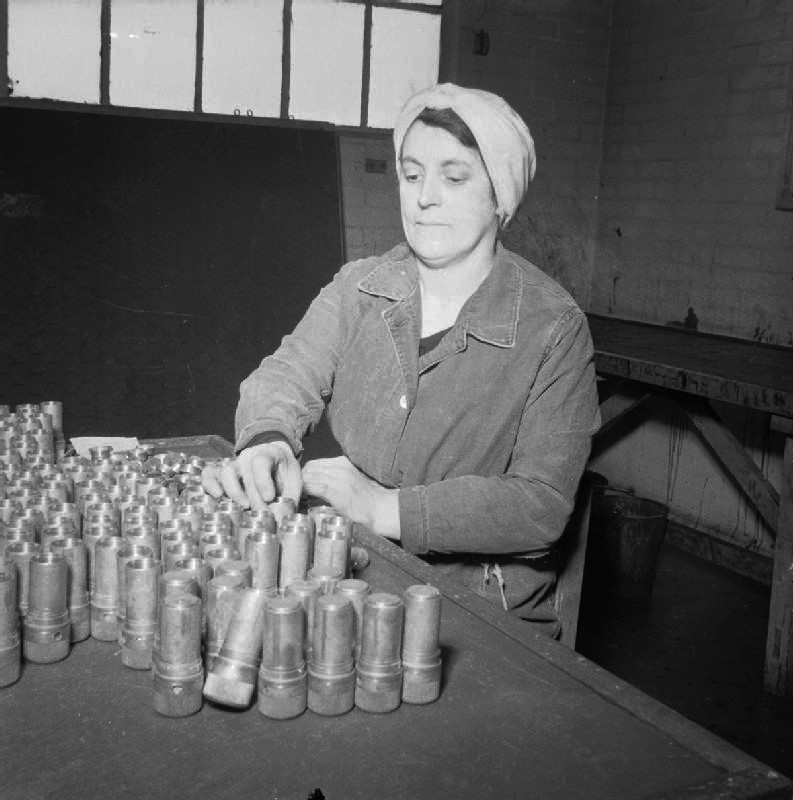
A munitions worker at a ROF Aycliffe, c1942

The factory's workers included around 17,000 women from the surrounding towns and villages, who worked filling shells and bullets and assembling detonators and fuzes for the war effort. They became known as the "Aycliffe Angels" after a Nazi propaganda broadcast from Lord Haw-Haw threatened that "The little angels of Aycliffe won't get away with it" and promised that the Luftwaffe would bomb them into submission.

By its nature the work was very dangerous and many workers were killed and injured during the manufacturing process; however due to the secrecy surrounding the factory and its workers, many incidents went unrecorded and unreported in the news and their efforts went unrecognised.

In 2000 local newspaper The Northern Echo launched a campaign to have their work officially recognised, and this led to a memorial service which was attended by Prime Minister and local MP Tony Blair and the Queen. A permanent memorial was also placed in Newton Aycliffe town centre commemorating their efforts.

A blue plaque commemorating the women who worked there was unveiled in October 2021 by Durham County Council after a nomination by the Durham Women's Banner Group.

== Railway stations ==
=== Demons Bridge ===
Demons Bridge

General information
- Location: Newton Aycliffe, County Durham; England
- Coordinates: 54°36′30″N 1°33′42″W
- Platforms: ?

Other information
- Status: Disused

History
- Original company: Clarence Railway
- Pre-grouping: Clarence Railway

Key dates
- 1941: Station Opened
- 1954: Station Closed
- 1963: Line Closed
Location
- Location within County Durham

Demons Bridge railway station served the former ROF Aycliffe in County Durham, England from 1941 to 1953. It was used for workers going to and from the factory as well as for freight traffic. The line closed in 1963 and the site is now partly occupied by an industrial estate.

Preceding station	Historical railways	Following station
Stillington; Line closed, station open	North Eastern Railway; Clarence Railway (Demon's Bridge Branch)	Terminus

=== Simpasture ===
Simpasture

General information
- Location: Newton Aycliffe, County Durham; England
- Coordinates: 54.61202°N 1.57786°W
- Platforms: ?

Other information
- Status: Disused

History
- Original company: Clarence Railway
- Pre-grouping: Clarence Railway

Key dates
- 1941: Station Opened
- 1954: Station Closed
- 1963: Line Closed
Location
- Location within County Durham

Simpasture railway station served ROF Aycliffe in County Durham, England from 1941 to 1953. It was used for workers going to and from the factory as well as for freight traffic. The line closed in 1963 and the site is now occupied by Northfield Way Industrial Estate.

The station was opened in 1941 along with nearby Demons Bridge on the Clarence Railway although the station was on the Shildon branch. The station was closed sometime in the 1950s and the line in the early 1960s.

Preceding station	Historical railways	Following station
Shildon; Line closed, station open	North Eastern Railway; Clarence Railway (Simpasture Branch)	Terminus

== Operations ==
The marshy location was chosen as it was an ideal site, shrouded in fog and mist for much of the year, which provided cover against bombing by the Luftwaffe. It opened as ROF 59 (Filling factory early in 1941, resulting in the construction and opening of two new stations on the former Clarence Railway at Simpasture and Demons Bridge.

As a munitions factory, ROF Aycliffe operated 24 hours a day, employing over 17,000 workers in three shift groups. Most of the workers were women. They were transported from surrounding areas onto the site by bus and train, with the most local workers arriving on foot or by bicycle.

During its existence, the factory produced finished munitions including bullets, shells and mines. Operational for just over four years until the end of World War II in 1945, by which point it had produced some 700 million bullets and countless other munitions. The factory was designated as a 'Top Secret' installation and surrounded by high fences with barbed wire. The factory was visited during the war years by Winston Churchill and members of the British royal family. Many well-known entertainers of the day also performed at the factory for the workers.

== Post-war ==
After the war, the factory closed and the site was turned into the Newton Aycliffe Industrial Estate in the late 1940s. Many of the original buildings are still standing today.
