= Ferryhill railway station =

Former railway station in England

Coordinates: 54°40′51.65″N 1°31′51″W

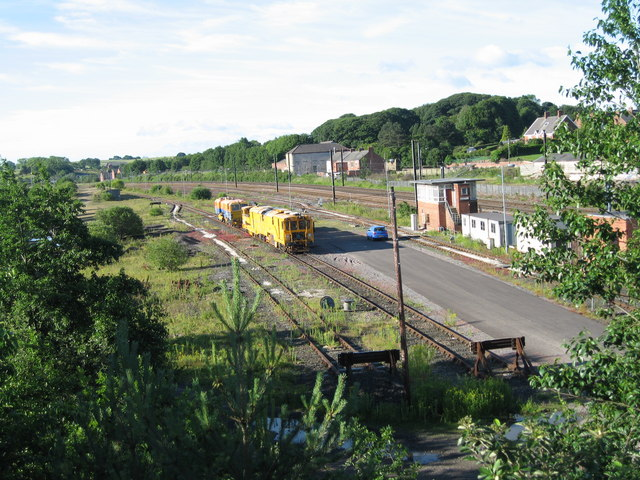
- Former site of Ferryhill station and goods yard, July 2007

General information
- Location: Ferryhill, County Durham; England
- Grid reference: NZ304319
- Platforms: 6

Other information
- Status: Disused

History
- Original company: Clarence Railway
- Pre-grouping: North Eastern Railway
- Post-grouping: London and North Eastern Railway

Key dates
- 16 January 1834: Opened to freight
- 19 June 1844: Opened to passengers
- October 1846: Services start to Hartlepool
- June 1887: Rebuilt by NER as island platform
- 6 March 1967: Closes to passengers
- 1967: Closes to freight
- 1969: Burnt down, subsequently demolished
Location

Ferryhill railway station was located in Ferryhill, County Durham, Northeast England. It was located on what became the East Coast Main Line between Darlington and Durham, close to the junctions with several former branches, including the extant freight-only Stillington Line to Norton-on-Tees and Stockton.

== History ==
The Clarence Railway reached the town of Ferryhill when its main line from Stockton and Port Clarence opened to mineral traffic on 16 January 1834, and was first served by passenger trains on 11 July 1835. The first station was developed by the Clarence on the current site in 1840, serving a town population of 850. The position was chosen as it lay close to both natural deposits of coal and limestone. The Clarence Railway Act 1829 (10 Geo. 4. c. cvi) gave the Clarence powers to construct branches to Wingate for the City of Durham, Sherburn and Byers Green although only the latter of these ever reached its intended destinations. The Sherburn Branch was only opened as far as Coxhoe whilst the City of Durham Branch made it no further than Thrislington.

The Clarence Railway Byers Green Branch was opened to mineral traffic on 31 March 1837, despite construction not being officially completed for a further 4 years, due to a clause in the railway's Act requiring the line to be opened no later than 1837. This line saw an intermittent passenger service until it was extended to Bishop Auckland by the North Eastern Railway (NER) in 1885.

The Clarence also developed a goods yard on the site, which would later become one of the busiest in Europe between the 1920s and the 1950s. During World War II, the goods yard became the main alternative for all freight to York, mainly due to volume of traffic but also occasional Nazi Luftwaffe bombing.

On 11 July 1839 the Great North of England, Clarence and Hartlepool Junction Railway (GNEC&HJR) reached Thrislington, having constructed its line from the Hartlepool Dock and Railway (HD&R) at Wingate and attempted to complete its link to the Clarence and the proposed Great North of England Railway (GNER) trunk line. Whilst the railway had obtained powers to cross and join the GNER, it had failed to do the same for its crossing and joining of the Clarence. The completion of the GNEC&HJR would have provided a shorter route to the coast than the Clarence and thus have a serious impact on its profitability. Because of this oversight by the GNEC&HJR, the Clarence was able to delay the line's completion by 7 years by which point the GNEC&HJR had been leased by the HD&R before both companies were leased by the York and Newcastle Railway. A passenger service over the GNEC&HJR was finally introduced on 13 October 1846 though this required a reversal at Thinford Junction until the NER opened a south to west curve in 1873.

In 1844, the Newcastle and Darlington Junction Railway completed their line from Darlington to Gateshead which ran parallel to the Clarence through Ferryhill whilst the Clarence was taken over by the West Hartlepool Harbour & Railway Company.

After the two competing lines were amalgamated within the North Eastern Railway, the final additions to the network around Ferryhill were completed with the opening of a link to the Team Valley line at Durham to goods traffic in September 1872 and express and stopping passenger traffic on 15 January 1872 and 1 March 1872 respectively. To allow the NER to make the station a stop for trains to and from Edinburgh to London King's Cross that company rebuilt the station as an island platform at a cost of £13,612 in June 1887. These services were continued when the station became part of the London and North Eastern Railway in 1923.

To allow for better servicing of locomotives in the area, the NER built an adjacent engine shed in 1871, which as the coal mines in the area declined was closed from 1938.

In 1902 Bolckow Vaughan sank the Dean and Chapter Colliery just south of the station, which until its closure in 1969 provided much of the station's traffic. The development included a coking coal works, which closed in 1930. In 1946 both Dean and Chapter and the local Mainsforth Colliery were nationalised and taken over by the National Coal Board.

Ferryhill railway station was once one of the busiest goods yards in Europe.

=== Closure ===
The service to Coxhoe along the truncated Sherburn branch was withdrawn by the NER as early as 1902 though the line remained open to goods traffic until 1966. Passenger services on the Byers Green branch were withdrawn beyond Spennymoor on 4 December 1939 and ended completely on 31 March 1952. The other branch lines radiating from Ferryhill were progressively closed between the 1940s and 1950s with the Leamside Line closing to local traffic on 28 July 1941, the former Clarence Railway main line to Stockton losing passenger services on 31 March 1952 and passenger services on the former GNEC&HJR route to Hartlepool being withdrawn on 9 June of the same year.

In 1963 as part of the Beeching Axe, it was recommended that the station close. However, strong local opposition resulted in the station remaining open for passengers until 6 March 1967. It remained open as a goods-only station, but after the closure of Dean and Chapter in 1969, the station burnt down. The demolition contractors for the colliery in the 1970s also demolished the residual station building structures.

== Present and Future ==
Nothing remains of the former station, although freight trains still service the Lafarge cement works at Thrislington Quarry to the north, which is scheduled to be redeveloped as a landfill site. The junction between the ECML and line to Stockton & Middlesbrough remains in use, though the latter route is only open for freight traffic and occasional diversions.

After the MP for Sedgefield, Paul Howell, raised the issue in the House of Commons in June 2020, a petition was launched to request the reopening of the station in August of that year and, in the November, the Department for Transport awarded up to £50,000 from the Restoring Your Railway Fund for an initial study to investigate the feasibility of the proposal.

Preceding station	Historical railways	Following station
Bradbury; Line open, station closed	London and North Eastern Railway; East Coast Main Line	Croxdale; Line open, station closed
Terminus	London and North Eastern Railway; Leamside Line	Shincliffe; Line and station closed
Terminus	London and North Eastern Railway; Great North of England, Clarence and Hartlepool Junction Railway	West Cornforth; Line and station closed
Sedgefield; Line and station closed	London and North Eastern Railway; Clarence Railway	Terminus
Terminus	London and North Eastern Railway; Clarence Railway (Byers Green Branch)	Spennymoor; Line and station closed
Terminus	North Eastern Railway; Clarence Railway (Coxhoe Branch)	Coxhoe; Line and station closed
