= Trimdon railway station =

Disused railway station in Trimdon, County Durham

Trimdon

General information
- Location: Trimdon, County Durham; England
- Coordinates: 54.7194°N 1.4125°W
- Grid reference: NZ379362

Other information
- Status: Disused

History
- Original company: North Eastern Railway
- Pre-grouping: North Eastern Railway
- Post-grouping: London and North Eastern Railway

Key dates
- August 1871: Opened
- 9 June 1952: Closed
Location

Trimdon railway station served the village of Trimdon, County Durham, England, from 1871 to 1952 on the Great North of England, Clarence and Hartlepool Junction Railway.

== History ==
The station was opened in August 1871 by the North Eastern Railway. Upon its opening the first Trimdon station was renamed Trimdon Foundry but subsequently closed two years later. To the north was the signal box and on the platform was the station building. It closed on 9 June 1952.

Preceding station	Disused railways	Following station
Coxhoe Bridge; Line and station closed	North Eastern Railway; Great North of England, Clarence and Hartlepool Junction Railway	Wingate; Line and station closed
