= West Cornforth =

Village in County Durham, United Kingdom

Coordinates: 54°42′N 1°31′W

West Cornforth is a village in County Durham, in England. It is situated to the south of Cornforth, near the A1(M) motorway, Coxhoe, Ferryhill and Spennymoor. It is known locally as “Doggie”, but the etymology of this name is uncertain. It may relate to the former production of dog irons. In 2008, the village was awarded the 'Calor Village of the Year' in the young people's Northern category. In 2011, the village had a population of 2,501.

The village dates back to 1857 and grew in size in conjunction with the local coal mine, Thrislington Colliery (now Thrislington Quarry), until its closure in 1967. It was served by the West Cornforth railway station up to 1952.

== Notable people ==
- Jack Stokoe (1920–1999), flying ace with the Royal Air Force during the Second World War
- Sir Moir Lockhead OBE, DHC (born 1945), businessman, was educated in West Cornforth School.
- Gordon Cowans (born 1958), footballer, most famous for his career at Aston Villa F.C.
