= Hartlepools Steam Tramways Company =

Tramway operator in England

Hartlepools Steam Tramways

Operation
- Locale: Hartlepool
- Open: 2 August 1884
- Close: 21 February 1891
- Status: Closed

Infrastructure
- Track gauge: 3 ft 6 in (1,067 mm)
- Propulsion system: Steam

The Hartlepools Steam Tramways operated a tramway service in Hartlepool between 1884 and 1891.

== History ==
The Hartlepool Tramways Order 1883 authorised the Hartlepools Steam Tramways Company Ltd to construct the tramway which was built to a gauge of 3 ft 6 in (1,067 mm).

Construction work started on 22 November 1883 with a ceremony at Church Street, West Hartlepool. The company purchased rail from Phoenix of Germany, with a weight of 65 lbs per yard, and 75 lbs per yard for passing loops. The rails were set on a bed of concrete and finished with granite sets paving. The contractor, Wilkes and Co of London complete construction work between Hartlepool and Church Street by July 1884. The Stockton Street line was also finished, but never used.

The line was inspected by Major-General Charles Scrope Hutchinson of the Board of Trade on 1 August 1884. Services started on 2 August 1884 from Northgate, Hartlepool, via Millbank Crescent, Cleveland Road and Clarence Road, terminating in Church Street, West Hartlepool. The opening day was marred slightly when rounding the curve in front of the police station, the engine left the rails, causing the car to oscillate which alarmed the passengers. Fortunately the couplings snapped and the car remained upright.

Initially there was only one tram engine, which allowed for an hourly service, but within a few days a second engine arrived. By October there were four engines and four cars. The service operated every 20 minutes from 8.00am to 11.00pm on weekdays and from midday to 10.00pm on Sundays. A fifth car arrived in May 1885. The rolling stock was provided by the Falcon Works, with a total fleet of 6 locomotives.

The tramwaymen went on strike on 22 September 1888 due to the company’s refusal to grant pay and a quarter for work on a Sunday. They were replaced by new workers. However, this was shortlived, as after a series of accidents and irregular running, the original men were taken back on by the company.

== Closure ==
By 1888 the financial position of the tramway was poor. There was only £2,000 of income, most of which was spent on operating costs. Services ran for the last time on 21 February 1891.

It was resurrected as Hartlepool Electric Tramways in 1896.

== Notable people ==
=== General Managers ===
- John Jacobs 1884
- John Robert Nixon 1884 - 1888
- Thomas Tweddell 1888 - 1891

== Sources ==
Works cited

- Watson, J.D. (1990). "The Tramways of Hartlepool". The Tramway Review. 144.
