= Coxhoe Bridge railway station =

Disused railway station in Coxhoe, County Durham

Coxhoe Bridge
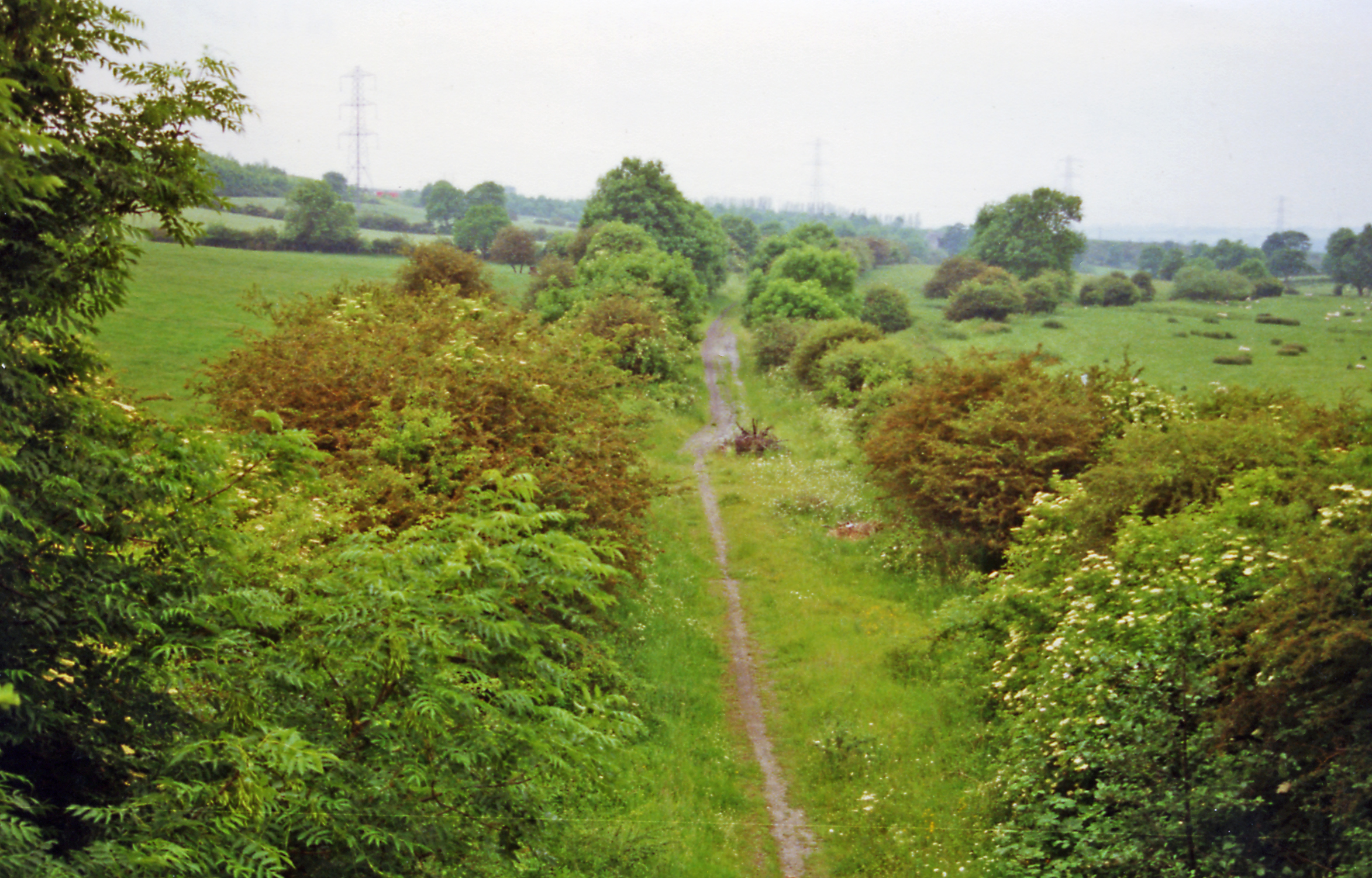
- The site of the station in 2000

General information
- Location: Coxhoe, County Durham; England
- Coordinates: 54.7072°N 1.4956°W
- Grid reference: NZ326348
- Platforms: 2

Other information
- Status: Disused

History
- Original company: York and Newcastle Railway
- Pre-grouping: York, Newcastle and Berwick Railway; North Eastern Railway
- Post-grouping: London & North Eastern Railway; British Railways (North Eastern)

Key dates
- 12 August 1846: Opened
- 9 June 1952: Closed to passengers
- 9 June 1984: Closed to freight
Location

Coxhoe Bridge railway station served the village of Coxhoe, County Durham, England, from 1846 to 1984 on the Hartlepool–Ferryhill Line.

== History ==
The station opened on 12 August 1846 by the York and Newcastle Railway. In Bradshaw it was known as Coxhoe but Bridge was added in 1860. It closed to passengers on 9 June 1952 but goods continued to serve Coxhoe Quarry until 9 June 1984.

Preceding station	Disused railways	Following station
West Cornforth; Line and station closed	London and North Eastern Railway; Hartlepool–Ferryhill Line	Trimdon; Line and station closed
