= New Coundon =

Village in County Durham, England

Coordinates: 54°39′58″N 1°38′51″W

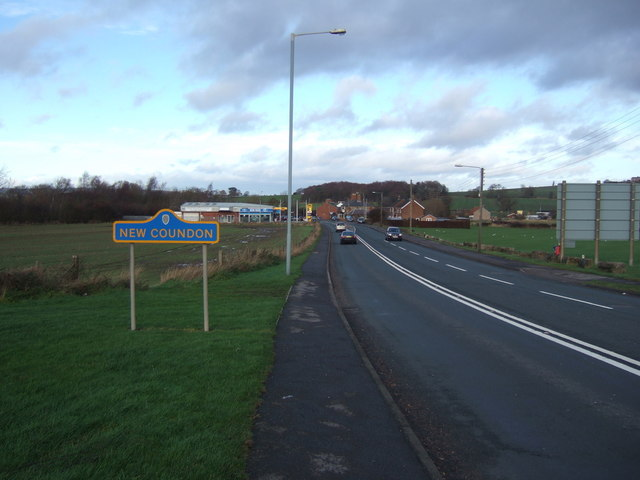
- Entering New Coundon

- Location within County Durham
- Population: 41 (2021 census)
- Unitary authority: County Durham
- Ceremonial county: Durham
- Region: North East
- Country: England
- Sovereign state: United Kingdom
- Police: Durham
- Fire: County Durham and Darlington
- Ambulance: North East

New Coundon is a small village in County Durham, England. It is situated to the west of Coundon, near Bishop Auckland. In the 2001 census New Coundon had a population of 41.
