= West Cornforth railway station =

Disused railway station in West Cornforth, County Durham

West Cornforth
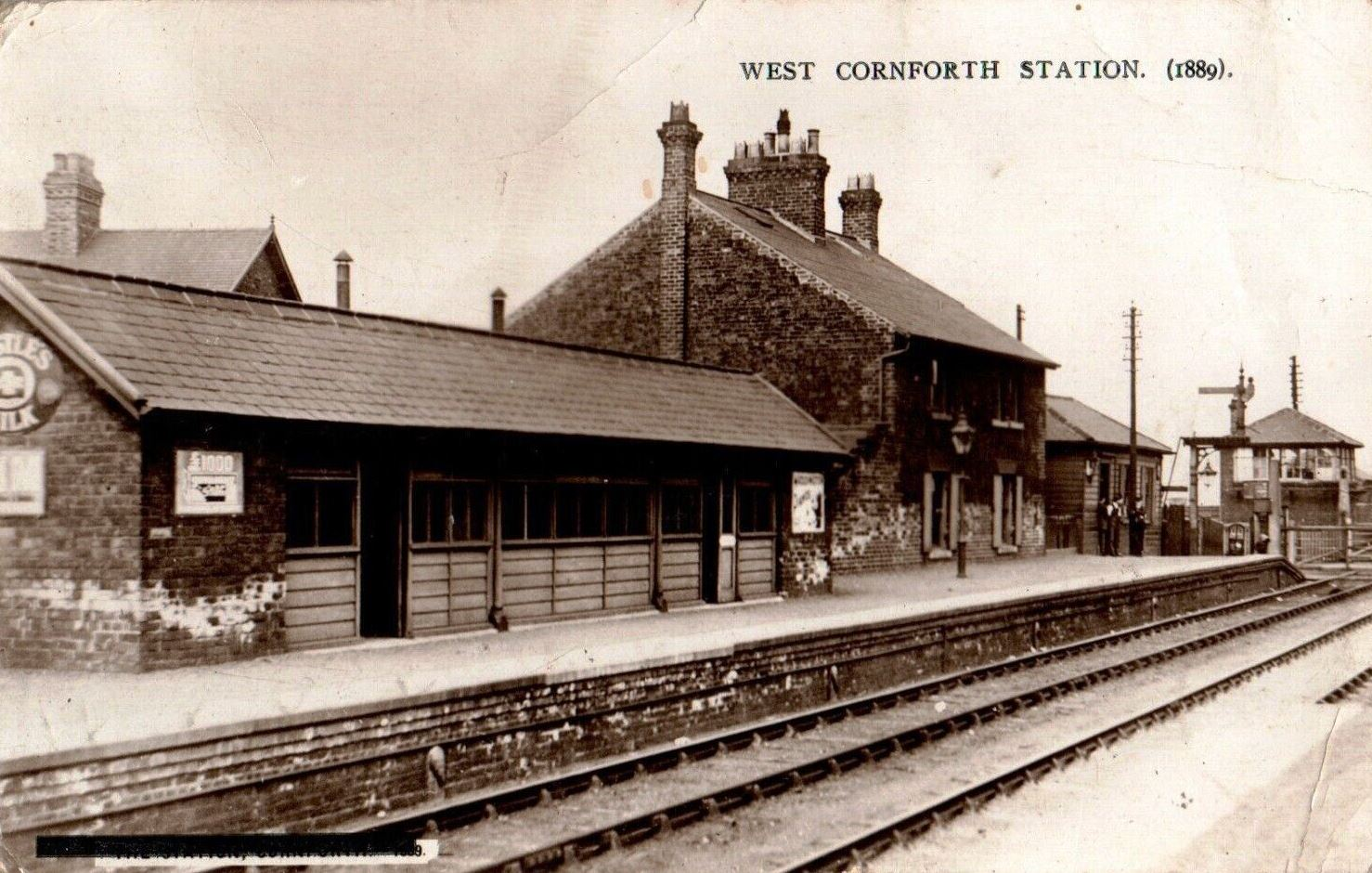

General information
- Location: West Cornforth, County Durham; England
- Coordinates: 54.7033°N 1.5273°W
- Grid reference: NZ305343
- Platforms: 2

Other information
- Status: Disused

History
- Original company: York, Newcastle and Berwick Railway
- Pre-grouping: North Eastern Railway
- Post-grouping: London and North Eastern Railway

Key dates
- August 1866: Opened as Thrislington
- 1 July 1891: Name changed to West Cornforth
- 9 June 1952: Closed
Location

West Cornforth railway station served the village of West Cornforth, County Durham, England, from 1866 to 1952 on the Great North of England, Clarence and Hartlepool Junction Railway.

== History ==
The station was opened as Thrislington in August 1866 by the York, Newcastle and Berwick Railway. Its name was changed to West Cornforth on 1 July 1891. It closed on 9 June 1952.

Preceding station	Disused railways	Following station
Terminus	York, Newcastle and Berwick Railway; Great North of England, Clarence and Hartlepool Junction Railway	Coxhoe Bridge; Line and station closed
