= George Leather =

England international rugby union player

- Born: 22 February 1881 Leigh, Lancashire, England
- Died: 2 January 1957 (aged 75) Liverpool, Lancashire, England
- Occupation: Accountant

Rugby union career
- Position: Forward
International career
Years	Team	Apps	(Points)
1907	England	1	(0)

George Leather (22 February 1881 – 2 January 1957) was an English international rugby union player.

A Leigh-born forward, Leather played his rugby with the Liverpool club and was a regular Lancashire representative, while also earning a solitary England cap against Ireland at Lansdowne Road in 1907.

Leather, an accountant, served as treasurer of the Liverpool Cricket Club and was a long-serving secretary of the Liverpool Playhouse theatre. He was also an executive on the Merseyside Hospitals Council and a Liverpool city magistrate.

== See also ==
- List of England national rugby union players
