= Spennymoor railway station =

Disused railway station in Spennymoor, County Durham

Spennymoor

General information
- Location: Spennymoor, County Durham; England
- Coordinates: 54.6977°N 1.6032°W
- Grid reference: NZ257337
- Platforms: 1

Other information
- Status: Disused

History
- Original company: Clarence Railway
- Pre-grouping: North Eastern Railway
- Post-grouping: LNER; British Rail (North Eastern)

Key dates
- November 1845: Opened
- 13 March 1952: Closed to passengers
- 2 May 1966: Closed completely
Location

Spennymoor railway station served the town of Spennymoor, County Durham, England from 1845 to 1952 on the Byers Green Branch of the Clarence Railway.

== History ==
The station opened in November 1845 by the Clarence Railway. It was situated on the east side of Carr Street, formerly on the A6074. The station was initially served by market day passenger services from Tod Hills (or Todhills) to the west, but services were cut back to Byers Green from 1848. The service was again extended to Tod Hills in 1865, before the passenger service on the branch was withdrawn in 1867.

The service was restored in 1878, when a new Byers Green station opened at the site of the original Tod Hills station. In 1885 the North Eastern Railway opened a new line from Burnhouse Junction, to the east of Byers Green station, to Bishop Auckland. However, due to the rural nature of the line's western section, traffic between Spennymoor and Bishop Auckland was fairly light and as a consequence passenger services on this section were withdrawn on 4 December 1939. The station continued to be served by shuttle services from Ferryhill as well as football special trains until the line was closed to passenger traffic on 31 March 1952. The station closed completely on 2 May 1966.

Preceding station	Disused railways	Following station
Ferryhill; Line and station closed	Clarence Railway; Byers Green Branch	Byers Green; Line and station closed
