= Hartlepool Electric Tramways =

Historical British Tram line

Operation
- Locale: Hartlepool
- Open: January 1899
- Close: 25 March 1927
- Status: Closed

Infrastructure
- Track gauge: 3 ft 6 in (1,067 mm)
- Propulsion system: Electric

Statistics
- Route length: 6.98 miles (11.23 km)

The Hartlepool Electric Tramways operated a tramway service in Hartlepool, County Durham, England, between 1899 and 1927.

== History ==
The Hartlepool Electric Tramways Company was a subsidiary of British Electric Traction. In January 1899 it purchased the assets of the Hartlepools Steam Tramways Company, which had been owned by the General Electric Tramways Company since 1895.

The Hartlepool Electric Tramways Order 1895 gave the General Electric Tramways Company power to acquire the assets of the Hartlepools Steam Tramways Company and modernise and electrify the system. Electric services began on 19 May 1896. Five electric tramcars were obtained from G. F. Milnes & Co. based in a new depot on Cleveland Road at Greenland.

Meanwhile, the Hartlepool Electric Tramways Company, a subsidiary of British Electric Traction, constructed the remaining sections. In January 1899 it gained control of the whole system and on 10 March 1899, Clarence Road to Foggy Furze, and a branch from Stockton Street to Ward Jackson Park opened with five tramcars from Brush Electrical Engineering Company. An extension from Church Street to Seaton Carew, via Seaton Road, opened on 28 March 1902.

On 31 August 1912, West Hartlepool Corporation purchased the tramway within its boundaries. In 1925 the section within Hartlepool was bought by Hartlepool Corporation and leased back to the company.

== Closure ==
The system was closed on 25 March 1927.
