= Todhills, County Durham =

Village in County Durham, England

Coordinates: 54.699°N 1.670°W

Todhills
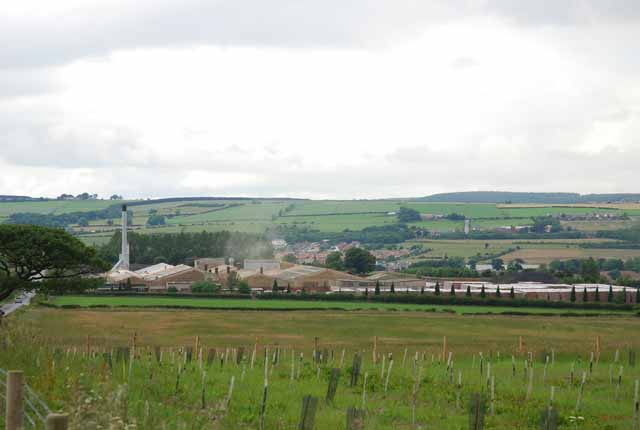

- Location within County Durham
- OS grid reference: NZ213338
- Civil parish: Spennymoor
- Unitary authority: County Durham
- Ceremonial county: Durham
- Region: North East
- Country: England
- Sovereign state: United Kingdom
- Post town: DARLINGTON
- Postcode district: DL14
- Police: Durham
- Fire: County Durham and Darlington
- Ambulance: North East

Todhills is a hamlet in the civil parish of Spennymoor, in County Durham, England. It is situated a few miles to the north of Bishop Auckland, between Newfield and Byers Green.
