= Stockton and Darlington Railway =

English railway company, 1825 to 1863

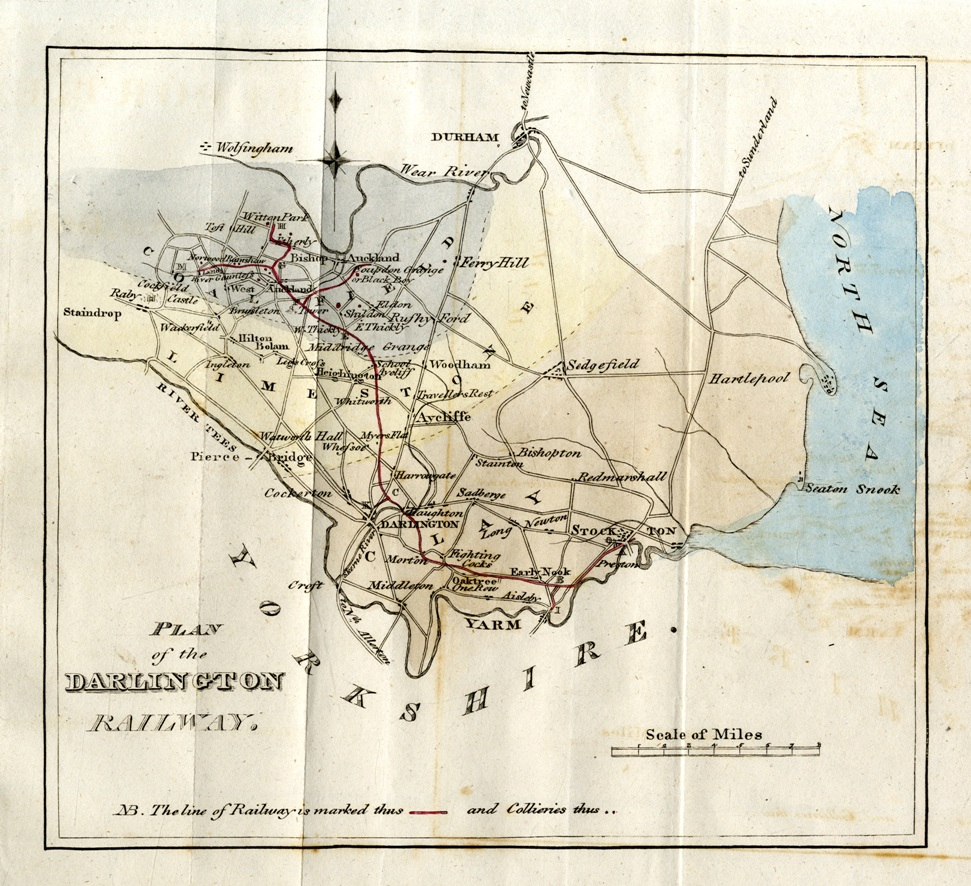
- Map of the original planned route of the railway, taken from the prospectus of 1821

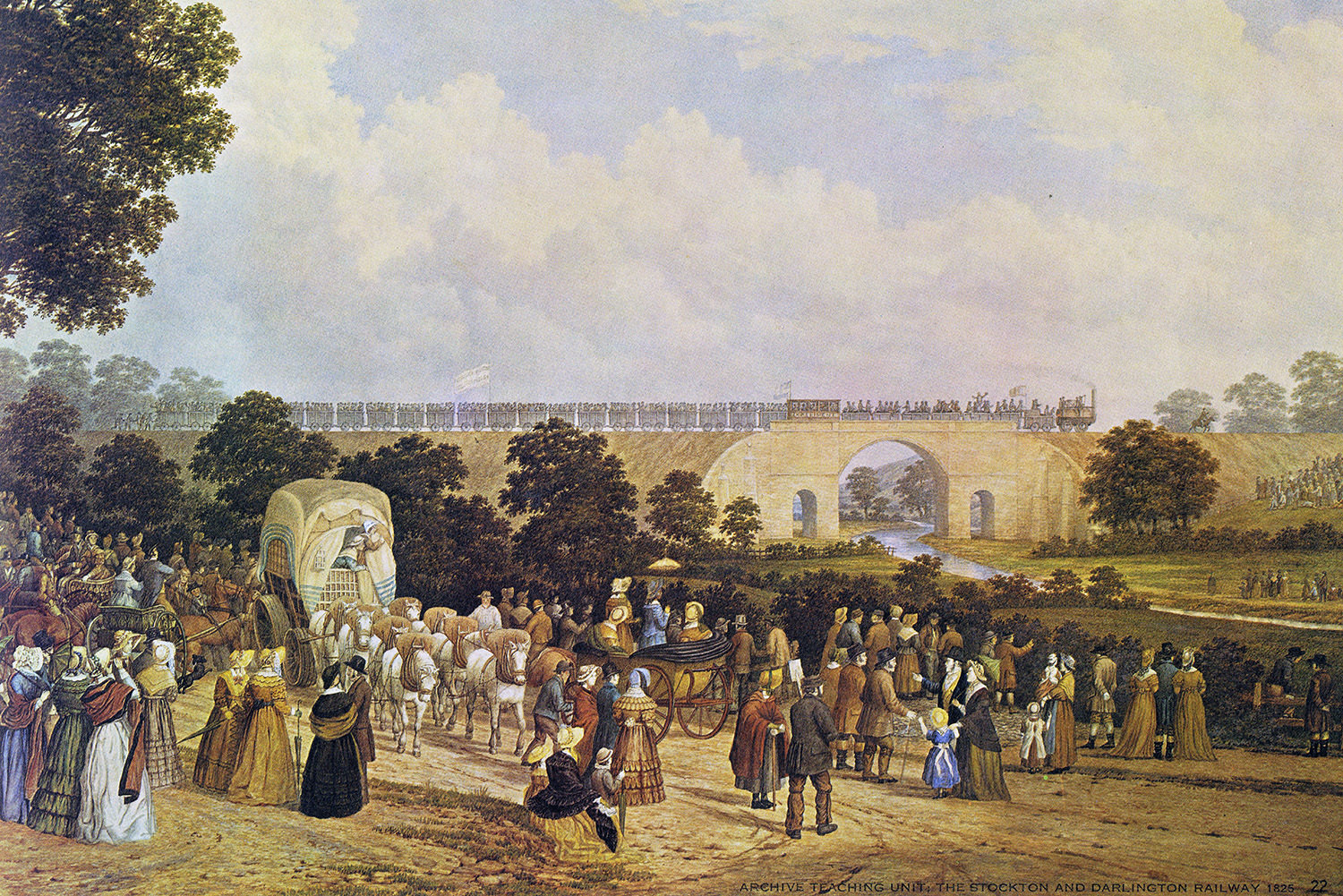
- In the Opening of the Stockton and Darlington Railway, a watercolour painted in the 1880s by John Dobbin, crowds watch the inaugural train cross the Skerne Bridge in Darlington.

Overview
- Locale: County Durham
- Dates of operation: 1825–1863
- Successor: North Eastern Railway

The Stockton and Darlington Railway (S&DR) was a railway company that operated in north-east England from 1825 to 1863. The world's first public railway to use steam locomotives, its first line connected collieries near Shildon with Darlington and Stockton in County Durham, and was officially opened on 27 September 1825. The movement of coal to ships rapidly became a lucrative business, and the line was soon extended to a new port at Middlesbrough. While coal waggons were hauled by steam locomotives from the start, passengers were carried in coaches drawn by horses until carriages hauled by steam locomotives were introduced in 1833.

The S&DR was involved in building the East Coast Main Line between York and Darlington, but its main expansion was at Middlesbrough Docks and west into Weardale and east to Redcar. It suffered severe financial difficulties at the end of the 1840s and was nearly taken over by the York, Newcastle and Berwick Railway, before the discovery of iron ore in Cleveland and the subsequent increase in revenue meant it could pay its debts. At the beginning of the 1860s it took over railways that had crossed the Pennines to join the West Coast Main Line at Tebay and Clifton, near Penrith.

The company was taken over by the North Eastern Railway in 1863, transferring 200 route miles (320 route kilometres) of line and about 160 locomotives, but continued to operate independently as the Darlington Section until 1876. The opening of the S&DR was seen as proof of steam railway effectiveness and its anniversary was celebrated in 1875, 1925, 1975 and 2025. Much of the original route is now served by the Tees Valley Line, operated by Northern.

== Genesis ==
=== Origins ===
The seal of the Stockton and Darlington Railway

Coal from the inland mines in southern County Durham used to be taken away on packhorses and later on horse-drawn carts as the roads were improved. A canal was proposed by George Dixon in 1767 and again by John Rennie in 1815, but both schemes failed. The harbour of Stockton-on-Tees invested considerably during the early 19th century in straightening the Tees in order to improve navigation on the river downstream of the town and was subsequently looking for ways to increase trade to recoup those costs.

A few years later, a canal was proposed on a route that bypassed Darlington and Yarm, and a meeting was held in Yarm to oppose the route. The Welsh engineer George Overton was consulted, and he advised building a tramroad. Overton carried out a survey and planned a route from the Etherley and Witton Collieries to Shildon, and then passing to the north of Darlington to reach Stockton. The Scottish engineer Robert Stevenson was said to favour the railway, and the Quaker Edward Pease supported it at a public meeting in Darlington on 13 November 1818, promising a five per cent return on investment. Approximately two-thirds of the shares were sold locally, and the rest were bought by Quakers nationally. (Note: In the 19th century members of the Society of Friends travelled to attend regular meetings and came to know Quakers elsewhere, this leading to marriages and business partnerships. The Society of Friends published guidance on conduct that included honesty in business matters, and this gave Quakers the confidence to invest in the dealings of a devout member.) (Note: "In the mean time, a bill is to be brought into Parliament to carry a rail-way from Bishop Auckland to Darlington and Stockton. Mr. Stevenson ... has been called ... to give an opinion as to the best line. The work is estimated at 120,000l., a great part of which is already subscribed.") A private bill was presented to Parliament in March 1819, but as the route passed through Earl of Eldon's estate and one of the Earl of Darlington's fox coverts, it was opposed and defeated by 13 votes.

Stockton and Darlington Railway Act 1821
- Act of Parliament
- Parliament of the United Kingdom
- Long title: An Act for making and maintaining a Railway or Tramroad from the River Tees at Stockton, to Witton Park Colliery, with several Branches therefrom, all in the County of Durham.
- Citation: 1 & 2 Geo. 4. c. xliv

Dates
- Royal assent: 19 April 1821

Other legislation
- Repealed by: Stockton and Darlington Railway (Consolidation of Acts, Increase of Capital and Purchase of Middlesbrough Dock) Act 1849

Status: Repealed

Overton surveyed a new line that avoided Darlington's estate and agreement was reached with Eldon, but another application was deferred early in 1820, as the death of King George III had made it unlikely a bill would pass that parliamentary year. The promoters lodged a bill on 30 September 1820, the route having changed again as agreement had not been reached with Viscount Barrington about the line passing over his land. The railway was unopposed this time, but the bill nearly failed to enter the committee stage as the required four-fifths of shares had not been sold. Pease subscribed £7,000; from that time he had considerable influence over the railway and it became known as "the Quaker line". The Stockton and Darlington Railway Act 1821 (1 & 2 Geo. 4. c. xliv), which received royal assent on 19 April 1821, allowed for a railway that could be used by anyone with suitably built vehicles on payment of a toll, that was closed at night, and with which land owners within 5 miles (8 km) could build branches and make junctions; no mention was made of steam locomotives. This new railway spurred the construction of more railway lines, causing significant developments in railway mapping and cartography, iron and steel manufacturing, as well as in any industries requiring more efficient transportation.

=== George Stephenson ===
Stephenson's iron bridge across the Gaunless

Concerned about Overton's competence, Pease asked George Stephenson, an experienced enginewright of the collieries of Killingworth, to meet him in Darlington. (Note: Smiles (1904, p. 150) indicates that Stephenson visited Pease uninvited, but Nicholas Wood, who had accompanied Stephenson, stated shortly after Stephenson's death that the meeting was by appointment.) On 12 May 1821 the shareholders appointed Thomas Meynell as chairman and Jonathan Backhouse as treasurer; a majority of the managing committee, which included Thomas Richardson, Edward Pease and his son Joseph Pease, were Quakers. The committee designed a seal, showing waggons being pulled by a horse, and adopted the Latin motto Periculum privatum utilitas publica ("At private risk for public service"). By 23 July 1821 it had decided that the line would be a railway with edge rails, rather than a plateway, and appointed Stephenson to make a fresh survey of the line. Stephenson recommended using malleable iron rails, even though he owned a share of the patent for the alternative cast iron rails, and both types were used. (Note: Malleable iron rails cost £12 10s (Note: Before decimal currency was introduced there were 12 old pence (d) in a shilling (s) and 20s in a pound (£). One penny in 1825 was worth the same in 2025 as approximately 34p, and 1s about £4.04.) and cast iron rails £6 15s per ton, but malleable iron rails could be less than half the weight for the same strength.) Stephenson was assisted by his 18-year-old son Robert during the survey, and by the end of 1821 had reported that a usable line could be built within the bounds of the act of Parliament, but another route would be shorter by 3 miles (5 km) and avoid deep cuttings and tunnels. Overton had kept himself available, but had no further involvement and the shareholders elected Stephenson Engineer on 22 January 1822, with a salary of £660 per year. On 23 May 1822 a ceremony in Stockton celebrated the laying of the first track at St John's Well, the rails 4 ft 8 in (1,422 mm) apart, (Note: Smiles (1904, p. 160) states that early tramroads had rails 4 ft 8 in (1,422 mm) apart, but Tomlinson (1915, pp. 82–83) challenges this, stating that the most common gauge of the early tramroads and waggonways was about 4 ft (1,219 mm), and some, such as the Wylam waggonway, had the rails 5 ft (1,524 mm) apart. The gauge of the S&DR was given in early documents as 4 ft 8 in (1,422 mm), but the distance between the rails was later measured as 4 ft 8 1/2 in (1,435 mm), and this became the standard gauge used by 60 per cent of railways worldwide. The difference of 1/2 inch (13 mm) is a mystery.) the same gauge used by Stephenson on his Killingworth Railway.

Stockton and Darlington Railway Act 1823
- Act of Parliament
- Parliament of the United Kingdom
- Long title: An Act to enable the Stockton and Darlington Railway Company to vary and alter the Line of their Railway, and also the Line or Lines of some of the Branches therefrom, and to make, an additional Branch therefrom, and for altering and enlarging the Powers of the Act passed for making and maintaining the said Railway.
- Citation: 4 Geo. 4. c. xxxiii

Dates
- Royal assent: 23 May 1823

Other legislation
- Repealed by: Stockton and Darlington Railway (Consolidation of Acts, Increase of Capital and Purchase of Middlesbrough Dock) Act 1849

Status: Repealed

Text of statute as originally enacted

Stephenson advocated the use of steam locomotives on the line. Pease visited Killingworth in mid-1822 and the directors visited Hetton colliery railway, on which Stephenson had introduced steam locomotives. A new bill was presented, requesting Stephenson's deviations from the original route and the use of "loco-motives or moveable engines", and this received royal assent on 23 May 1823 as the Stockton and Darlington Railway Act 1823 (4 Geo. 4. c. xxxiii). The line included embankments up to 48 feet (15 m) high, and Stephenson designed an iron truss bridge to cross the River Gaunless. The Skerne Bridge over the River Skerne was designed by the Durham architect Ignatius Bonomi. (Note: The Skerne bridge was shown on the reverse of the Series E five-pound note that featured George Stephenson, issued by the Bank of England between 1990 and 2003. Allen (1974, p. 22) and Tomlinson (1915, pp. 93–95) state that Bonomi was directly appointed by the directors after Stephenson had ignored suggestions to consult him, but Rolt (1984, p. 75) does not mention this.)

In 1823, Stephenson and Pease opened Robert Stephenson and Company, a locomotive works at Forth Street, Newcastle, from which the following year the S&DR ordered two steam locomotives and two stationary engines. On 16 September 1825, with the stationary engines in place, the first locomotive, Locomotion No. 1, left the works, and the following day it was advertised that the railway would open on 27 September 1825.

=== Opening ===
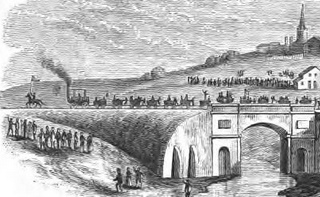
The opening procession of the Stockton and Darlington Railway crosses the Skerne bridge

The cost of building the railway had greatly exceeded the estimates. By September 1825, the company had borrowed £60,000 in short-term loans and needed to start earning an income to ward off its creditors. A railway coach, named Experiment, (Note: Smiles (1904, p. 166) has an image of this railway coach and describes it as "a somewhat uncouth machine", even though the Illustrated London News had discounted in 1875 an earlier publication of Smiles' image, stating that coach used on the opening day was a similar to a road coach. Tomlinson (1915, pp. 109–110) describes the coach as having a table, cushioned seats and carpets, and criticises the Smiles image for the lack of roof seats, having the wheels outside the coach frame and says that the drawing in Smiles does not look like a vehicle that was built for £80 (approximately £6500 in 2025).) arrived on the evening of 26 September 1825 and was attached to Locomotion No. 1, which had been placed on the rails for the first time at Aycliffe Lane station following the completion of its journey by road from Newcastle earlier that same day. Pease, Stephenson and other members of the committee then made an experimental journey to Darlington before taking the locomotive and coach to Shildon in preparation for the opening day, with James Stephenson, George's elder brother, at the controls. On 27 September, between 7 am and 8 am, 12 waggons of coal (Note: These waggons (known as wagons after about 1830) were designed to carry a Newcastle chaldron (pronounced chalder in Newcastle) of coal, about 53 long cwt (5,900 lb; 2,700 kg). This differed from the London chaldron, which was 36 bushels or 25 1/2 long cwt (2,860 lb; 1,300 kg).) were drawn up Etherley North Bank by a rope attached to the stationary engine at the top, and then let down the South Bank to St Helen's Auckland. A waggon of flour bags was attached and horses hauled the train across the Gaunless Bridge to the bottom of Brusselton West Bank, where thousands watched the second stationary engine draw the train up the incline. The train was let down the East Bank to Mason's Arms Crossing at Shildon Lane End, where Locomotion No. 1, Experiment and 21 new coal waggons fitted with seats were waiting.

The directors had allowed room for 300 passengers, but the train left carrying between 450 and 600 people, most travelling in empty waggons but some on top of waggons full of coal. Brakesmen were placed between the waggons, and the train set off, led by a man on horseback with a flag. It picked up speed on the gentle downward slope and reached 10 to 12 miles per hour (16 to 19 km/h), leaving behind men on field hunters (horses) who had tried to keep up with the procession. The train stopped when the waggon carrying the company surveyors and engineers lost a wheel; the waggon was left behind and the train continued. The train stopped again, this time for 35 minutes to repair the locomotive and the train set off again, reaching 15 mph (24 km/h) before it was welcomed by an estimated 10,000 people as it came to a stop at the Darlington branch junction. Eight and a half miles (14 km) had been covered in two hours, and subtracting the 55 minutes accounted by the two stops, it had travelled at an average speed of 8 mph (13 km/h). Six waggons of coal were distributed to the poor, workers stopped for refreshments and many of the passengers from Brusselton alighted at Darlington, to be replaced by others.

Two waggons for the Yarm Band were attached, and at 12:30 pm the locomotive started for Stockton, now hauling 31 vehicles with 550 passengers. On the 5 miles (8 km) of nearly level track east of Darlington the train struggled to reach more than 4 mph (6.4 km/h). At Eaglescliffe near Yarm crowds waited for the train to cross the Stockton to Yarm turnpike. Approaching Stockton, running alongside the turnpike as it skirted the western edge of Preston Park, it gained speed and reached 15 mph (24 km/h) again, before a man clinging to the outside of a waggon fell off and his foot was crushed by the following vehicle. As work on the final section of track to Stockton's quayside was still ongoing, the train halted at the temporary passenger terminus at St John's Well 3 hours, 7 minutes after leaving Darlington. The opening ceremony was considered a success and that evening 102 people sat down to a celebratory dinner at the Town Hall.

=== Early operations ===
The railway that opened in September 1825 was 25 miles (40 km) long and ran from Phoenix Pit, Old Etherley Colliery, to Cottage Row, Stockton; there was also a 1/2 mile (800 m) branch to the depot at Darlington, 1/2 mile (800 m) of the Hagger Leases branch, and a 3/4 mile (1,200 m) branch to Yarm. Most of the track used 28 pounds per yard (13.9 kg/m) malleable iron rails, and 4 miles (6.4 km) of 57 1/2 lb/yd (28.5 kg/m) cast iron rails were used for junctions. The line was single track with four passing loops each mile; square sleepers supported each rail separately so that horses could walk between them. Stone was used for the sleepers to the west of Darlington and oak to the east; Stephenson would have preferred all of them to have been stone, but the transport cost was too high as they were quarried in the Auckland area. The railway opened with the company owing money and unable to raise further loans; Pease advanced money twice early in 1826 so the workers could be paid. By August 1827 the company had paid its debts and was able to raise more money; that month the Black Boy branch opened and construction began on the Croft and Hagger Leases branches. During 1827 shares rose from £120 at the start to £160 at the end.

The route of the Stockton and Darlington Railway in 1827, shown in black, with today's railway lines shown in red

The line was initially used to carry coal to Darlington and Stockton, carrying 10,000 tons (Note: An imperial or long ton is the same as 1.016 metric tonnes and 1.120 short tons, the US customary unit.) in the first three months and earning nearly £2,000. In Stockton, the price of coal dropped from 18 to 12 shillings, and by the beginning of 1827 was 8 shillings 6 pence (8s 6d). At first, the locomotive drivers had been paid a daily wage, but after February 1826 they were paid 1/4d per ton per mile; from this they had to pay assistants and a fireman, and to buy coal for the locomotive. The Stockton and Darlington Railway Act 1821 had received opposition from the owners of collieries on the River Wear who supplied London and feared competition, and it had been necessary to restrict the rate for transporting coal destined for ships to 1/2d per ton per mile, which had been assumed would make the business uneconomic. There was interest from London for 100,000 tons a year, so the company began investigations in September 1825. In January 1826, the first staith (Note: A staith is an elevated platform used to transfer minerals such as coal from railway waggons onto ships.) opened at Stockton, designed so waggons over a ship's hold could discharge coal from the bottom. About 18,500 tons of coal was transported to ships in the year ending June 1827, and this increased to over 52,000 tons the following year, 44.5% of the total carried.

The locomotives were unreliable at first. Soon after opening, Locomotion No. 1 broke a wheel, and it was not ready for traffic until 12 or 13 October; Hope, the second locomotive, arrived in November 1825 but needed a week to ready it for the line – the cast-iron wheels were a source of trouble. Two more locomotives of a similar design arrived in 1826; that August, 16s 9d was spent on ale to motivate the men maintaining the engines. By the end of 1827, the company had also bought Chittaprat from Robert Wilson and Experiment from Stephenson. Timothy Hackworth, locomotive superintendent, used the boiler from the unsuccessful Chittaprat to build the Royal George in the works at Shildon; it started work at the end of November. John Wesley Hackworth later published an account (Note: In an appendix in A Chapter in the History of Railway Locomotion, with Memoir of Timothy Hackworth, etc. 1892. p. 25. John Wesley Hackworth was a descendant of Timothy.) stating that locomotives would have been abandoned were it not for the fact that Pease and Thomas Richardson were partners with Stephenson in the Newcastle works, and that when Timothy Hackworth was commissioned to rebuild Chittaprat it was "as a last experiment" to "make an engine in his own way". Both Tomlinson and Rolt (Note: Compare Tomlinson (1915, pp. 141–142) and Rolt (1984, p. 143)) state this claim was unfounded and the company had shown earlier that locomotives were superior to horses, Tomlinson showing that coal was being moved using locomotives at half the cost of horses. Robert Young (Note: In Young, Robert (1923). Timothy Hackworth and the Locomotive, cited by Kirby.) states that the company was unsure as to the real costs as they reported to shareholders in 1828 that the saving using locomotives was 30 per cent. Young also showed that Pease and Richardson were both concerned about their investment in the Newcastle works and Pease unsuccessfully tried to sell his share to George Stephenson.

New locomotives were ordered from Stephenson's, but the first was too heavy when it arrived in February 1828. It was rebuilt with six wheels and hailed as a great improvement, Hackworth being told to convert the remaining locomotives as soon as possible. In 1828, two locomotive boilers exploded within four months, both killing the driver and both due to the safety valves being left fixed down while the engine was stationary. Horses were also used on the line, and they could haul up to four waggons. The dandy waggon was introduced in mid-1828; it was a small cart at the end of the train that carried the horse downhill, allowing it to rest while the train descended under gravity. The S&DR made their use compulsory from November 1828.

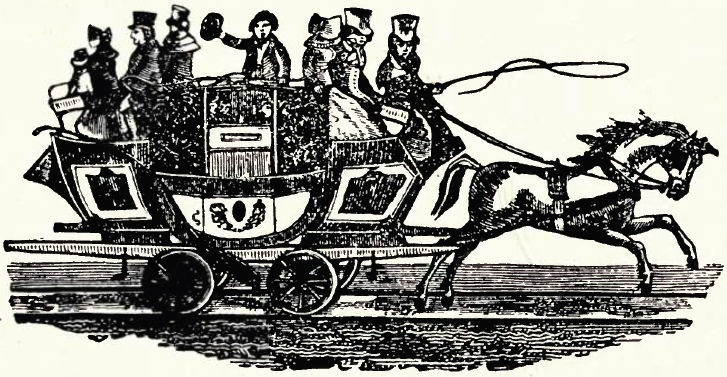
The Union coach as shown in an advertisement

Passenger traffic started on 10 October 1825, after the required licence was purchased, using the Experiment coach hauled by a horse. The coach was initially timetabled to travel from Stockton to Darlington in two hours, with a fare of 1s, and made a return journey four days a week and a one-way journey on Tuesdays and Saturdays. In April 1826, the operation of the coach was contracted for £200 a year; by then the timetabled journey time had been reduced to 1 hour 15 minutes, and passengers were allowed to travel on the outside for 9d. A more comfortable coach, Express, started the same month and charged 1s 6d for travel inside. Innkeepers began running coaches, two to Shildon from July, and the Union, which served the Yarm branch from 16 October. There were no stations: in Darlington the coaches picked up passengers near the north road crossing, whereas in Stockton they picked up at different places on the quay. Between 30,000 and 40,000 passengers were carried between July 1826 and June 1827.

== Founding of Middlesbrough ==
The export of coal had become the railway's main business, but the staiths at Stockton had inadequate storage and the size of ships was limited by the depth of the Tees. A branch from Stockton to Haverton, on the north bank of the Tees, was proposed in 1826, and the engineer Thomas Storey proposed a shorter and cheaper line to Middlesbrough, south of the Tees in July 1827. Later approved by George Stephenson, this plan was ratified by the shareholders on 26 October. The Tees Navigation Company was about to improve the river and proposed that the railway delay application to Parliament, but, despite opposition, at a meeting in January 1828 it was decided to proceed. A more direct northerly route from Auckland to the Tees had been considered since 1819, and the Tees and Weardale Railway had applied unsuccessfully to Parliament for permission for such a line in 1823, 1824 and 1825. This now became a 11 1/2-mile (18.5 km) line linking Simpasture on the S&DR's line near today's Newton Aycliffe station with Haverton and Stockton, via a route that was 6 miles (10 km) shorter than via the route of the S&DR, and named the Clarence Railway in honour of the Duke of Clarence, later King William IV.

Meetings held in Stockton in early 1828 supported the Tees Navigation and the Clarence Railway, but the S&DR received permission for its branch on 23 May 1828 after promising to complete the Hagger Leases Branch and to build a bridge across the Tees at least 72 feet (22 m) wide and 19 feet (5.8 m) above low water, so as not to affect shipping. Two members of the management committee resigned, as they felt that Stockton would be adversely affected by the line, and Meynell, the S&DR chairman, stepped down from leadership. The Clarence Railway was approved a few days later, with the same gauge as the S&DR. The route of the Clarence Railway was afterwards amended to reach Samphire Batts, later known as Port Clarence, and traffic started in August 1833; by the middle of 1834 Port Clarence had opened and 28 miles (45 km) of line was in use. The S&DR charged the 2 1/4d per ton per mile landsale rate for coal it carried the 10 miles (16 km) from the collieries to Simpasture for forwarding to Port Clarence, rather than the lower shipping rate. By July 1834, the Exchequer Loan Commissioners had taken control of the Clarence Railway.

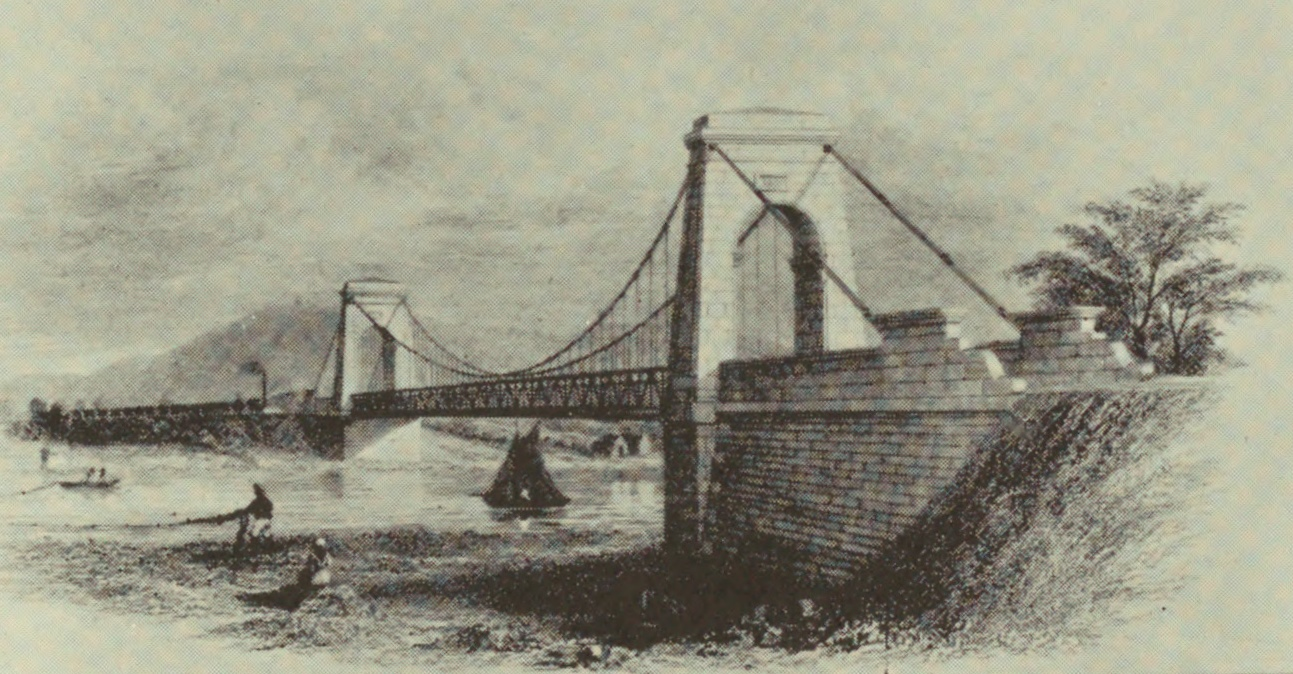
The suspension bridge over the Tees

The Croft branch opened in October 1829. Construction of the suspension bridge across the Tees started in July 1829, but was suspended in October after the Tees Navigation Company pointed out the S&DR had no permission to cross the Old Channel of the Tees. The S&DR prepared to return to Parliament but withdrew after a design for a drawbridge was agreed with the navigation company. The line to Middlesbrough was laid with malleable iron rails weighing 33 lb/yd (16 kg/m), resting on oak blocks. The suspension bridge had been designed to carry 150 tons, but the cast iron retaining plates split when it was tested with just 66 tons and loaded trains had to cross with the waggons split into groups of four linked by a 9-yard-long (8.2 m) chain. For the opening ceremony on 27 December 1830, Globe, a new locomotive designed by Hackworth for passenger trains, hauled people in carriages and waggons fitted with seats across the bridge to the staiths at Port Darlington, which had berths for six ships. Stockton continued to be served by a station on the line to the quay until 1848, when it was replaced by a station on the Middlesbrough line on the other side of the Tees. Before May 1829, Thomas Richardson had bought about 500 acres (200 ha) near Port Darlington, and with Joseph and Edward Pease and others he formed the owners of the Middlesbrough Estate to develop it. Middlesbrough had only a few houses before the coming of the railway, but a year later had a population of over 2,000 and at the 2011 census had over 138,000 people.

== Railway improvements ==
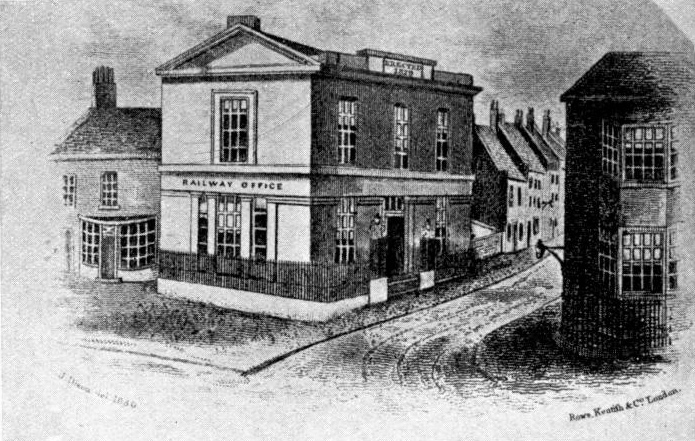
S&DR offices in Darlington

In 1830, the company opened new offices at the corner of Northgate and Union Street in Darlington. Between 1831 and 1832 a second track was laid between Stockton and the foot of Brusselton Bank. Workshops were built at Shildon for the maintenance and construction of locomotives. In 1830 approximately 50 horses shared the traffic with 19 locomotives, but travelled at different speeds, so to help regulate traffic horse-drawn trains were required to operate in groups of four or five. This had led to horses, startled by a passing locomotive and coming off their dandy cart, being run down by the following train. On one occasion a driver fell asleep in the dandy cart of the preceding train and his horse, no longer being led, came to a stop and was run down by a locomotive. The rule book stated that locomotive-hauled trains had precedence over horse-drawn trains, but some horse drivers refused to give way and on one occasion a locomotive had to follow a horse-drawn train for over 2 miles (3 km). The committee decided in 1828 to replace horses with locomotives on the main line, starting with the coal trains, but there was resistance from some colliery owners.

After the S&DR bought out the coach companies in August 1832, a mixed passenger and small goods service began between Stockton and Darlington on 7 September 1833, travelling at 12–14 miles per hour (19–23 km/h); locomotive-hauled services began to Shildon in December 1833 and to Middlesbrough on 7 April 1834. The company had returned the five per cent dividend that had been promised by Edward Pease, and this had increased to eight per cent by the time he retired in 1832. When the treasurer Jonathan Backhouse retired in 1833 to become a Quaker minister, he was replaced by Joseph Pease.

== The way north ==
=== Great North of England Railway ===
The north entrance to Shildon Tunnel, which opened in 1842

On 13 October 1835, the York and North Midland Railway (Y&NMR) was formed to connect York to London by a line to a junction with the planned North Midland Railway. Representatives of the Y&NMR and S&DR met two weeks later and formed the Great North of England Railway (GNER), a line from York to Newcastle that used the route of the 1 1/2-mile (2.4 km) Croft branch at Darlington. The railway was to be built in sections, and to allow both to open at the same time permission for the more difficult line through the hills from Darlington to Newcastle was to be sought in 1836 and a bill for the easier line south of Darlington to York presented the following year. Pease specified a formation wide enough for four tracks, so freight could be carried at 30 miles per hour (48 km/h) and passengers at 60 mph (97 km/h), and George Stephenson had drawn up detailed plans by November.

The act of Parliament for the 34 1/2 miles (55.5 km) from Newcastle to Darlington, the Great North of England Railway Act 1836 (6 & 7 Will. 4. c. cv) was given royal assent on 4 July 1836, but little work had been done by the time the 43 miles (69 km) from Croft to York received permission on 12 July the following year. In August a general meeting decided to start work on the southern section, but construction was delayed, and after several bridges collapsed the engineer Thomas Storey was replaced by Robert Stephenson. The S&DR sold its Croft branch to the GNER, and the railway opened for coal traffic on 4 January 1841 using S&DR locomotives. The railway opened to passengers with its own locomotives on 30 March.

Between November 1841 and February 1842, the S&DR introduced a service between Darlington and Coxhoe, on the Clarence Railway, where an omnibus took passengers the 3 1/2 miles (5.6 km) to the Durham and Sunderland Railway at Shincliffe. Early in 1842, the nominally independent Shildon Tunnel Company opened its 1,225-yard (1,120 m) tunnel through the hills at Shildon to the Wear basin and after laying 2 miles (3.2 km) of track to South Church station, south of Bishop Auckland, opened in May 1842. In 1846, the S&DR installed Alexander Bain's "I and V" electric telegraph to regulate the passage of trains through the tunnel. The S&DR provided a 3 1/4 hour service between Darlington and Newcastle, with a four-horse omnibus from South Church to Rainton Meadows on the Durham Junction Railway, from where trains ran to Gateshead, on the south side of the River Tyne near Newcastle.

=== Railway operations in the 1830s ===
By 1839, the track had been upgraded with rails weighing 64 lb/yd (32 kg/m). The railway had about 30 steam locomotives, most of them six coupled, that ran with four-wheeled tenders with two water butts, each capable of holding 600 imperial gallons (2,700 L; 720 US gal) of water. The line descended from Shildon to Stockton, assisting the trains that carried coal to the docks at a maximum speed of 6 mph (9.7 km/h); the drivers were fined if caught travelling faster than 8 mph (13 km/h), and one was dismissed for completing the forty-mile return journey in 4 1/2 hours. On average there were about 40 coal trains a day, hauling 28 waggons with a weight of 116 tons. There were about 5,000 privately owned waggons, and at any one time about 1,000 stood at Shildon depot.

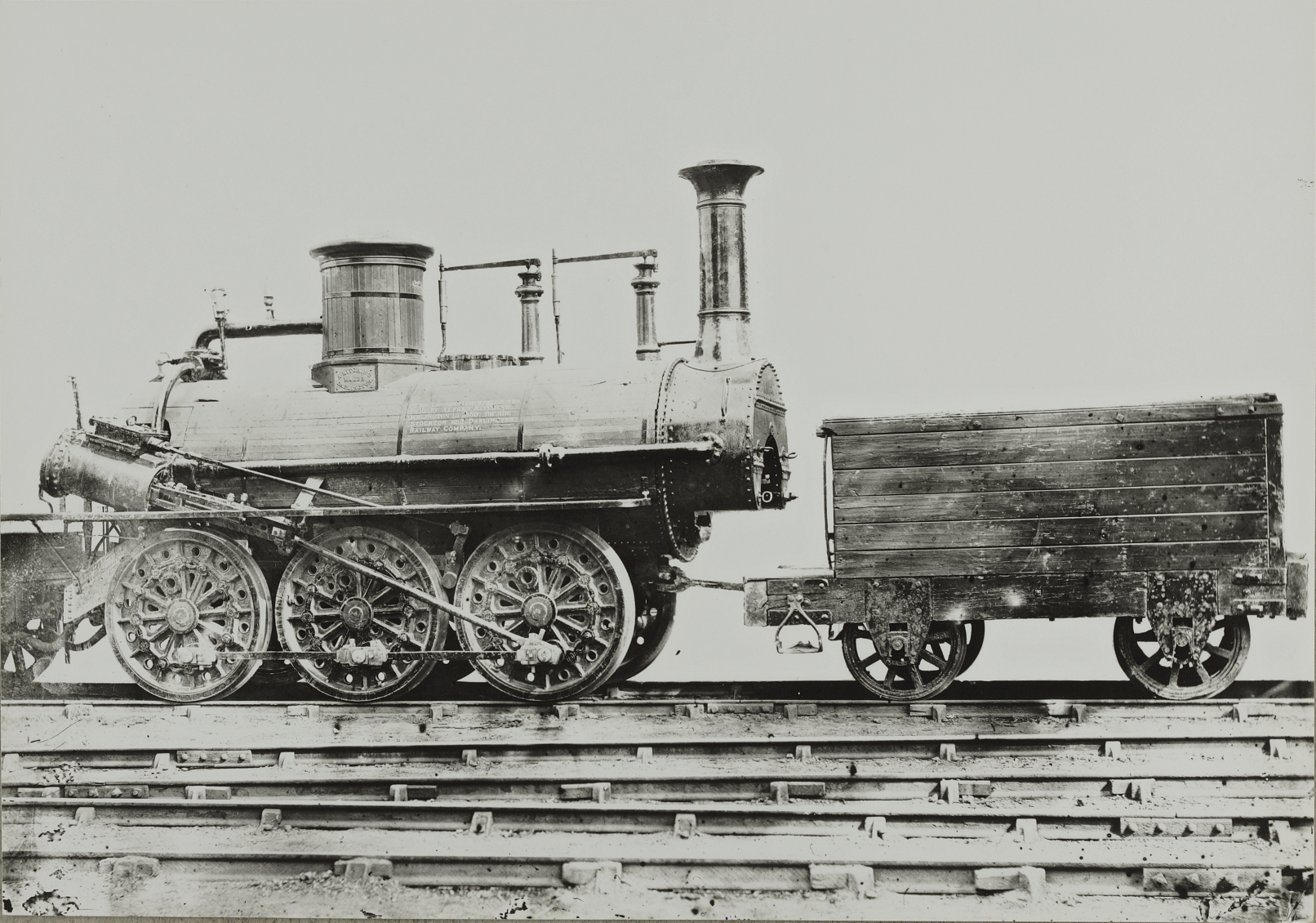
One of several six coupled steam locomotives operated by the railway

The railway had modern passenger locomotives, some with four wheels. There were passenger stations at Stockton, Middlesbrough, Darlington, Shildon and West Auckland, and trains also stopped at Middlesbrough Junction, Yarm Junction, Fighting Cocks and Heighington. Some of the modified road coaches were still in use, but there were also modern railway carriages, some first class with three compartments each seating eight passengers, and second class carriages that seated up to 40. (Note: Passenger accommodation was sometimes classified as inside and outside following the practice on stage-coaches; express trains with premium fares were known as first-class trains. The S&DR introduced third-class accommodation on some trains in 1835 as people unable to afford a second-class ticket had been walking along the tracks.) Luggage and sometimes the guard travelled on the carriage roof; a passenger travelling third class suffered serious injuries after falling from the roof in 1840. Passenger trains averaged 22–25 mph (35–40 km/h), and a speed of 42 mph (68 km/h) was recorded. Over 200,000 passengers were carried in the year to 1 October 1838, and in 1839 there were twelve trains each day between Middlesbrough and Stockton, six trains between Stockton and Darlington, and three between Darlington and Shildon, where a carriage was fitted with Rankine's self-acting brake, taken over the Brussleton Inclines, and then drawn by a horse to St Helen Auckland. The Bradshaw's railway guide for March 1843, after South Church opened, shows five services a day between Darlington and South Church via Shildon, with three between Shildon and St Helens. Also listed were six trains between Stockton and Hartlepool via Seaton over the Clarence Railway and the Stockton and Hartlepool Railway that had opened in 1841.

By this time, Port Darlington had become overwhelmed by the volume of imports and exports and work started in 1839 on Middlesbrough Dock, which had been laid out by William Cubitt, capable of holding 150 ships, and built by resident civil engineer George Turnbull. The suspension bridge across the Tees was replaced by a cast iron bridge on masonry piers in 1841. After three years and an expenditure of £122,000 (equivalent to £9.65m at 2011 prices), the formal opening of the new dock took place on 12 May 1842. The S&DR provided most of the finance, and the dock was absorbed by the company in 1849.

=== Newcastle and Darlington Junction Railway ===
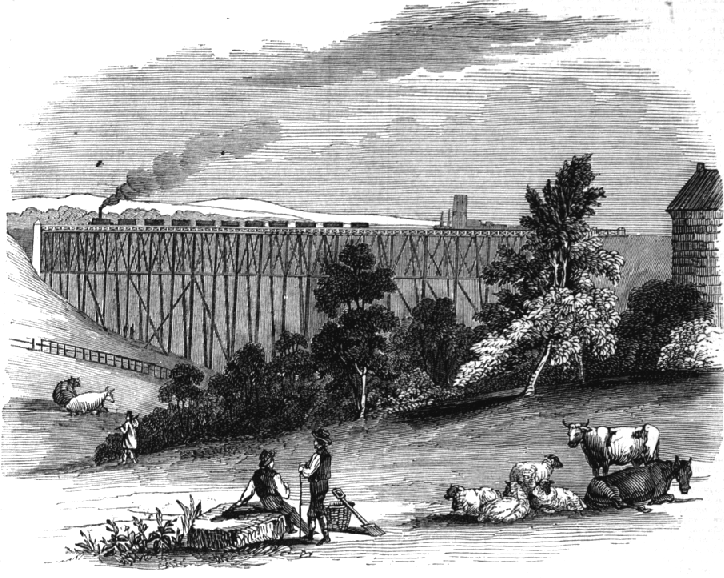
The N&DJR crossed the Sherburn with a timber viaduct.

The GNER had authority for a railway from York to Newcastle; it opened to Darlington in 1841 having spent all of its authorised capital and could not start work on the extension to Newcastle. At the time Parliament was considering the route of a railway between England and Scotland and favoured a railway via the west coast. Railway financier George Hudson chaired a meeting of representatives of north-eastern railways that wished a railway to be built via the east coast. In the 1830s a number of railways had opened in the area between Darlington and Newcastle, and Robert Stephenson was engaged to select a route using these railways as much as possible. The Newcastle and Darlington Junction Railway (N&DJR) differed slightly from the GNER route in the southern section before joining the Durham Junction Railway at Rainton and using the Pontop and South Shields Railway from Washington to Brockley Whins, where a new curve onto the Brandling Junction Railway allowed direct access to Gateshead. This required the construction of 25 1/2 miles (41.0 km) of new line, 9 miles (14 km) less than the GNER route, but trains would need to travel 7 1/2 miles (12.1 km) further.

This route ran parallel to S&DR lines for 5 miles (8.0 km) and Pease argued that it should run over these as it would add only 1 1/2 miles (2.4 km). The bill was presented unchanged to Parliament in 1842, and was opposed by the S&DR. Despite this, the Newcastle and Darlington Junction Railway Act 1842 (5 & 6 Vict. c. lxxx) received royal assent on 18 June 1842, and a second act of Parliament the following year, the Great North of England Railway Act 1843 (6 & 7 Vict. c. viii), secured the deviations from the GNER route in the south recommended by Stephenson. After the opening celebration on 18 June 1844, through services ran from London to Gateshead the following day.

The N&DJR made an offer to lease the GNER and buy it within five years, and GNER shares increased in value by 44 per cent as the N&DJR took over on 1 July 1845; the N&DJR became part of the larger York, Newcastle and Berwick Railway (YN&BR) in 1847.

== Wear Valley Railway ==
Bishop Auckland and Weardale Railway Act 1837
- Act of Parliament
- Parliament of the United Kingdom
- Long title: An Act for incorporating certain Persons for the making and maintaining a Railway from near the Black Boy Branch of the Stockton and Darlington Railway in the Township of Saint Andrew Auckland to or near to Wilton Park Colliery, with a Branch therefrom, all in the County of Durham, to be called "The Bishop Auckland and Weardale Railway."
- Citation: 7 Will. 4 & 1 Vict. c. cxxii

Dates
- Royal assent: 15 July 1837

Other legislation
- Repealed by: Stockton and Darlington Railway Amalgamation Act 1858

Status: Repealed

The Wear Valley Railway in 1847

The Bishop Auckland and Weardale Railway (BA&WR) received permission in the Bishop Auckland and Weardale Railway Act 1837 (7 Will. 4 & 1 Vict. c. cxxii) of July 1837 to build an 8 1/4-mile (13.3 km) line from South Church to Crook. The line opened on 8 November 1843 with a station at Bishop Auckland.

The Stanhope and Tyne Railway, a 33 3/4-mile (54.3 km) line between South Shields and Stanhope had opened in 1834. Steam locomotives worked the section east of Annfield, and in the western section inclines were worked by stationary engines or gravity, with horses hauling waggons over level track. The lime kilns and the line between Stanhope and Carrhouse closed in 1840, and with the Stanhope to Annfield section losing money, the insolvent railway company was dissolved on 5 February 1841. The northern section became the Pontop and South Shields Railway and the southern section from Stanhope to Carrhouse was bought by the newly formed Derwent Iron Company at Consett, renamed the Wear and Derwent Railway, and used to transport limestone from quarries in the Stanhope area to its works at Consett. The Weardale Extension Railway ran from Waskerley on the Wear and Derwent Railway to Crook on the BA&WR and included the Sunniside Incline worked by a stationary engine. Sponsored by the Derwent Iron Company, the 10-mile (16 km) line was built by the S&DR and opened on 16 May 1845.

A passenger service started to Hownes Gill and Stanhope (Crawley) on 1 September 1845; the Stanhope service was withdrawn at the end of 1846. Travelling north from Crook the carriages and waggons were drawn up the Sunniside Incline, a locomotive hauled the mixed train to Waskerley Park Junction, then they were let down Nanny Mayor's Incline and a locomotive took them forward. When returning, regulations required that the carriages run loose down the Sunniside Incline and they were let to run into Crook station, controlled by the guard using the carriage brakes. Later, a 730 feet (220 m) viaduct replaced the two inclines at Hownes Gill ravine on 1 July 1858. A deviation replacing Nanny's Mayor's Incline, as well as a curve that allowed trains from Crook direct access to Rowley, was opened for freight on 23 May 1859 and for passenger traffic on 4 July 1859.

Middlesbrough and Redcar Railway Act 1845
- Act of Parliament
- Parliament of the United Kingdom
- Long title: An Act for making a Railway from Middlesbro' to or near the Town of Redcar in the North Riding of the County of York. to be called "The Middlesbro' and Redcar Railway."
- Citation: 8 & 9 Vict. c. cxxvii

Dates
- Royal assent: 21 July 1845

Wear Valley Railway Act 1845
- Act of Parliament
- Parliament of the United Kingdom
- Long title: An Act for making a Railway, to be called "The Wear Valley Railway," from and out of the Bishop Auckland and Weardale Railway to Frosterley, with a Branch terminating at or near Bishopley Crag in Stanhope in Weardale, all in the County of Durham.
- Citation: 8 & 9 Vict. c. clii

Dates
- Royal assent: 31 July 1845

Other legislation
- Repealed by: Stockton and Darlington Railway Amalgamation Act 1858

Status: Repealed

Text of statute as originally enacted

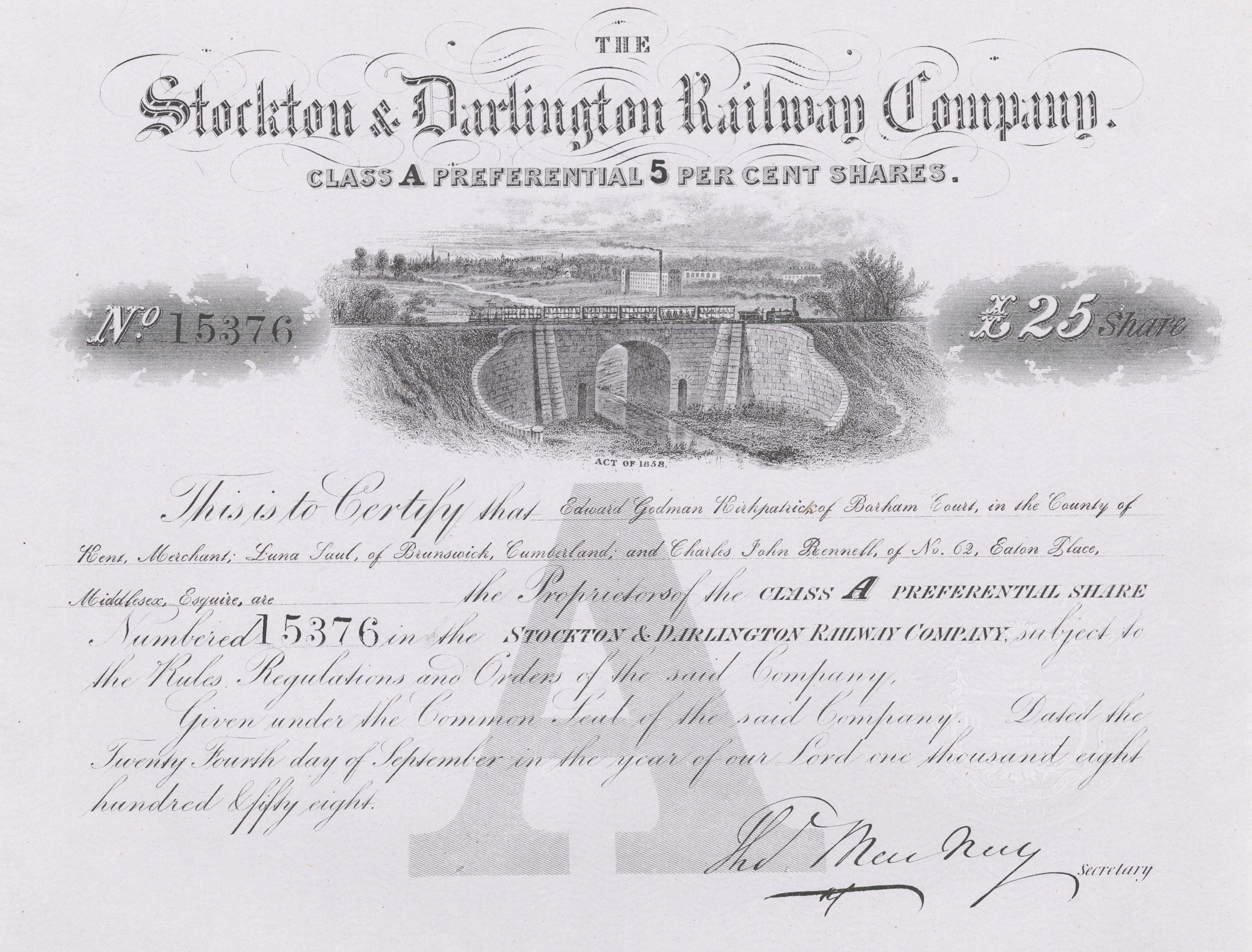
Preferential share certificate of the Stockton and Darlington Railway Company, issued 24 September 1858

The Middlesbrough and Redcar Railway, a short extension to Redcar, received permission on 21 July 1845 in the Middlesbrough and Redcar Railway Act 1845 (8 & 9 Vict. c. cxxvii). The line branched off before the Middlesbrough terminus, which was closed and a new through station opened with the line on 4 June 1846. Also authorised in July 1845, by the Wear Valley Railway Act 1845 (8 & 9 Vict. c. clii), was the Wear Valley Railway, a 12-mile (19 km) line from the Bishop Auckland and Weardale line to Frosterley. The line opened on 3 August 1847, and the act also gave the S&DR permission for the Bishopley branch, over which 500,000 tons of limestone travelled in 1868.

Wear Valley Railway Act 1847
- Act of Parliament
- Parliament of the United Kingdom
- Long title: An Act for enabling the Wear Valley Railway Company to purchase or lease the Bishop Auckland and Weardale Railway, the Wear and Derwent Railway, the Weardale Extension Railway, and the Shildon Tunnel, and to raise an additional Sum of Money; and for other Purposes.
- Citation: 10 & 11 Vict. c. ccxcii

Dates
- Royal assent: 22 July 1847

Text of statute as originally enacted

Just before the line opened on 22 July 1847, the Wear Valley Railway absorbed the Shildon Tunnel, Bishop Auckland and Weardale Railway, Weardale Extension Railway, and Wear and Derwent Railway by the Wear Valley Railway Act 1847 (10 & 11 Vict. c. ccxcii) and then the S&DR leased the Wear Valley Railway and Middlesbrough and Redcar Railways for 999 years. This required a payment of £47,000 each year, exceeding the S&DR's net revenue; traffic from the Derwent Iron Company was reduced during a period of financial difficulty and the Black Boy colliery switched to sending its coal to Hartlepool. No dividend was paid in 1848 and the next few years; lease payments were made out of reserves. The S&DR announced a bill in November 1848 to permit a lease by and amalgamation with the YN&BR, but this was withdrawn after the YN&BR share price crashed and its chairman Hudson resigned after questions were raised about his share dealings. In 1850 the S&DR had share capital of £250,000 but owed £650,000, most of this without the authority of Parliament until 1849; the debt was converted into shares in 1851.

=== Frosterly and Stanhope Railway ===
Frosterly and Stanhope Railway Act 1861
- Act of Parliament
- Parliament of the United Kingdom
- Long title: An Act to authorize the making of a Railway from the Stockton and Darlington Railway at or near the Frosterly Station to Newlandside near Stanhope, with a Road Approach from Stanhope, all in the County of Durham; and for authorizing Working Arrangements with the Stockton and Darlington Railway Company; and for other Purposes.
- Citation: 24 & 25 Vict. c. lxxii

Dates
- Royal assent: 28 June 1861

Frosterly and Stanhope Railway Act 1862
- Act of Parliament
- Parliament of the United Kingdom
- Long title: An Act to authorize a Deviation of Part of the authorized Line of the Frosterly and Stanhope Railway, to construct a new Branch and other Works, to abandon Portions of authorized Line and Approach to Stanhope, to raise additional Capital, amend and repeal Acts; and for other Purposes.
- Citation: 25 & 26 Vict. c. xl

Dates
- Royal assent: 3 June 1862

The Wear Valley Railway was extended in 1862 from Frosterley to Stanhope. by the Frosterly and Stanhope Railway (F&SR), authorised by the Frosterly and Stanhope Railway Act 1861 (24 & 25 Vict. c. lxxii).

== Cleveland iron ore ==
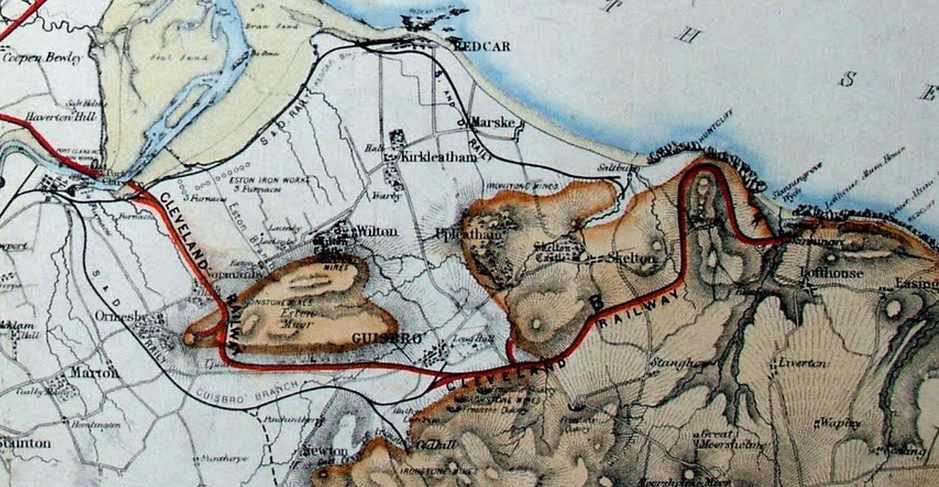
The railways in Cleveland in 1863, the Cleveland Railway shown in red

In mid-1850, Henry Bolckow and John Vaughan discovered a seam of iron ore at Eston. They opened a mine, laid a branch line to the Middlesbrough and Redcar Railway and started hauling ironstone over the S&DR to their blast furnaces west of Bishop Auckland. By 1851, Derwent Iron had opened a mine in the area and began moving ironstone 54 miles (87 km) to Consett, and the S&DR had paid the arrears on its debt and was able to pay a dividend the following year, albeit only 4 per cent; between 1849 and 1853 the traffic more than doubled. (Note: In the year ending June 1849, they carried 21 million ton miles, which rose to 48 million in the year ending December 1853. Ironstone shipments increased from 28,000 tons in the six months before December 1849 to 231,000 tons in the six months before December 1852.)

In 1852, the Leeds Northern Railway (LNR) built a line from Northallerton to a junction with the Stockton to Hartlepool line and a section of the route ran parallel to the S&DR alongside the Yarm to Stockton Road. The S&DR was originally on the east side of the road, but the LNR built its line with four tracks on the other side of the road, leasing two to the S&DR for a rental of 1 shilling a year. On 25 January 1853, the LNR and S&DR opened a joint station at Eaglescliffe with an island platform between the tracks, and one side was used by S&DR trains and the other by the LNR. Rather than allow trains to approach the platform line from either direction, the Board of Trade inspecting officer ruled that trains approaching on a line without a platform must first pass through and then reverse into the platform line.

Middlesbrough and Guisborough Railway Act 1852
- Act of Parliament
- Parliament of the United Kingdom
- Long title: An Act for making a Railway from the Middlesbrough and Redcar Railway near Middlesbrough to or near to Guisbrough, with Branches to the Cleveland Hills, and for making Arrangements with the Stockton and Darlington Railway Company.
- Citation: 15 & 16 Vict. c. lxxiii

Dates
- Royal assent: 17 June 1852

Other legislation
- Repealed by: Stockton and Darlington Railway Amalgamation Act 1858

Status: Repealed

Text of statute as originally enacted

The Middlesbrough and Guisborough Railway, with two branches into the iron-rich hills, was approved by Parliament in the Middlesbrough and Guisborough Railway Act 1852 (15 & 16 Vict. c. lxxiii) on 17 June 1852; Pease had to guarantee dividends to raise the finance needed. The 9 1/2-mile (15.3 km) single-track railway was worked by the S&DR, and opened to minerals on 11 November 1853 and passengers on 25 February 1854. With electric telegraph installed between stations, passenger trains were not permitted to leave a station until confirmation had been received that the line was clear.

Stockton and Darlington Railway Amalgamation Act 1858
- Act of Parliament
- Parliament of the United Kingdom
- Long title: An Act for the Amalgamation of the Stockton and Darlington, the Wear Valley, the Middlesbrough and Redcar, the Middlesbrough and Guisbrough, and the Darlington and Barnard Castle Railway Companies; and for regulating the Capital and Borrowing Powers of the Stockton and Darlington Railway Company formed by the Amalgamation; and for other Purposes.
- Citation: 21 & 22 Vict. c. cxvi

Dates
- Royal assent: 23 July 1858

By 1857, a blast furnace had opened close to the Durham coalfield on the north side of the Tees. Backed by the rival West Hartlepool Harbour and Railway, the Durham and Cleveland Union Railway proposed a line from the mines in Skinningrove and Staithes, via Guisborough and a bridge over the Middlesbrough and Redcar Railway to a jetty at Cargo Fleet, from where a ferry would carry the ore across the Tees to the blast furnaces. When the proposal was before Parliament the S&DR suggested that their Middlesbrough and Redcar could be extended to Saltburn, and the Tees crossed by a swing bridge. The Cleveland Railway received permission for a line from Skinningrove as far as Guisborough, and the S&DR permission for an extension to Saltburn and a branch to a mine at Skelton. This Stockton and Darlington Railway Amalgamation Act 1858 (21 & 22 Vict. c. cxvi) also authorised the merger of the S&DR with the railways it held on lease.

An application to Parliament for a jetty in the following year was unsuccessful, but in 1860 the Upsall, Normanby and Ormesby Railway started building a line with access to the river, the S&DR claim of exclusive rights to the foreshore having been rejected. The jetty was also opposed by the Tees Conservancy Commissioners and they moored barges along the foreshore to obstruct construction. In what became known as the Battle of the Tees, a fight broke out when a steam tug sent by the commissioners interrupted men moving the barges. The barges were successfully moved, but a more serious fight developed the following night when three of the commissioners' steam tugs arrived. The police then kept watch on the works until they were finished.

Henry Pease, a S&DR director and Quaker, visited his brother Joseph in mid-1859 at his house by the sea at Marske-by-the-Sea. Returning late for dinner, he explained he had walked to Saltburn, then a group of fisherman's cottages, where he had had a "sort of prophetic vision" of a town with gardens. With other S&DR directors he planned the town, with gardens and Zetland Hotel by the station, and bought a house at 5 Britannia Terrace, where he stayed for a few weeks every summer. The extension opened in 1861, a station on the through line replacing the terminus at Redcar.

== Over Stainmore ==
A railway to serve Barnard Castle, from the S&DR at a junction near North Road station and along the River Tees, was proposed in 1852; this route bypassed as far as possible the Duke of Cleveland's estate, as he had opposed an earlier railway. An application that year failed, but the Darlington and Barnard Castle Railway Act 1854 (17 & 18 Vict. c. cxv) was given royal assent on 3 July 1854 and the 15 1/4-mile (24.5 km) railway opened on 8 July 1856.

The SD&LUR viaduct over the Tees Valley in 1858

Cleveland iron ore is high in phosphorus and needs to be mixed with purer ores, such as those on the west coast in Cumberland and Lancashire. In the early 1850s, this ore was travelling the long way round over the Newcastle and Carlisle Railway to the Barrow-in-Furness area, and Durham coke was returning. Both the South Durham and Lancashire Union Railway (SD&LUR) and the Eden Valley Railway (EVR) companies were formed on 20 September 1856. Taking advantage of the new railway at Barnard Castle, the SD&LUR crossed the Pennines via Kirkby Stephen to meet the West Coast Main Line (WCML) at Tebay, on the section then controlled by the Lancaster and Carlisle Railway (L&CR), and also linked Barnard Castle with West Auckland. The EVR was a branch from Kirkby Stephen to the WCML near Penrith via Appleby. The routes were surveyed by Thomas Bouch and SD&LUR received permission on 13 July 1857. The EVR route followed the east bank of the River Eden, a mile longer than a more expensive route on the west bank, and the Eden Valley Railway Act 1858 (21 & 22 Vict. c. xiv) received royal assent on 21 May 1858.

Bouch had laid out an economical route that followed the contours and avoided tunnels, but there were formidable gradients up to the 1,370-foot-high (420 m) Stainmore Summit. Land for two tracks was purchased, and a single track line was laid; valleys were crossed by viaducts, three made from wrought iron, including the Belah Viaduct, 1,040 feet (320 m) long and 196 feet (60 m) high. A new station was built to replace the terminus at Barnard Castle. A mineral train ran between Barnard Castle and Barras on 26 March 1861, and mineral traffic worked through to Tebay from 4 July 1861. There was an opening ceremony on 7 August 1861 and the SD&LUR west of Barnard Castle opened to passengers the following day. Two 4-4-0 locomotives with enclosed cabs had been built for the line in 1860 by Stephenson and Co, and the S&DR worked traffic from the start: two return services a day were provided for passengers. The EVR opened to mineral traffic on 8 April 1862 and passengers on 9 June 1862, to the south-facing junction at Clifton (later Clifton and Lowther). The S&DR had presented a bill in 1861 to provide better connections for passengers on the WCML by extending the line up to Penrith, and to link up with the Cockermouth, Keswick and Penrith Railway to provide access for mineral traffic to Cumberland. The L&CR agreed to allow the S&DR running rights over its line and services were extended to Penrith from 1 August 1863.

== Progress and amalgamation ==
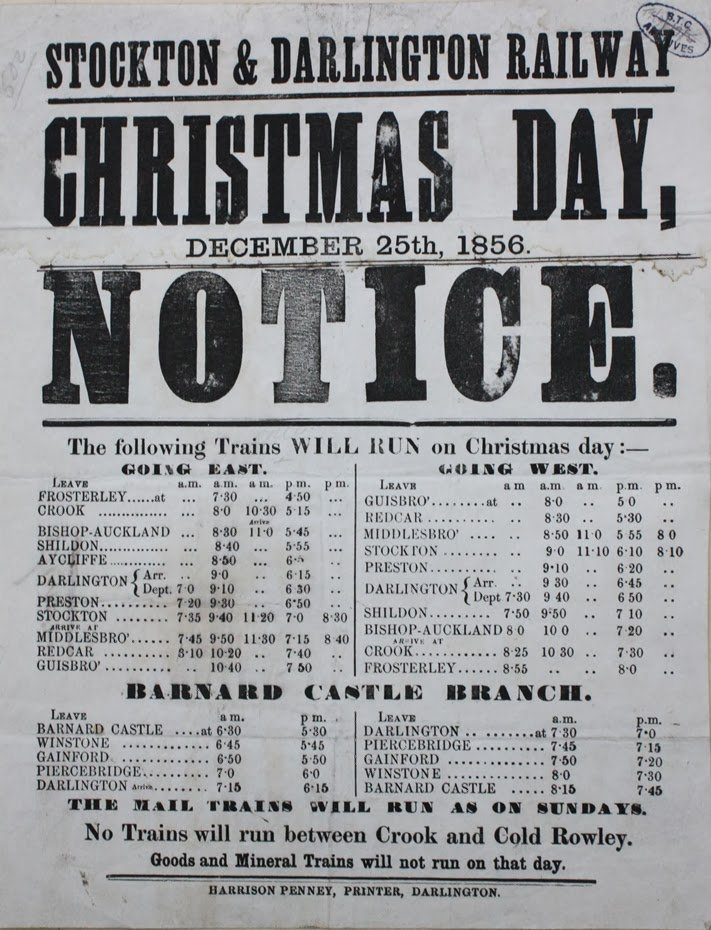
Christmas Day timetable for 1856

In 1854, there were five or six trains a day between Darlington and Redcar and three a day between Darlington and Frosterley. Travelling at average speeds of 19–24 miles per hour (31–39 km/h), passengers were charged from 1d per mile for third class to 2.2d per mile for first. Horses were still used on trains in the mid-1850s: a horse-drawn coach was still independently operated between Middlesbrough and Stockton in 1854 on Sundays, as the only S&DR services that run on that day were the mail trains, and locomotives replaced horses on passenger trains to West Auckland in 1856. (Note: Kirby (2002, pp. 94–95) states that these were the last horses to be used on the line, but Allen (1974, p. 112) states that a horse-drawn four compartment railway carriage operated between Stockton and Middlesbrough until 1864; Tomlinson (1915, p. 529) is unclear.) The S&DR opened a carriage works south of Darlington North Road station in 1853 and later it built a locomotive works nearby to replace its works at Shildon. Designed by William Bouch, who had taken over from Hackworth as Locomotive Supervisor in 1840, it completed its first locomotive in 1864. In 1858 the Brusselton Inclines were bypassed by a line from the north end of Shildon Tunnel; the same year a passenger service started on the Hagger Leases branch and a mineral line opened from Crook via two inclines to Waterhouse. The section of the SD&LUR between West Auckland and Barnard Castle opened for minerals in July 1863 and passengers on 1 August 1863, together with a direct line from Bishop Auckland to West Auckland. Stations at Evenwood and Cockfield replaced stations on the Hagger Leases branch.

Stockton and Darlington Railway (Amalgamation) Act 1862
- Act of Parliament
- Parliament of the United Kingdom
- Long title: An Act for the Amalgamation of the South Durham and Lancashire Union and Eden Valley Railway Companies with the Stockton and Darlington Railway Company; for the Transfer to the last-named Company of the Frosterly and Stanhope Railway; and for other Purposes.
- Citation: 25 & 26 Vict. c. cvi

Dates
- Royal assent: 30 June 1862

Text of statute as originally enacted

The seal of the North Eastern Railway

In 1859, a company had been formed to link the Newcastle and Carlisle Railway with the S&DR via the Derwent Valley; by 1860 this had grown into the Newcastle, Derwent and Weardale Railway, which now bypassed the S&DR and linked with the SD&LUR, and the North British and London and North Western (LNWR) railways were providing two-thirds of the capital. The LNWR proposed to build warehouses in Hartlepool and buy shares in the West Hartlepool Harbour and Railway. The North Eastern Railway (NER), formed in 1854 by amalgamation, at the time was the largest railway company in the country and controlled the East Coast Main Line from Knottingley, south of York, through Darlington to Berwick-upon-Tweed. When they approached the S&DR with a proposal to merge, the directors deciding they preferred a merger with the NER than eventually becoming part of the LNWR, entered negotiations. Opposed by the NER, the Newcastle, Derwent and Weardale Railway bill was approved by the House of Commons in 1861, but the line was eventually rejected by the House of Lords. The SD&LUR, EVR and F&SR were absorbed by the S&DR via the Stockton and Darlington Railway (Amalgamation) Act 1862 (25 & 26 Vict. c. cvi) on 30 June 1862.

North-eastern and Stockton and Darlington Railways Amalgamation Act 1863
- Act of Parliament
- Parliament of the United Kingdom
- Long title: An Act for the Amalgamation of the Stockton and Darlington Railway Company with the North-eastern Railway Company; and for other Purposes.
- Citation: 26 & 27 Vict. c. cxxii

Dates
- Royal assent: 13 July 1863

Text of statute as originally enacted

With 200 route miles (320 km) of line and about 160 locomotives, the Stockton and Darlington Railway became part of the North Eastern Railway on 13 July 1863. Due to a clause in the North-eastern and Stockton and Darlington Railways Amalgamation Act 1863 (26 & 27 Vict. c. cxxii) the railway was managed as the independent Darlington Section until 1876, when the lines became the NER's Central Division. After the restoration of the dividend in 1851, by the end of 1854 payments had recovered to 8 per cent and then had not dropped below 7 1/2 per cent.

== Later history ==
The NER had built a branch in the late 1850s from Durham to Bishop Auckland, but used a separate station in the town until December 1867, when all services began to use the S&DR station. The Sunniside Incline was replaced by a deviation, albeit with gradients of 1 in 51 and 1 in 52, which opened for mineral traffic on 10 April 1867 and for passengers on 2 March 1868; after 1868 trains on this line were extended to serve Benfieldside station (later known as Blackhill and then Consett). In Cleveland, a branch from Nunthorpe to Battersby opened on 1 June 1864; passengers were carried from 1 April 1868. A branch from Barnard Castle to Middleton-in-Teesdale opened on 12 May 1868.

The locomotive works at Darlington operated independently under Bouch until 1875, the locomotives having been renumbered by the NER a few years earlier. A variety of locomotives were used, the most common type were the 0-6-0s used on mineral trains. Later locomotives were of the Stephenson long boilered type. Most passenger locomotives were 2-4-0s, though some were 2-2-2s. Bouch designed two 4-4-0 locomotives for the line over Stainmore in 1860, and another fourteen with this wheel arrangement had been built by 1874. S&DR services and those on the ECML called at different stations in Darlington until 1887, when S&DR trains were diverted through a rebuilt Darlington Bank Top station, rejoining the route to Stockton from a junction south of Darlington and a new line to Oak Tree Junction. An extension from Stanhope to Wearhead opened in 1895, and the line over Stainmore to Tebay was doubled by the end of the century.

The former S&DR, shown in red, as part of the larger NER network of 1904

From 1913 former S&DR lines were electrified with 1,500 VDC overhead lines and electric locomotives hauled coal trains between Shildon and Erimus Marshalling Yard, which had opened in 1908 between Middlesbrough and Thornaby. The trains took the former S&DR line from Shildon to Simpasture Junction, joining the former Clarence Railway line to Carlton, where a later line allowed access to the Stockton to Middlesbrough extension. The locomotives operated for 20 years, but then coal traffic had reduced, which made it uneconomical to maintain the electrification system.

As a result of the Railways Act 1921, on 1 January 1923 the North Eastern Railway became the North Eastern area of the London and North Eastern Railway (LNER). The passenger service was withdrawn north of Tow Law on 1 May 1939. Britain's railways were nationalised on 1 January 1948 and the lines were placed under the control of British Railways. In the early 1950s control was split between the North Eastern and London Midland regions with Kirkby Stephen as the boundary. Local passenger trains were withdrawn between Kirkby Stephen and Tebay on 1 December 1952. The service along Weardale was withdrawn on 29 June 1953 and services north of Crook on 11 June 1956.

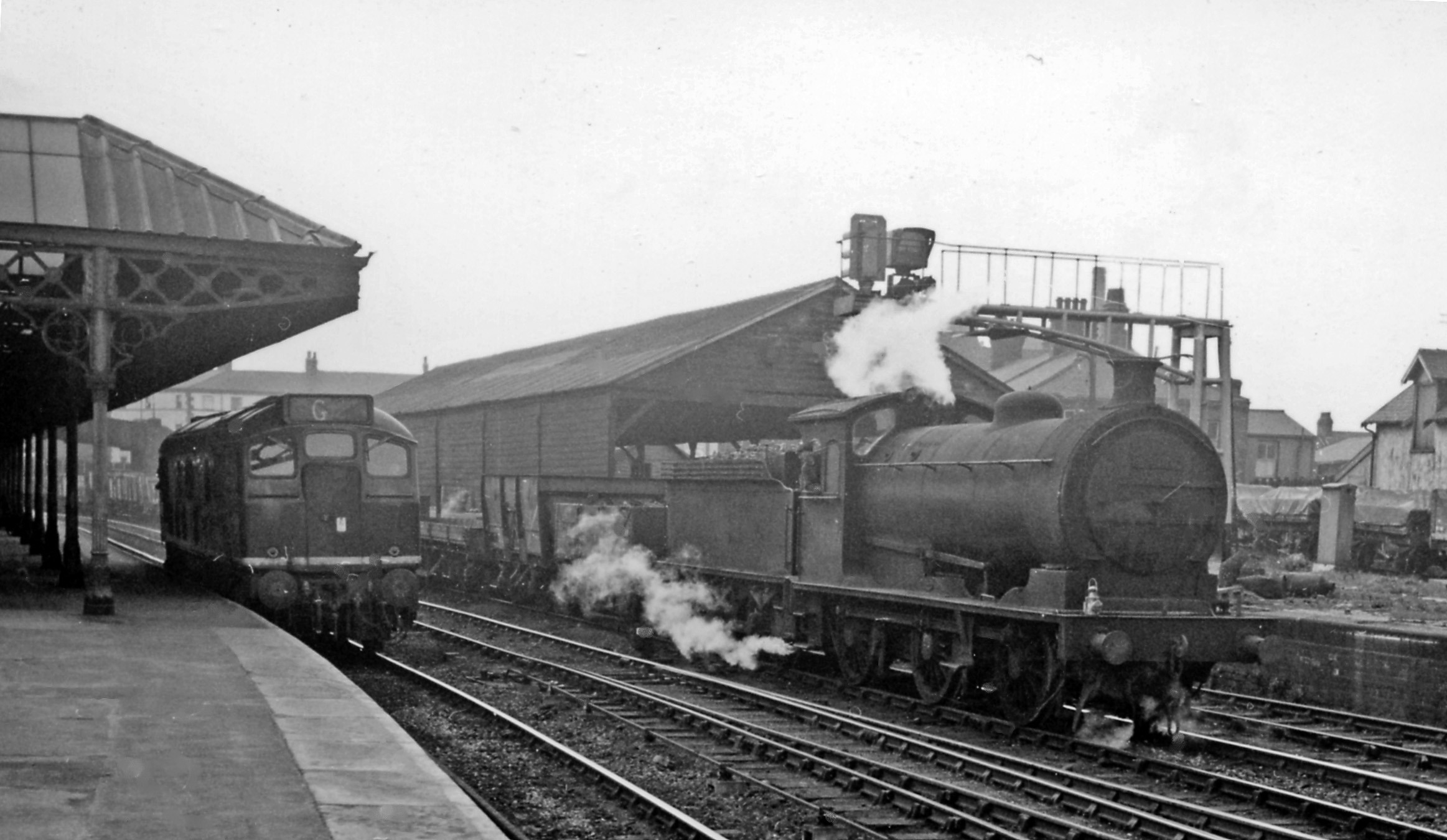
A diesel locomotive stands at Thornaby station in 1961

The 1955 Modernisation Plan, known formally as the "Modernisation and Re-Equipment of the British Railways", was published in December 1954. With the aim of increasing speed and reliability steam trains were replaced with electric and diesel traction. From 1954 diesel multiple units took over passenger services in the north east except those on the ECML, and were introduced to the line over Stainmore in February 1958. The passenger service was withdrawn between Barnard Castle and Penrith on 20 January 1962, and between Bishop Auckland and Barnard Castle on 12 June 1962.

In 1963, Richard Beeching published his report The Reshaping of British Railways, which recommended closing the network's least used stations and lines. This included the remaining former S&DR lines except for the line between Darlington and Saltburn via Stockton and Middlesbrough. Passenger service between Nunthorpe and Guisborough was withdrawn in 1964; the service between Middlesbrough and Nunthorpe was retained. The line between Darlington and Barnard Castle and the branch to Middleton-in-Teesdale were closed to passengers on 30 November 1964. Trains were withdrawn north of Bishop Auckland on 8 March 1965, but the passenger service to Bishop Auckland was saved because of regional development concerns.

== Accidents and incidents ==
- On 5 March 1827, an unnamed woman described as "a blind American beggar" was fatally injured by a train on the railway. This was the first recorded death due to a railway locomotive, coming three years before the more widely reported death of William Huskisson at the Opening of the Liverpool and Manchester Railway.
- On 19 March 1828, the boiler of locomotive No. 5 exploded at Simpasture Junction. One of the two firemen was killed, the other severely scalded. The driver (George Stephenson's older brother) was unharmed.
- On 1 July 1828, the boiler of Locomotion No. 1 exploded at Aycliffe Lane station, killing the driver.
- On 4 April 1865 at Hartburn (Stockton), the 3:55 pm passenger train from Darlington to Saltburn collided with some chaldron wagons which had become detached from a Shildon to Middlesbrough coal train. Though this was not a serious accident it was to result in the S&DR adopting the block system, well before their colleagues at the NER headquarters in York felt this to be necessary. At a conference the next day attended by several company officials including Thomas MacNay and William Bouch it was noted that one of the options to achieve greater security was "to adopt the 'block' system of telegraph at intervals of 2 or 3 miles; that is not to allow an engine to pass any of such stations until it has been signalled that the previous train was past the station to which it was approaching."

== Anniversary celebrations ==
The Exhibition of the Locomotives as shown in the Illustrated London News in 1875

The Stockton and Darlington was not the first railway and a train had previously carried passengers, but its opening in 1825 was seen as proof of the effectiveness of steam railways as a means of public transport. (Note: The Surrey Iron Railway was the first public railway in 1801, a locomotive hauled a coach in Merthyr Tydfil in 1804 and they were being used commercially by the Middleton Colliery in 1812; passengers were carried on the Kilmarnock & Troon Railway in 1818.) A jubilee was held on 27 and 28 September 1875 to celebrate the fiftieth anniversary of the opening of the world's first steam operated public railway: the Darlington North Road workshops housed a locomotive exhibition, a statue of Joseph Pease was unveiled in Darlington, his portrait presented to the Darlington Corporation and a banquet held. Fifty years later centenary celebrations were held in July to allow guests from foreign countries visiting the International Railway Congress to take part. An exhibition of rolling stock at the new Faverdale Wagon Works in Darlington was opened by the Duke and Duchess of York (later King George VI and the Queen Mother). The following day the royal couple watched as procession of locomotives passed between Stockton and Oak Tree Junction, starting with a Hetton Colliery locomotive that had been built in 1822 and finishing with a replica train of ten chaldron waggons and "the company's coach" hauled by Locomotive No.1 propelled by a petrol engine in a specially built tender.

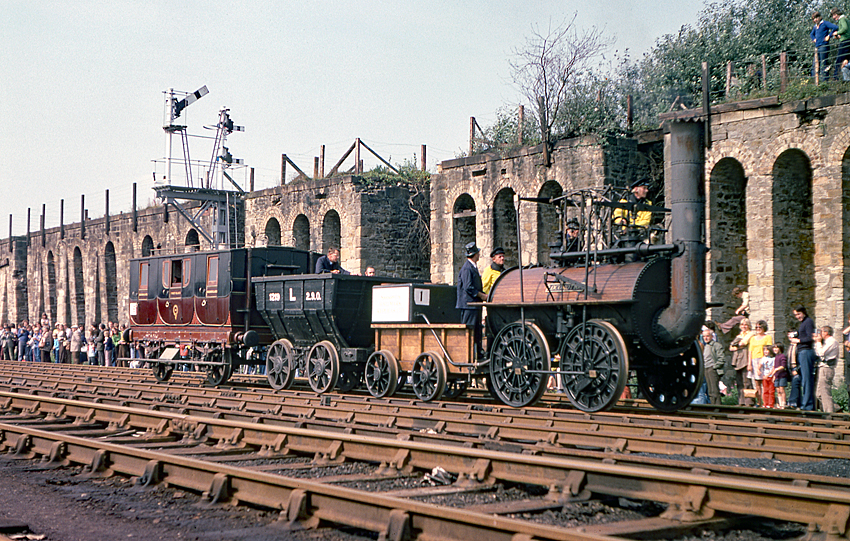
Locomotion No 1 at Shildon, 1975

A festival was held in Belle Vue, Manchester on 27 September 1925, a Sunday to allow railwaymen to attend, where a pageant showed how transport had changed through time, beginning with a group of ancient Britons dragging a log with their belongings on top and ending with Stephenson's Rocket; another procession included Locomotion No.1, propelled by its tender, and more modern locomotives. On 31 August 1975, to celebrate the 150th anniversary, a cavalcade was held between Shildon and Heighington, where a replica of Locomotion headed a procession of locomotives, which was completed by the prototype high-speed train. In the same year the National Railway Museum opened in York, combining exhibits from the former LNER museum in York, which had opened after the 1875 festivities, and from the National Transport Museum at Clapham. The replica made a three-day journey from Darlington to Stockton for the railway's 200th anniversary in 2025.

== Legacy ==
=== Heritage ===
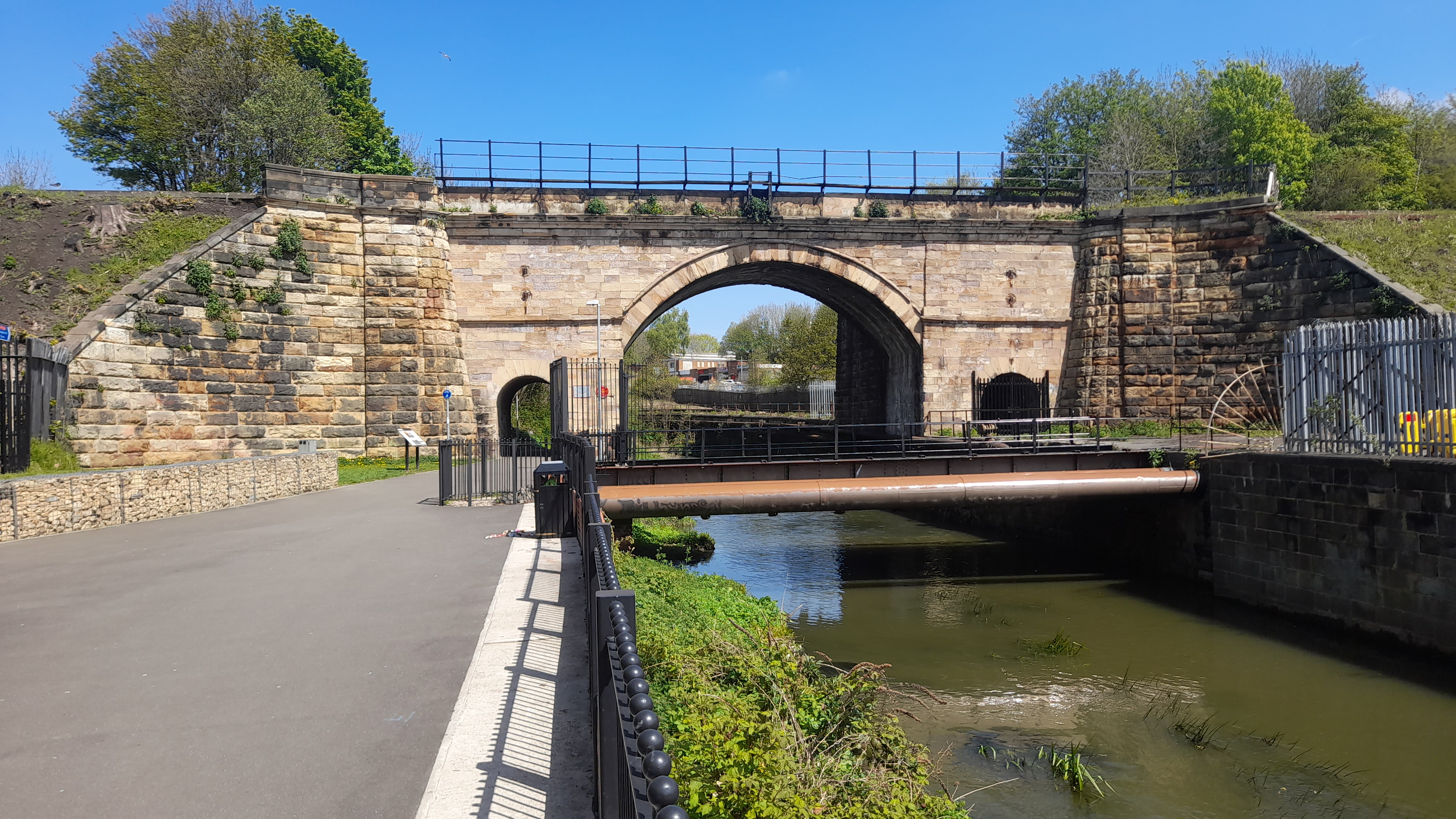
Skerne Bridge

At North Road, the station buildings and goods shed are Grade II* listed as the Head of Steam museum. Nearby, the former carriage works are now used as workshops for steam locomotives. A little further east is Skerne Bridge, the oldest railway bridge in continuous use in the world. At Shildon is the Locomotion Museum, part of the National Railway Museum group, which contains heritage railway vehicles, including Locomotion No. 1. The site includes Timothy Hackworth's house, the Soho Workshop and a former coal drops, which are listed buildings. The heritage Weardale Railway runs special services over its line from Bishop Auckland to Eastgate-in-Weardale.

On 14 June 2007, during excavations for road building, some of the original stone sleepers used by the railway in 1825 were discovered intact near Lingfield Point. The stones each weigh about 75 pounds (34 kg) and have bolt holes for the chairs that secured the rail. Officials involved in the road project hope to preserve the stones along a new bicycle path.

=== Modern services ===
The current Tees Valley Line uses most of the former Stockton and Darlington Railway between Bishop Auckland and Saltburn. From Bishop Auckland the non-electrified line is single track to Shildon, double track to Heighington, and single track to the junction with the East Coast Main Line north of Darlington. This section is a Community Rail service called the Bishop line, and is sometimes known as the Heritage Line because of its links with the S&DR. South of Darlington, trains take the 1887 line before joining the original 1825 route to Stockton at the site of Oak Tree Junction. The line is 8 miles (13 km) to Eaglescliffe South Junction, where the 1853 Leeds Northern route is taken through Eaglescliffe station to Stockton Cut Junction. The non-electrified line then follows the S&DR route for 19 miles (31 km) to Saltburn, except for later deviations at Thornaby (1908) and Redcar (1978). The former Middlesbrough & Guisborough Railway line is open between Guisborough Junction and Nunthorpe as part of the Community Rail Esk Valley Line to Whitby.

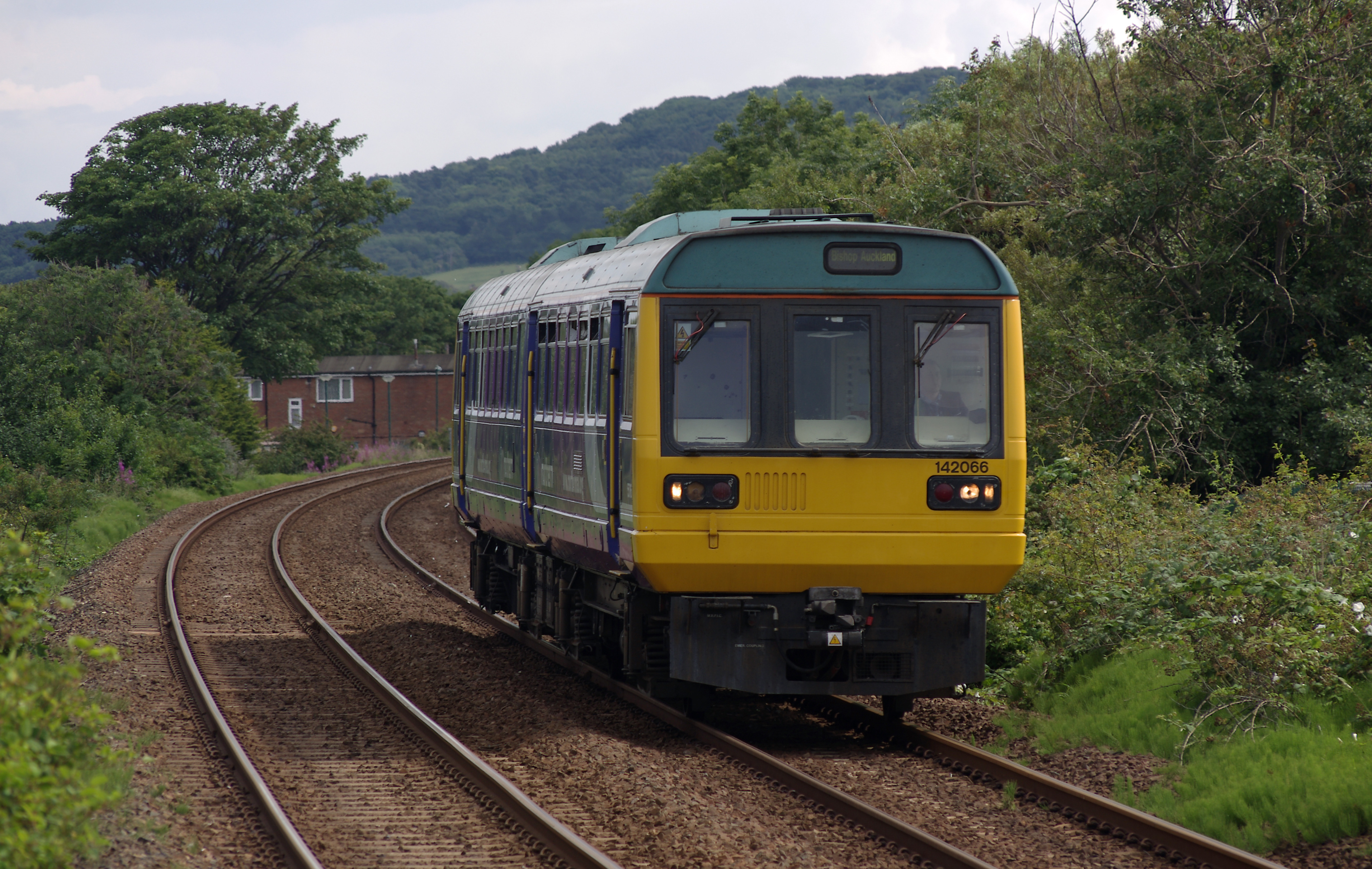
Northern Rail diesel multiple unit on the Tees Valley Line at Redcar East

As of July 2016 a two train per hour off-peak service is provided by Northern between Saltburn and Darlington, and ten trains a day continue to Bishop Auckland. One train per hour leaves Middlesbrough going south to Manchester Airport via Yarm and another travels north to Newcastle via Sunderland. There are eighteen trains a day between Middlesbrough and Nunthorpe, and four of these continue to Whitby. Tees Valley Unlimited, the local enterprise partnership, published in December 2013 its ambition to improve passenger services, with the priority of an all day two trains an hour service over the Darlington to Saltburn and Nunthorpe to Hartlepool routes using new trains; additional platforms are needed at Darlington station to allow this service frequency. A station serving James Cook University Hospital opened in May 2014. A Hitachi train plant opened in September 2015 at Newton Aycliffe to build trains for the Intercity Express Programme.

== Notes and references ==
=== Sources ===
- Allen, Cecil J. (1974) [1964]. The North Eastern Railway. Ian Allan. ISBN 0-7110-0495-1.
- Awdry, Christopher (1990). Encyclopaedia of British Railway Companies. Patrick Stephens. ISBN 1-85260-049-7.
- Cobb, Colonel M.H. (2006). The Railways of Great Britain: A Historical Atlas. Ian Allan. ISBN 978-0-7110-3236-1.
- Cook, C.W.F., ed. (September 1975). Cavalcade Reflections: Official British Rail Eastern Region Souvenir. British Rail. ISBN 0-7003-0029-5.
- Hedges, Martin, ed. (1981). 150 years of British Railways. Hamlyn. ISBN 0-600-37655-9.
- Hewison, Christian H. (1983). Locomotive Boiler Explosions. Newton Abbot: David & Charles. ISBN 0-7153-8305-1.
- Hoole, K. (1974a). A Regional History of the Railways of Great Britain: Volume IV The North East. David & Charles. ISBN 0-7153-6439-1.
- Hoole, K. (1974b). Stockton and Darlington Railway: Anniversary Celebrations of the World's first steam worked public railway. Dalesman. ISBN 0-85206-254-0.
- Kirby, Maurice W. (4 July 2002). The Origins of Railway Enterprise: The Stockton and Darlington Railway 1821–1863. Cambridge University Press. ISBN 978-0-521-89280-3.
- Lee, Charles Edward (1946). Passenger Class Distinctions. Railway Gazette. OCLC 12040938.
- Rolt, L.T.C. (1984). George and Robert Stephenson: The Railway Revolution. Penguin. ISBN 0-14-007646-8.
- Smiles, Samuel (1904). Lives of the Engineers. The Locomotive. George and Robert Stephenson. John Murray. OCLC 220796785.
- Thomson, Thomas, ed. (March 1819). "Durham Coal Field". Annals of Philosophy. Vol. XIII. London: Baldwin, Cradock and Joy. p. 223.
- Tomlinson, William Weaver (1915). The North Eastern Railway: Its rise and development. Andrew Reid and Company. OCLC 504251788.
- Walton, Peter (1992). The Stainmore and Eden Valley Railways. Oxford Publishing. ISBN 0-86093-306-7.
- Whishaw, Francis (1842). The Railways of Great Britain and Ireland Practically Described and Illustrated (2nd ed.). London: John Weale. OCLC 833076248.
- Route Specifications – London North Eastern. Network Rail. 2012.
- Tees Valley Unlimited Progress Report December 2013 (PDF). Tees Valley Unlimited. Archived from the original (PDF) on 4 October 2015.
