= John Dobbin =

English painter

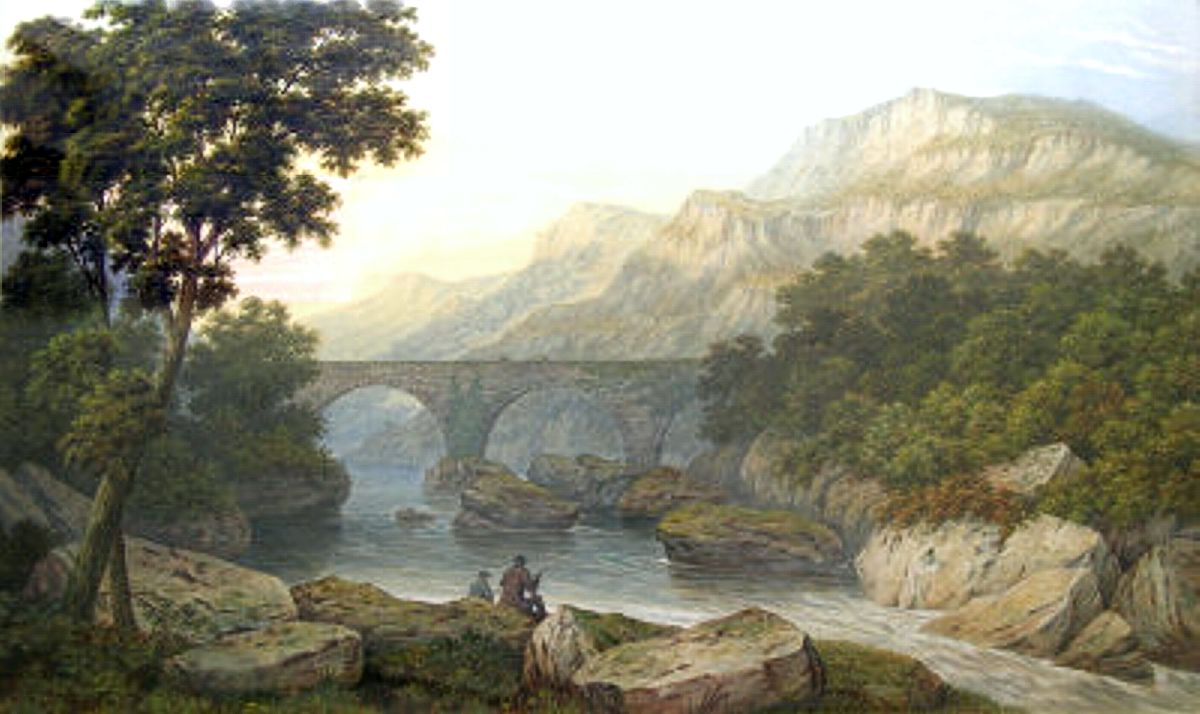
'Anglers in a mountainous river landscape' (1881)

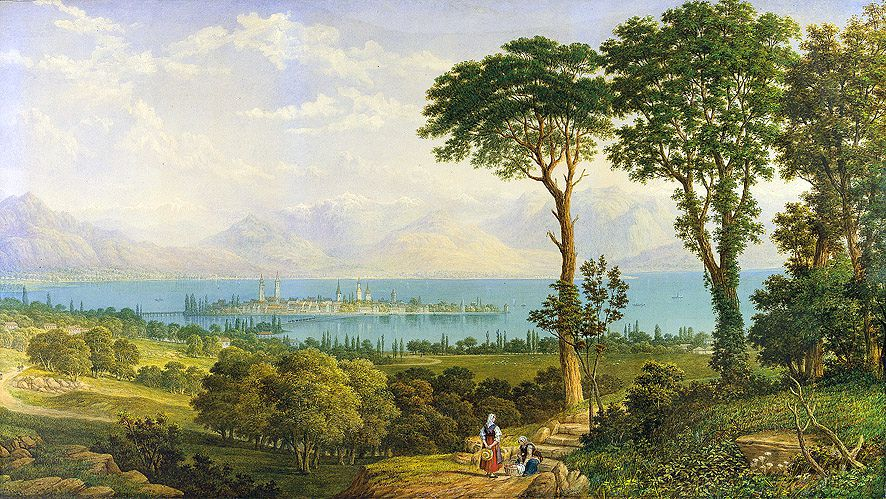
'View of Hoyerberg above the island of Lindau' (1883)

John Dobbin (baptised 21 March 1815 St Cuthbert's, Darlington - 1888 London) was an English landscape painter, the son of John and Elizabeth who lived in Weaver's Yard. John, the son, did not follow the same trade as his father, who was a weaver working in Pease's Mill in Darlington town centre, but was apprenticed instead to a cabinet-maker in Grange Road. He was not happy with this choice of career and in his twenties left for London to become an artist.

Dobbin later travelled extensively in Scotland, France, Spain, Germany and the Netherlands. He exhibited at the Royal Academy between 1842 and 1875.

Dobbin's best-known work is the Opening of the Stockton to Darlington Railway, showing Ignatius Bonomi's Skerne Bridge, portrayed until 2003 on the reverse of Series E £5 notes issued by the Bank of England, where George Stephenson's portrait is shown along with the Rocket steam locomotive. John was 10 years old at the time, and possibly attended the historic opening, but it was only 50 years later that the picture was painted, so that it was done either from memory or from a sketch by his father.

Dobbin frequently returned to his home town, and Darlington features in many of his works. His paintings became more spiritual after the death of his first wife, Amy. His second wife, Hannah Jones, came from an affluent family and probably paid for his Grand Tour of Europe. Dobbin was fairly renowned in his day and enjoyed an audience with Isabella II of Spain, who gave him free rein to paint what he pleased in her country.

Dobbin created a reredos for St Cuthbert's Church. In a move that may have been inspired by his Italian trip, he turned to mosaic and worked for some six years cutting tiles for his version of The Last Supper. His Apostles were described by a clergyman as "the most villainous set of mortals I have ever seen".
