= Skerne Bridge =

Railway bridge in Darlington, County Durham, UK; in continuous use since 1825

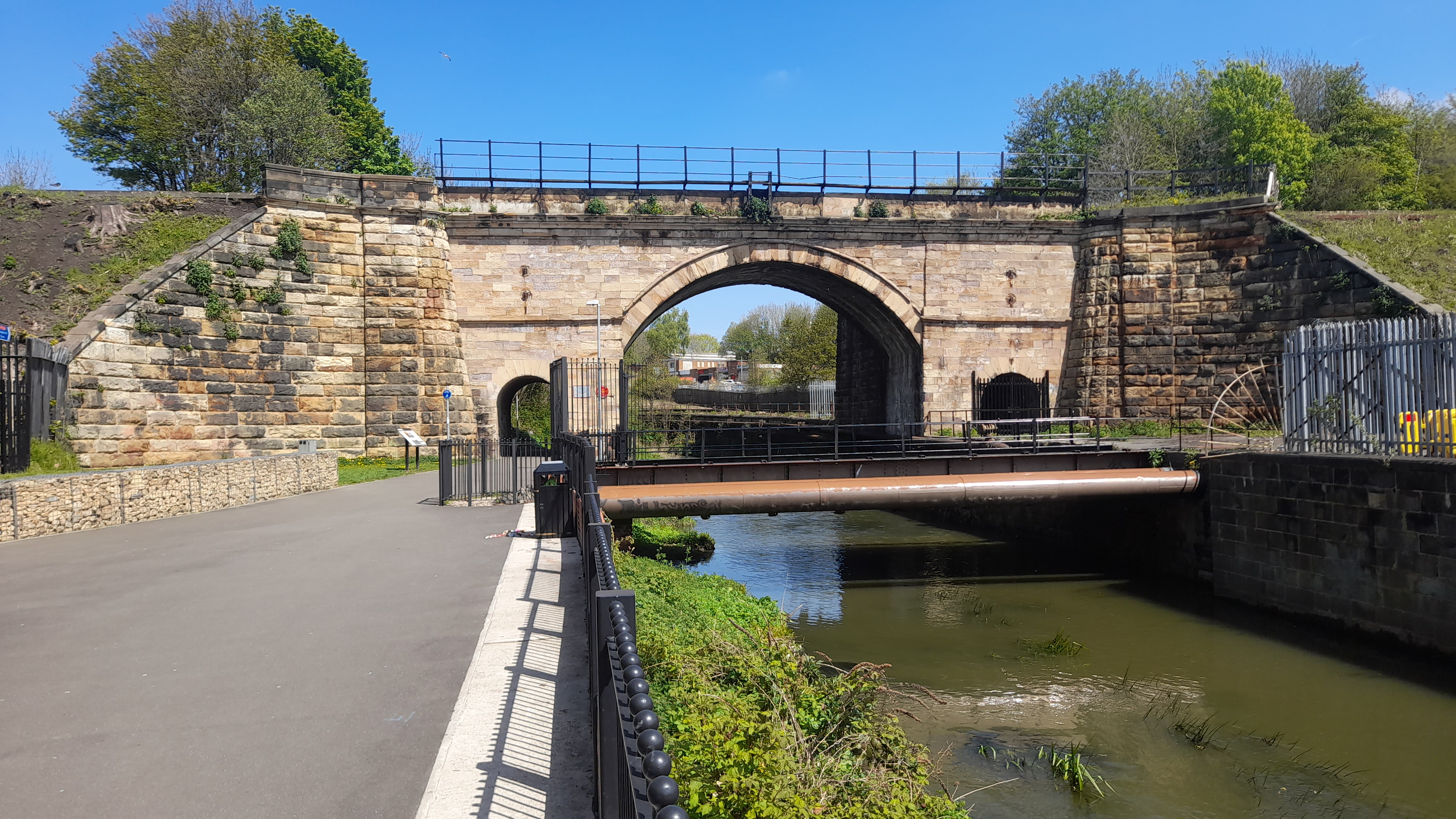
- South side, with original arches flanked by later buttresses
- Coordinates: 54°32′4.0″N 1°33′2.2″W
- OS grid reference: NZ 29177 15558
- Carries: Tees Valley Line
- Crosses: River Skerne
- Locale: Darlington
- Owner: Network Rail

Characteristics
- Design: Arch
- Material: Stone
- Longest span: 39 ft 6 in (12.04 m)
- No. of spans: 3

History
- Designer: Ignatius Bonomi
- Constructed by: Francis Peacock, of Yarm
- Opened: 27 September 1825

Statistics

Listed Building – Grade I
- Official name: Skerne Bridge
- Designated: 7 December 2021
- Reference no.: 1475481

The Skerne Bridge is a railway bridge over the River Skerne in Darlington, County Durham. Built in 1825 for the Stockton and Darlington Railway, it carried the first train on the opening day, 27 September 1825. It is still in use, being the oldest railway bridge in continuous use in the world. It is a Grade I listed building.

== History ==
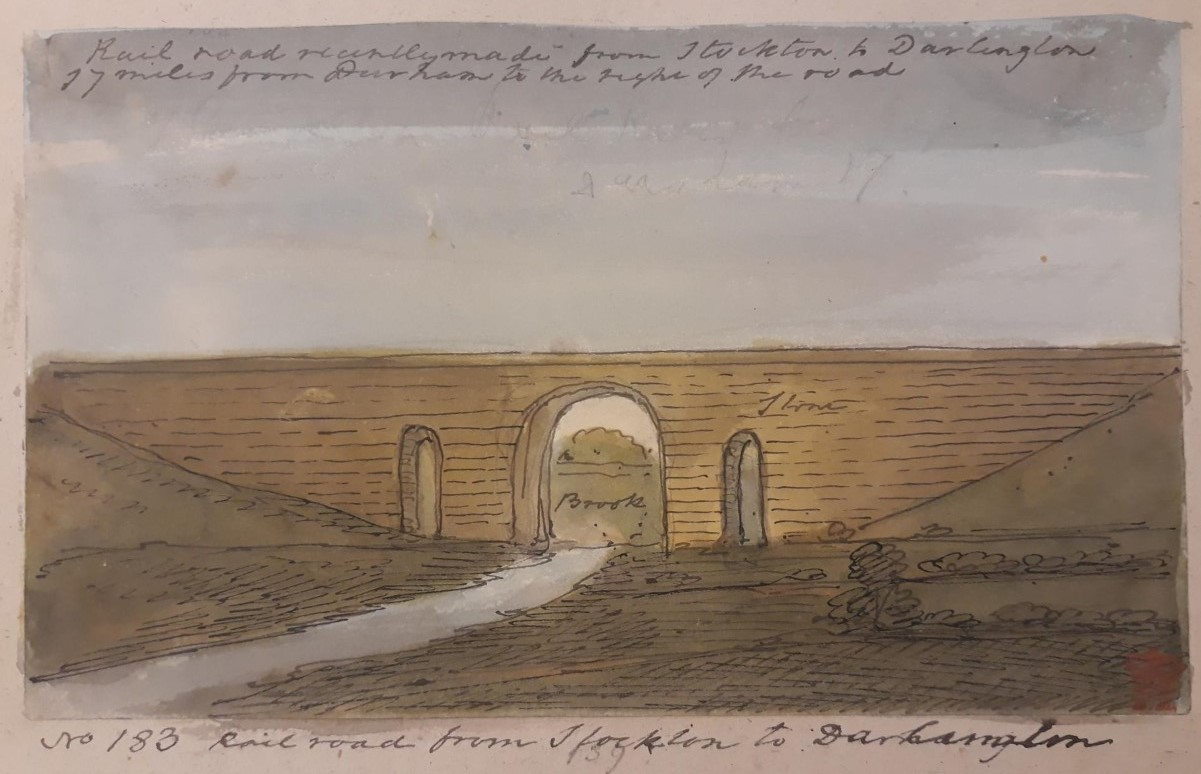
Bridge in August 1825, as originally built

The Stockton and Darlington Railway had to cross the Skerne River, and it was originally intended that George Stephenson should erect a stone and iron bridge. However, when the similar Gaunless Bridge he had designed had to be rebuilt after suffering flood damage, the railway directors told him to consult Ignatius Bonomi. Bonomi designed a stone arch bridge, with a single arch spanning the river and two smaller flood arches over the paths either side. It was built by Francis Peacock of Yarm. The bridge famously featured on the opening day of the railway, 27 September 1825, when Locomotion No. 1 crossed it with a train of coal and passengers. Shortly before the opening, in August 1825, the Revd John Skinner sketched the bridge as it was originally built. The pride taken in the bridge is suggested by its appearance on the railway's share certificates.

Traffic over the bridge increased far beyond the S&DR's expectations, and by 1828 the embankments leading to the bridge were showing serious damage. In 1829 the railway engaged John Falcus Carter of Heighington to repair it. He added curved flanking walls, holding back earth ramparts, that shored up Bonomi's failing embankments. The railway survived and prospered. To celebrate their fiftieth year in 1875, they commissioned John Dobbin to paint the original opening day. He, assuming that little about the bridge had changed, portrayed it as it appeared in 1875–complete with curved retaining walls–in his reconstruction of the 1825 opening scene. A similar error occurs in Robert Thurston's A history of the growth of the steam engine.

At a later date, Carter's flank walls were hidden by additional heavier walls of rustic stone that do not match the original bridge. At some point before 1897, the bridge was widened on the north side to carry four tracks. The widened trackbed has since been removed, since 1967, leaving only the stone piers, and a single track still using the original arches. (Note: An 1897 map shows the wider bridge, as does a 1967 photograph.)

== Renovation and commemoration ==
On 19 June 1970 the bridge was listed as scheduled monument number 1002331. Ahead of the 195th anniversary of the Stockton and Darlington railway in 2020, Network Rail (who own the railway infrastructure) cleaned the stonework, removing plant growth and cutting back the surrounding greenery to make the bridge more visible. A public information board explains the history of the bridge. The bridge (in its post-1829 form) has also featured on reverse of the Bank of England £5 notes issued between 1990 and 2002. The ICE's Panel for Historical Engineering Works has listed it as HEW 151. The National Transport Trust has marked it with a Red Wheel plaque. Having carried the railway over the River Skerne since 1825, under the Stockton and Darlington, North Eastern, and London and North Eastern railways, and British Rail, Railtrack and (currently) Network Rail, the Skerne Bridge is the oldest railway bridge in continuous use in the world.

On 7 December 2021, Historic England gave it a new designation as a Grade I listed building, in recognition of its architectural and historic interest.

The bridge is a short distance from Hopetown Darlington, which occupies the former station building of North Road railway station. Until March 2021, this museum (then called 'Head of Steam') housed Locomotion No. 1, the locomotive that pulled the inaugural train over Skerne Bridge. The locomotive has been moved to the eponymously named Locomotion in preparation for the bicentenary celebrations of the S&DR in 2025.

== Gallery ==
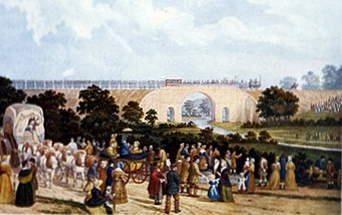
Opening of Stockton and Darlington Railway in 1825 (excerpt) by John Dobbin (painted 1875).

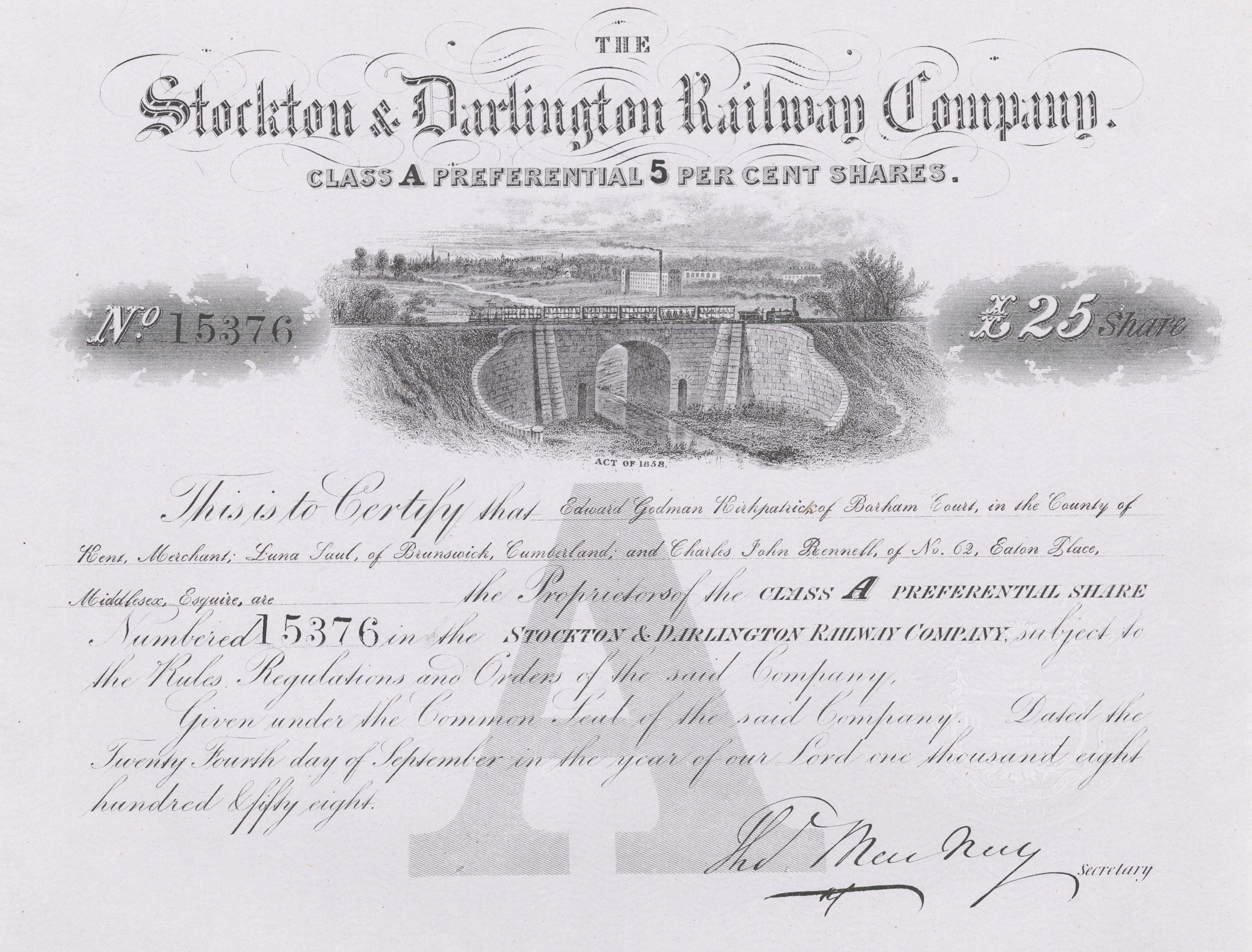
Preferential Share of the Stockton and Darlington Railway, issued 24. September 1858

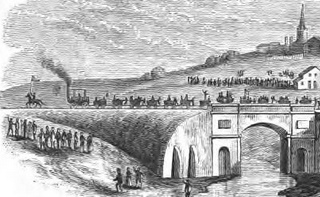
The post-1829 Skerne Bridge used in an image of the 1825 opening in Robert Thurston's book.

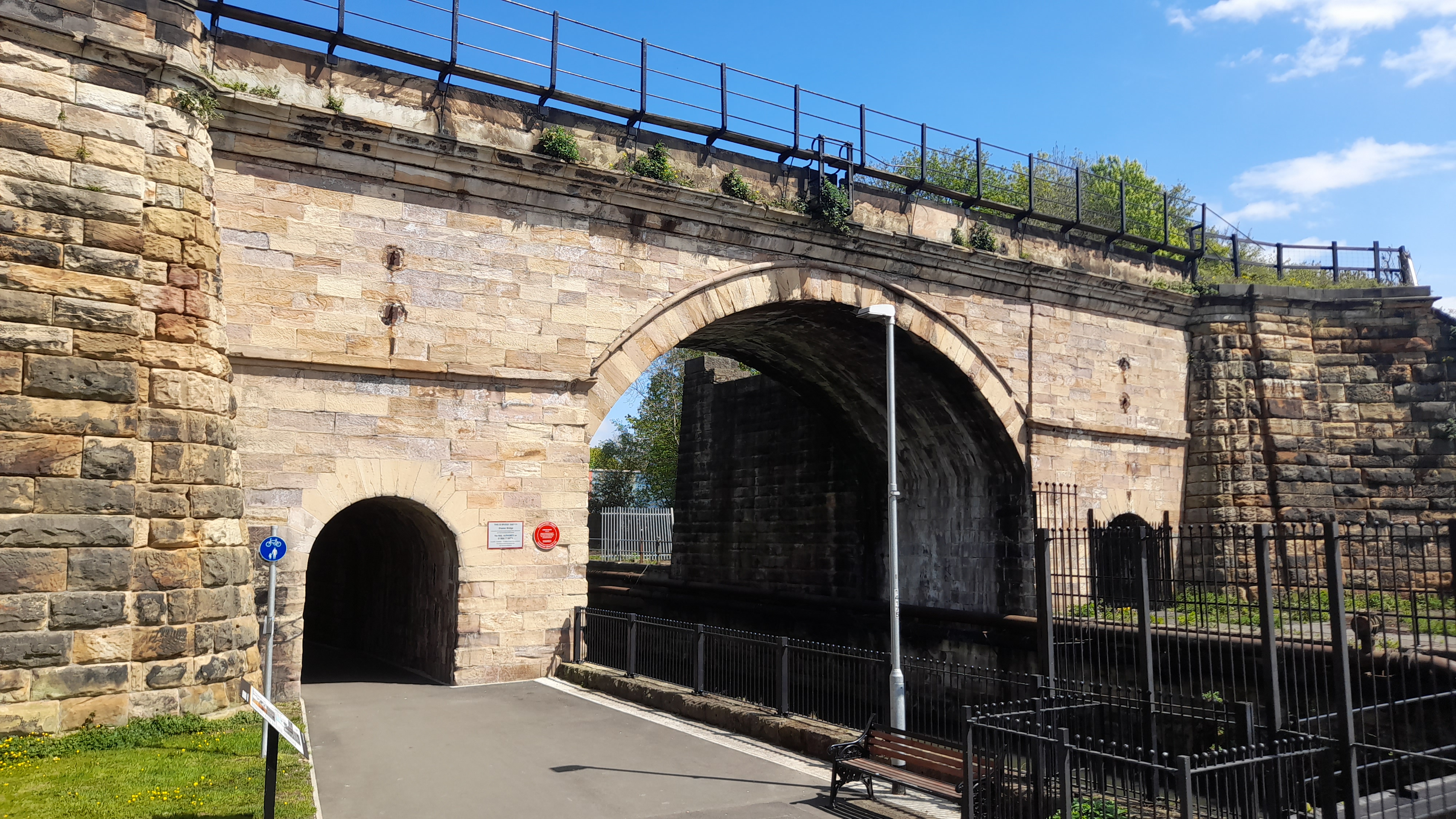
The flat stonework of the original arches contrasts with the rustic stone of the later flanking walls. A public information board is in the foreground.

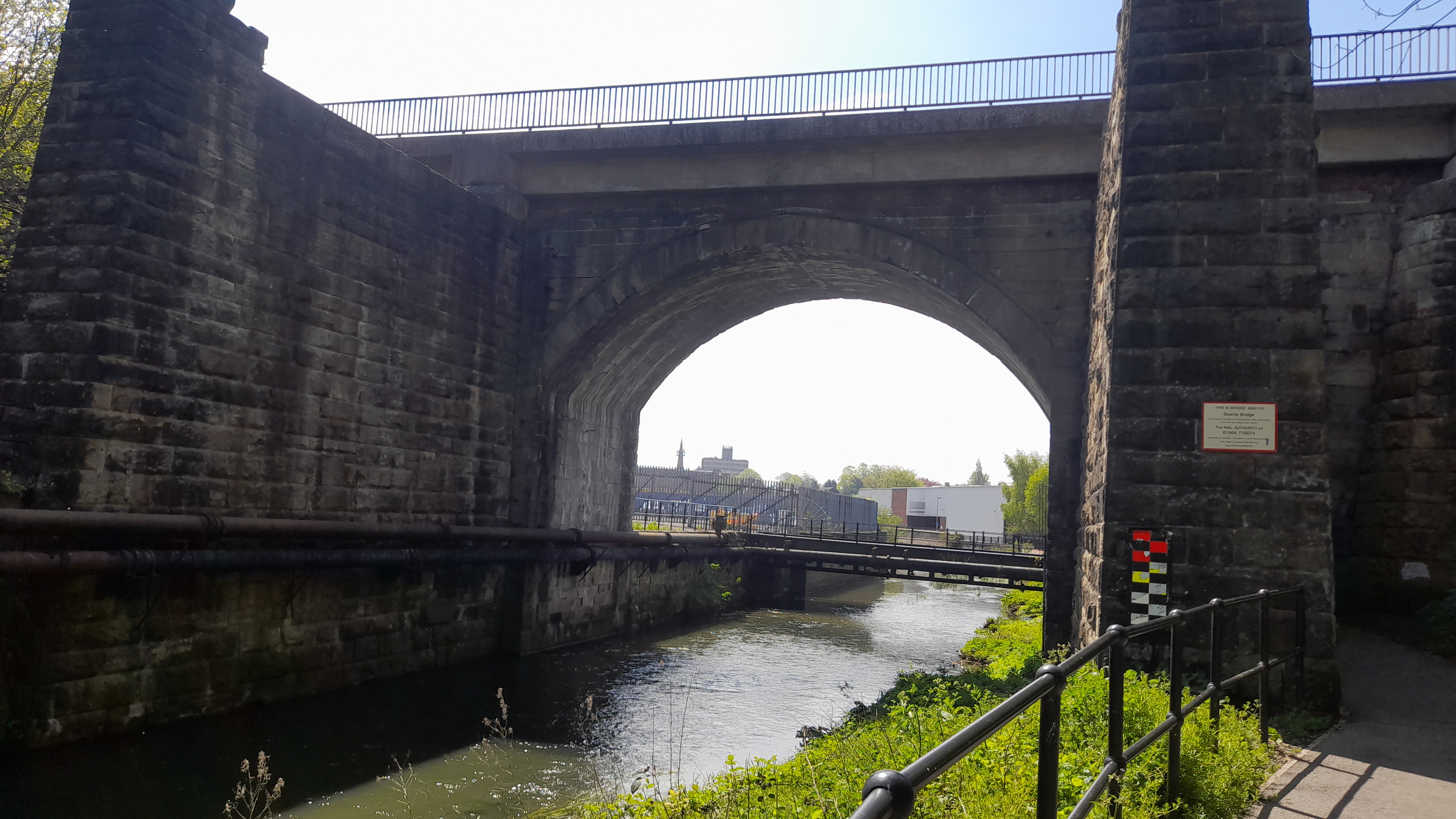
The piers are left from the widening of the bridge on the north side.

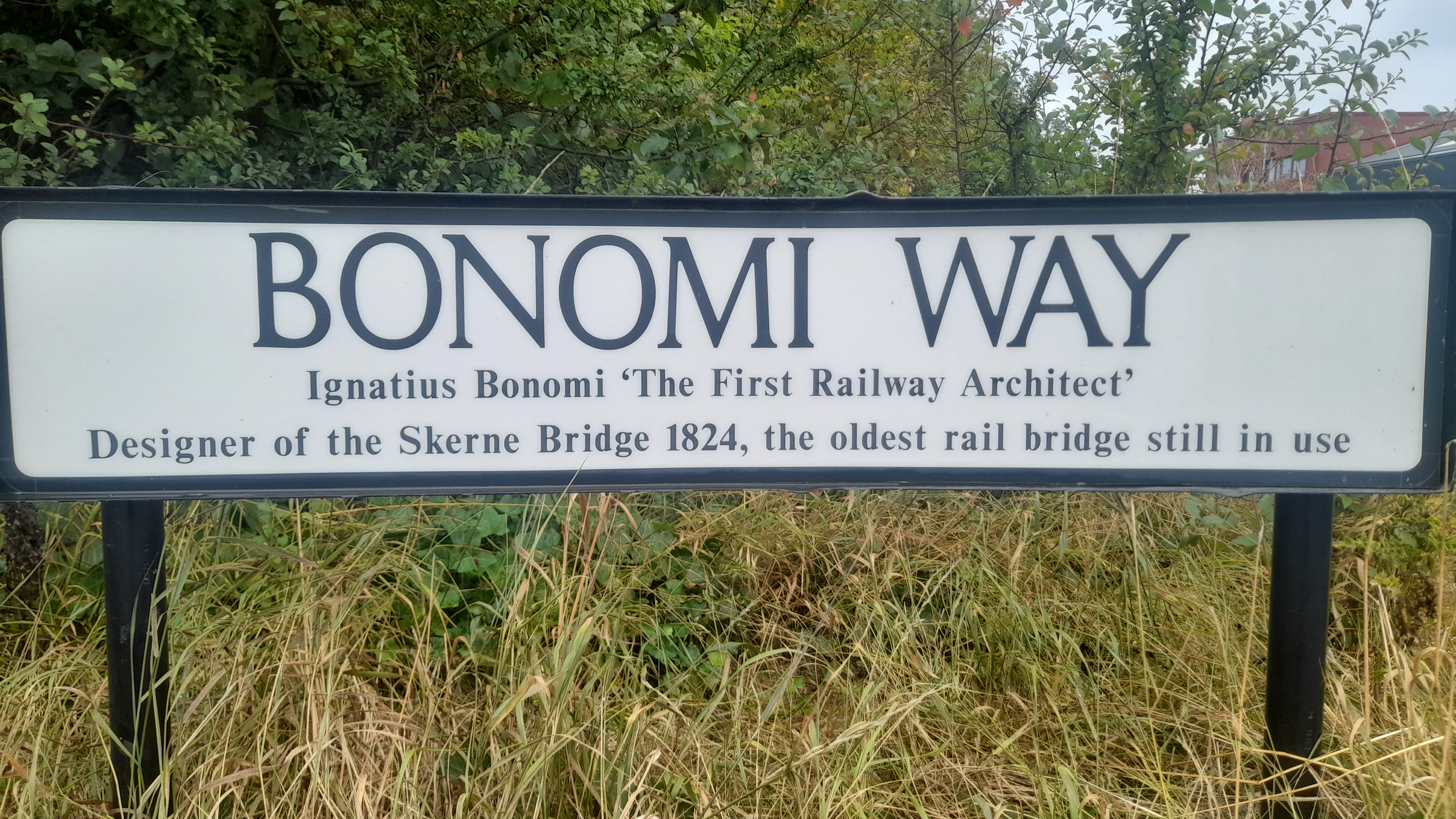
Darlington street name commemorating Bonomi as architect of the Skerne Bridge
