= Ignatius Bonomi =

English architect and surveyor

- Born: 31 October 1787
- Died: 2 January 1870 (aged 82)
- Occupations: Architect, surveyor
- Parent: Joseph Bonomi the Elder
- Relatives: Joseph Bonomi the Younger (brother)
- Buildings: Skerne Bridge

Ignatius Bonomi (1787–1870) was an English architect and surveyor, with Italian origins by his father, strongly associated with Durham in north-east England.

== Life ==
He was the son of an architect and draughtsman, Joseph Bonomi (1739–1808), who had worked with Robert and James Adam, while his brother Joseph Bonomi the Younger was a noted artist, sculptor and Egyptologist.

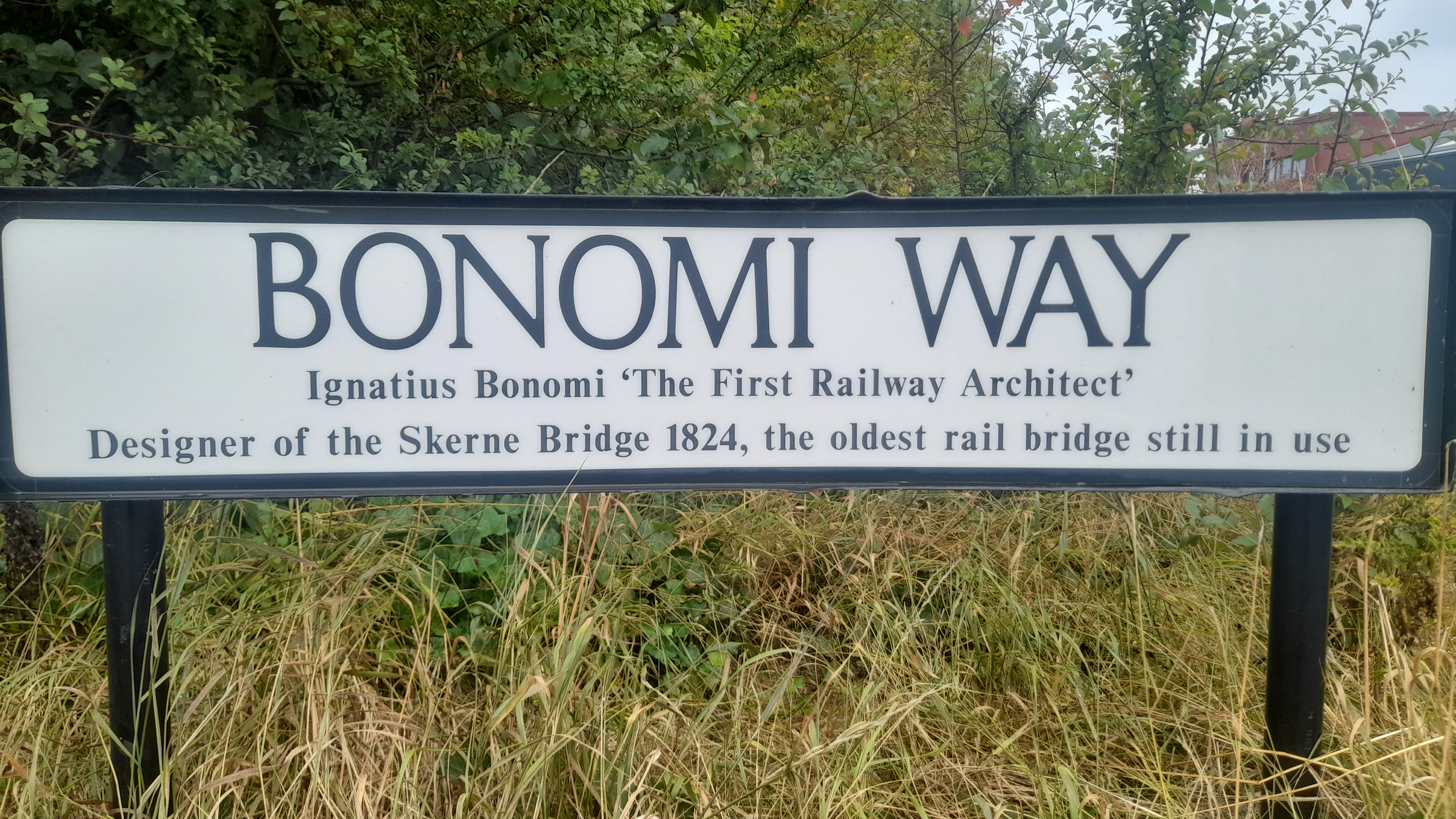
Darlington street commemorating Bonomi as architect of the Skerne Bridge

Bonomi was Surveyor of Bridges for the County of Durham, and his works included the Skerne Bridge; one of the first railway bridges in Britain, over the River Skerne, near Darlington, for the Stockton and Darlington Railway, in 1824 (hence he is sometimes referred to as 'the first railway architect').

He was also responsible for a number of church buildings (including commissions at Durham Cathedral). Other historic buildings, in Gothic and neo-classical styles, included Durham Castle, Lambton Castle (continuing the work started by his father), Durham Prison, Elvet Hill House (1820), Burn Hall, Windlestone Hall and Eggleston Hall, all in County Durham. In Derbyshire he designed Christ Church King Sterndale near Buxton, built in 1848–9 for the Pickford family, founders of the Pickfords removals business.

In 1817 Bonomi was contracted to design a mansion, Normanby Hall, in Normanby.

Other works included the remodelling of Crossbeck House (Normanby) (1824) the design of Marton House near Appleby-in-Westmorland, Cumbria (1822), Blagdon Hall (1830) in Stannington near Morpeth, St Mary's Church, Sunderland (1830), rebuilding St Oswald's Church, Durham (1834), the church of St John the Baptist in Leeming, North Yorkshire (1839) and the restoration of St Nicholas, Richmond in North Yorkshire. For his brother Joseph, he also designed a house, "The Camels", at Wimbledon in south-west London. He also designed houses at Masterman Place in Middleton-in-Teesdale.

In 1831, Bonomi took on John Loughborough Pearson as an apprentice. In 1842 he entered into a partnership with John Augustus Cory, later Cumberland County Architect (from 1862). The church of St John the Evangelist, Nenthead (1845, the highest church in England) was one of their joint projects.

Until 1850 he lived in his modest stone villa in Durham City, now the Oriental Museum.
