= List of closed railway lines in the United Kingdom =

This list is for railway lines across Great Britain and Northern Ireland, which are now long abandoned, closed, dismantled, disused or mothballed.

Across the United Kingdom, examples exist of opened railways which formerly constituted cross-country main trunk lines as well as many more which served more local, or exclusively industrial, needs.

Some of the included lines have re-opened, whether in part or in full, following a period of closure, such reopenings have taken the form of independent preserved heritage railways, and of expansions to state-backed National Rail and local rapid transit and light rail networks.

Many more of these former railway lines have also been converted to cycleways, footpaths and highways.

== England ==
Name of line	Builder(s)	Route (from/to)	Closure date	Notes
Abbotsbury Railway		Abbotsbury to Upwey	29 November 1952	
Addiscombe Line	SER	Elmers End to Addiscombe	2 June 1997	Partly open as part of Tramlink
Alcester–Hatton branch line	Great Western Railway	Alcester to Hatton, via Great Alne	1947 (to passengers); 1951 (to all traffic)	
Aldeburgh branch line	Great Eastern Railway (LNER)	Saxmundham to Aldeburgh via Leiston and Thorpeness	12 September 1966	Part of the branch still open (freight only)
Aldridge–Brownhills branch line	Midland Railway (LMS)	Aldridge to Chasewater, via Brownhills	1930 (to passengers); 1962 (to all traffic)	Part of the line (north of Brownhills) now preserved as the Chasewater Railway.
Allhallows-on-Sea to Stoke Junction	SR	Stoke Junction to Allhallows	4 December 1961	Southern branch off the Hoo branch line (off the North Kent Line) (opened 14 May 1932)
Alnmouth–Alnwick branch line	York, Newcastle and Berwick Railway YN&BR (LNER)	Alnmouth to Alnwick	29 January 1968 (to all traffic)	Most of the former branch now being restored from a resited Alnwick terminus, as the Aln Valley Railway.
Ambergate–Pye Bridge line	Midland Railway (LMS)	Pye Bridge to Ambergate, (via Butterley)	1968	A 3 1/2 Mile stretch of the line, now preserved forming the Midland Railway – Butterley.
Amble branch line	YN&BR	Chevington to Amble	1930 (to passengers); 1969 (to all traffic)	
Amesbury and Military Camp Light Railway	LSWR	Grately to Bulford Camp	1963	
Ardsley to Laisterdyke line	Great Northern Railway (LNER)	Laisterdyke to Ardsley, via Dudley Hill and Morley	3 July 1966 (to passengers); 13 March 1968 (to freight); 1981 (to all traffic)	Opened by the Leeds, Bradford & Halifax Joint Rly before taken over by the GNR in 1865
Ashbourne line	London & North Western Railway (LMS)	Uttoxeter and Ashbourne to Buxton line	30 October 1954 (to regular passenger traffic); October 1967 (to freight traffic).	Most of the line now survives as a walk/cycle path called the Tissington Trail
Ashover Light Railway	Clay Cross Company	Clay Cross to Ashover	14 September 1936 (to passengers); 31 March 1950 (to all traffic)	
Axholme Joint Railway		Goole to Haxey	15 July 1933 (to passengers); 5 April 1965 (to all traffic)	
Axminster-Lyme Regis branch line	London and South Western Railway (Southern Railway)	Axminster to Lyme Regis via Combpyne	29 November 1965 (to all traffic)	
Bacup branch line	Lancashire & Yorkshire Railway (LMS)	Stubbins Junction to Bacup, via Rawtenstall, Clough Fold and Stacksteads	1966 (to regular traffic); 1972 (to all traffic)	Part of the former branch (through Stubbins Junction to Rawtenstall, via Irwell Vale), now part of the East Lancashire Railway.
Banbury and Cheltenham Direct Railway	Great Western Railway	Cheltenham to Banbury		
Banbury branch	Great Central Railway	Banbury to Culworth Junction		
Banbury to Verney Junction branch line	Buckinghamshire Railway (GWR)	Banbury to Verney Junction (Where it joined the Varsity Line)	January 1961	Freight services lasted until June 1966
Bank Top Colliery Line	North Staffordshire Railway (LMS)	Blythe Bridge to Bank Top	1965	Portion of the line, now preserved as the Foxfield Railway. Mostly a colliery line, throughout its heyday.
Barnard Castle to Middleton-in-Teesdale branch line	Tees Valley Railway (LNER)	Barnard Castle to Middleton-in-Teesdale	30 November 1964 (to passengers); 5 April 1965 (to all traffic)	
Barnsley Coal Railway		Stairfoot Junction to Nostell	1930 (to passengers); 1961 (to all traffic)	
Basingstoke and Alton Light Railway	London and South Western Railway (SR)	Basingstoke to Alton	1932 (to passengers); 19?? (to freight)	
Batley-Beeston Line	Great Northern Railway (LNER)	Beeston Junction to Batley, via Tingley and Woodkirk	1939 (to passengers); 1964 (to all traffic)	Some parts of the Line still exist... Tingley Viaduct (still stands), as do both Tingley and Woodkirk station sites (both of whom long overgrown), and Soothill Tunnel. Tingley railway station was also a Junction station on both the loop line, and the Ardsley to Laisterdyke line.
Bawtry to Haxey railway line	GNR	Bawtry to Haxey	1 April 1965	
Bedale branch	YN&BR	Northallerton to Bedale	1954 (to passengers)	Line remains extant as part of the Wensleydale Railway
Bedford–Hitchin line	Midland Railway	Bedford to Hitchin	30 Dec 1961 (to passengers); 1964 (to freight)	
Bedford–Northampton line	Midland Railway (LMS)	Bedford to Northampton	1962 (to passengers); 1981 (to all traffic)	
Benwick Goods Railway	Great Eastern Railway (LNER)		1966 (to all traffic)	
Bexhill West branch line	SER	Crowhurst to Bexhill West	15 June 1964	
Billingham-on-Tees to Port Clarence branch line	Clarence Railway/ NER (LNER)	Billingham-on-Tees to Port Clarence/Seal Sands Power Station, via Belasis Lane and Haverton Hill	11 September 1939 (to passengers, east of Haverton Hill); 14 June 1954 (to regular passengers, west of Haverton Hill); 6 November 1961 (to all passengers); 2 November 1964 (to goods)	The line remains open to freight traffic from the chemical and biochemical processing plant cluster around Haverton Hill and Seal Sands
Birkenhead Dock Branch	LMS	Rock Ferry to Bidston Dock, via Mollington Street and Canning Street	16 February 1985 (to passenger traffic); 1987 (to regular goods); 2008 (to all traffic)	Entire branch line still extant, but disused
Birkenhead Railway		Hooton to West Kirby	17 September 1956 (to passengers); May 1962 (to all traffic)	
Birmingham Snow Hill to Wolverhampton Low Level Line	GWR	Birmingham to Wolverhampton	1972 (to passengers); August 1992 (to all traffic)	Part of the line reopened as part of the Jewellery Line. Whilst another part of the line reopened as part of the West Midlands Metro
Bishops Castle Railway		Craven Arms to Bishops Castle	1935	
Bishop's Stortford–Braintree branch line		Bishop's Stortford to Braintree	3 March 1952 (to passengers); 17 February 1972 (to all traffic)	
Blenheim and Woodstock branch line	Private (absorbed by GWR)	Kidlington to Woodstock	March 1954	
Blyth and Tyne Railway	B&TR/NER (LNER)	A former network of primarily colliery lines in south east Northumberland and North Tyneside	2 November 1964 (to passengers, north of Backworth and Monkseaton); 1971-1983 (in stages, to all traffic on North Tyneside Loop)	Some of the former B&TR constituted part of the North Tyneside Loop which was officially incorporated into the Tyne and Wear Metro on 11 August 1980. Much of the northern section of the network remains open for freight traffic serving the Port of Blyth and Lynemouth Power Station; as of July 2020, there is an active project seeking to reintroduce a Newcastle to Ashington passenger service using much of this surviving freight network. A section of B&TR's original main line was reopened during the 1970s as a test track for the Tyne and Wear Metro rolling stock and is now largely preserved (between Percy Main and Middle Engine Lane) as the North Tyneside Steam Railway.
Bolton and Leigh Railway		Kenyon Junction to Bolton	29 March 1954 (to passengers); 1969 (to all traffic)	
Border Counties Railway		Riccarton Junction to Hexham	15 October 1956 (to passengers); 1 September 1958 (to all traffic)	
Bordon Light Railway		Bentley to Bordon	16 September 1957 (to passengers); 4 April 1966 (to all traffic)	
Brampton Railway			28 March 1953 (to all traffic)	
Brentford branch line	Great Western Railway	Southall to Brentford Dock	4 May 1942 (to passengers); December 1970 (to regular freight)	Part of the Line still extant
Bricklayers Arms branch	London and Croydon Railway/ SER	Bricklayers Arms to Brighton/South Eastern Main Lines	1 January 1852 (to passengers); 1981 (to goods)	
Brightlingsea branch line	Tendring Hundred Railway	Wivenhoe to Brightlingsea		
Brill Tramway		Brill to Quainton Road	30 November 1935	
Bristol and Gloucester Railway		Bristol to Gloucester via Yate	29 December 1969	Section between Yate and Gloucester remains open
Bristol and North Somerset Railway	Great Western Railway	Frome to Bristol	1958-9 (to passengers); 1963 (to all traffic)	
Bristol and South Wales Union Railway		Bristol to Portskewett	23 November 1964	
Bristol Port Railway and Pier		Hotwells to Avonmouth	1922 (Hotwells branch)	Portions of the line remain in use as part of the Severn Beach line
Bodmin and Wadebridge Railway	GWR/ LSWR (Southern Railway)	Bodmin Road to Wadebridge (via Bodmin General, Boscarne Junction and Grogley)	1967 (to passengers); 197? (to freight); 1983 (to all traffic)	6 1/2-mile stretch of the line now preserved as the Bodmin & Wenford Railway.
Botley to Bishops Waltham branch line	LSWR	Botley to Bishops Waltham	1962	
Bourn and Essendine Railway	GNR	Bourne to Essendine	18 June 1951	
Bourne and Sleaford Railway	GNR	Bourne to Sleaford	22 September 1930 (to passengers); 2 April 1965 (all traffic)	
Bridport Railway	GWR	Maiden Newton to Bridport	22 September 1930 (to passengers); 1965 (to all traffic)	
Buckinghamshire Junction Railway			8 Nov 1965	
	South Eastern Railway (SR)	Rochester Bridge Junction to Chatham Central	1 Oct 1911	SER branch from North Kent Line to rival LCDR's Chatham Main Line – closed with advent of SECR circa 1890s
Bumble Hole line	GWR	Old Hill to Blowers Green	1964 (to passengers); January 1968 (to all traffic)	
Buntingford branch line	GER	St Margarets to Buntingford	14 November 1964 (to passengers); 17 September 1965 (to goods)	
Cambridge and St Ives branch line		Cambridge to St Ives	5 October 1970 (to passengers); May 1992 (to all traffic)	Forms part of the Cambridgeshire Guided Busway
Cambridge to Mildenhall line	GER	Cambridge to Mildenhall	1965	
Camerton branch line	Great Western Railway	Limpley Stoke to Hallatrow	21 September 1925 (to passengers); 15 February 1951 (to all traffic)	
Canterbury and Whitstable Railway (SR)		Whitstable Harbour to Canterbury North Lane	1952-1953	known as the "Crab and Winkle Line" – 1830–1952
Cargo Fleet to Eston branch line	Cleveland Railway/ NER (LNER)	Cargo Fleet to Eston	11 March 1929 (to passengers); 3 October 1966 (to all traffic)	The line followed the northern section of the earlier Cleveland Railway mineral line which had originally continued south to Guisborough and Brotton via a number of inclines but this section was dismantled in 1873. The line paralleled an earlier branch which ran to the east of the settlement of Eston (known as the Eston Mines branch) and which carried an intermittent passenger service during the 19th Century.
Carlisle and Silloth Bay Railway		Carlisle to Silloth	1932 (to passengers); 1964 (to all traffic)	
Castleford–Garforth line	NER	Castleford to Garforth	January 1951 (to passengers); 6 June 1998 (to all traffic)	
Castle Donington Line	Midland Railway		21 September 1930 (to passengers)	Regular passenger service withdrawn and stations closed in 1930. Line remains open to freight and is occasionally used for diverted passenger services
Castle Eden Railway	North Eastern Railway (LNER)	Thornaby to Wellfield, via Thorpe Thewles	2 November 1931 (to passengers); 2 April 1951 (to goods); 1968 (to all traffic)	Stopping passenger services only ever ran over the line north of Redmarshall Junction, south of which they used the Stillington line to reach Stockton. The southern section of the line was electrified as part of the NER's 1914 Shildon to Newport electrification project but was subsequently de-electrified by the LNER in 1935. Most of the route reused as the Castle Eden Walkway.
Cawood, Wistow and Selby Light Railway		Cawood to Selby	1 January 1930 (to passengers); 23 May 1960 (to all traffic)	
Castleton to Bolton Line	Lancashire & Yorkshire Rly	Bolton to Castleton, via Darcy lever, Bradley Fold and Broadfield	5 October 1970 (to all traffic)	Four mile stretch of track (between Bury and Heywood) now part of the East Lancashire Railway.
Maryport and Carlisle Railway (Bolton/Mealsgate Loop)	LMS	Maryport to Carlisle, via Baggrow and High Blaithwaite	1930 (to passengers); 1952 (to all traffic)	
Chard branch line	Bristol & Exeter Rly/LSWR (Joint)	Chard Junction to Taunton, via Donyatt, Hatch and Thornfalcon	10 September 1962 (to passengers); 6 July 1964 (to goods); 3 October 1966 (to all traffic)	
Charnwood Forest Railway		Coalville to Loughborough	13 April 1931 (to passengers); 12 December 1963 (to all traffic)	
Cheadle branch line		Cresswell to Cheadle	17 June 1963 (to passengers); 1989 (to all traffic)	
Cheddar Valley line	Great Western Rly	Witham Friary to Yatton, via Cranmore, Shepton Mallet, Wells, Lodge Hill and Congresbury	1963 (to passengers); 1971 (to goods); 1985 (to all traffic)	A 2 1/2-mile stretch of the line now preserved as the East Somerset Railway.
Cheddington to Aylesbury Line		Cheddington to Aylesbury	2 February 1953 (to passengers); 2 December 1963 (to all traffic)	
Chester and Birkenhead Railway	C&BR/ Birkenhead Railway (London & North Western Railway and Great Western Railway Joint Line) (LMS/GWR)	Chester to Birkenhead Grange Lane/Monks Ferry/Woodside, via Mollington, Capenhurst, Ledsham, Hooton, Spital, Bebington, Rock Ferry and Birkenhead Town	5 November 1967 (to all traffic, north of Rock Ferry)	Originally terminated at Birkenhead Grange Lane in 1840–1844, before being diverted to new termini at Monks Ferry (until 1878) and Woodside (until 1967). Constituted the most northerly section of the GWR London Paddington to Birkenhead (for Liverpool) main line. Line remains open south of Rock Ferry as part of the Chester branch of Merseyrail's Wirral line.
Chester and Connah's Quay Railway		Chester to Shotton	1968 (to passengers); 1992 (to all traffic)	
Chester Northgate to Hawarden Bridge line	MSLR (LNER)	Chester Northgate to Hawarden Bridge via Blacon and Saughall	9 September 1968 (to passengers); 199? (to all traffic)	The line was closed to all traffic during 20 April 1984 to 31 August 1986 but reopened again for goods until the early 1990s.
Chevington to Amble branch line	YN&BR (LNER)	Chevington to Amble	7 July 1930 (to passengers); 14 December 1964 (to goods); 6 October 1969 (to all traffic)	Though the branch opened for mineral traffic to Warkworth Harbour (Amble) in 1849, passenger services were not introduced until 1879.
Chippenham and Calne line	Great Western Railway	Chippenham to Calne	1965	
Churnet Valley line	North Staffordshire Railway (LMS)	North Rode (via Leek, Cheddleton and Oakamoor) to Uttoxeter	4 January 1965 (to passengers); 3 July 1970 (to freight traffic); 1988 (to all traffic)	Part of the line (based at Rudyard) re-laid to 10 1/4 in (260 mm) Gauge, forming the Leek and Rudyard Railway. Also, the line between Leekbrook Junction and Oakamoor Sand Sidings is now preserved as the Churnet Valley Railway.
Clayton West branch line	L&YR (LMS)	Shepley Junction to Clayton West (via Skelmanthorpe)	24 January 1983 (to all traffic)	A stretch of the branch line, now re-laid to 15-inch Gauge as the Whistlestop Valley Railway.
Cleator and Workington Junction Railway	London and North Western Railway (LMS)	Workington to Cleator Moor	196? (to passengers); 1992 (to all traffic)	
Clevedon branch line	Bristol and Exeter Railway	Yatton to Clevedon	3 October 1966	
Clowne Branch	MR	Creswell to Staveley	5 July 1954 (to passengers); 20 July 2013 (to all traffic)	
Coalport branch line	LNWR	Hadley to Coalport	1952 (to passengers); 6 July 1964 (to all traffic)	
Cockermouth and Workington Railway	LNWR (LMS)	Workington to Cockermouth	196?	
Cockermouth, Keswick and Penrith Railway	LNWR (LMS)	Penrith to Cockermouth (via Blencow, Troutbeck, Keswick and Bassenthwaite)	6 March 1972	Most of the line, still remains, but now survives as a path
Coley branch line	Great Western Railway (GWR)	Coley Branch Junction to Reading Central goods depot	July 1983	Used in part as a walking route, and in part by the A33 road
Colne Valley and Halstead Railway	CV&HR	Chappel & Wakes Colne to Haverhill	30 December 1961 (to passengers); April 1965 (to all traffic)	Opened in stages from 1860 to 1863. In 1865, the GER opened a spur to Haverhill North and the LNER closed Haverhill South to passengers in 1924. Part of the route, now survives as the preserved Colne Valley Railway and the East Anglian Railway Museum is located at Chappel and Wakes Colne Station.
Coniston Railway		Foxfield to Coniston	6 October 1958 (to passengers); 30 April 1962 (to all traffic)	
Cornhill Branch	North Eastern Railway (LNER)	Alnwick to Coldstream	22 September 1930 (to passengers); 29 March 1965 (to all traffic)	Passenger services were temporarily restored during World War II to serve RAF Milfield. Destruction of a bridge during a storm in August 1948 closed the Ilderton to Wooler section before the remainder of the line, splitting it in two. The remaining Alnwick to Ilderton and Coldstream to Wooler sections closed on 2 March 1953 and 29 March 1965, respectively.
Corringham Light Railway	Kynoch	Thames Haven to Corringham via Kynochtown (now Coryton)	1952	Built under the Light Railways Act 1896 to link Kynoch's explosives factory to the London, Tilbury and Southend Railway at Thames Haven and to Corringham. Corringham section closed 1952, remainder in upgraded form serves Coryton Refinery. (1900/1-1952).
Cranleigh line	Horsham & Guildford Direct Railway	Horsham to Guildford via Cranleigh	14 June 1965	
Cranwell branch	GNR	Sleaford to Cranwell	November 1926 (to passengers); August 1956 (to all traffic)	
Cromford and High Peak Railway				
Cross Gates–Wetherby line	North Eastern Railway (LNER)	Cross Gates to Wetherby via Scholes, Thorner, Bardsey and Collingham Bridge	1964-65	
Crystal Palace and South London Junction Railway	London, Chatham, and Dover Railway (LCDR)	Nunhead to Crystal Palace	20 September 1954	
Cuckoo Line	LB&SCR	Polegate to Tunbridge Wells via Eridge	1965	
Culm Valley Light Railway	GWR	Tiverton Junction to Hemyock	1963	
Darlington and Barnard Castle Railway	Darlington and Barnard Castle Railway (LNER)	North Road to Barnard Castle	30 November 1964 (to passengers); 5 April 1965 (to all traffic)	
Dauntsey–Malmesbury branch line	Great Western Railway	Dauntsey to Malmesbury	1962	
Dearne Valley Railway	Lancashire and Yorkshire Railway	Brierley to Doncaster	10 September 1951	
Deerness Valley branch line	North Eastern Rly	Durham to Crook, via Ushaw Moor and Waterhouses	29 October 1951 (to passengers); 28 December 1964 (to all traffic)	Though line opened to serve collieries in 1858, a passenger services was not introduced until 1877 and only ever operated east of Waterhouses.
Delph Donkey	LNWR	Delph to Oldham	April 1955 (to passengers); November 1963 (to all traffic)	
Derbyshire and Staffordshire extension	Great Northern Railway		1964 (to passengers); 1968 (to freight)	
Derwent Branch	Maryport and Carlisle Railway	Bullgill to Brigham	29 April 1935	
Derwent Valley Railway	North Eastern Rly	Scotswood to Consett, via Swalwell, Rowlands Gill, Ebchester, Shotley Bridge and Blackhill	1 February 1954 (to passengers); 11 November 1963 (to all traffic)	
Derwent Valley Light Railway	North Eastern Railway	York to Selby, via Layerthorpe, Dunnington and Wheldrake	27 September 1981 (to all traffic)	A short section of the line at the Yorkshire Museum of Farming is now preserved as a heritage railway (of the same name).
Devizes branch line	Great Western Railway	Patney & Chirton to Holt Junction, via Devizes and Bromham	1966 (to all traffic)	
Devon and Cornwall Railway	LSWR	Exeter to Plymouth	1968	Opened in 1862. Closed between Meldon Junction and Bere Alston. Remainder of line still in use, mostly as a freight line. Part of the Line (between Okehampton and Yeoford) now preserved as the Dartmoor Railway.
Devon and Somerset Railway	GWR	Taunton to Barnstaple, via Dulverton, South Molton and Swimbridge	1966	
Didcot, Newbury and Southampton Railway	DN&SR	Didcot to Shawford Junction	1967	
Doe Lea branch line	Midland Railway		1930	
Dover Marine or Dover Western Docks				For boat trains from Chatham Main Line / SER Main Line
Downham and Stoke Ferry Railway	GER	Downham to Stoke Ferry	22 September 1930 (to passengers); 1982 (to all traffic)	
Driffield to Malton line	North Eastern Railway	Malton to Driffield, via Wharram, Burdale and Wetwang	1958 (to all traffic)	Part of the line is being rebuilt as the heritage Yorkshire Wolds Railway.
Dudding Hill line	Midland Railway	Acton to Cricklewood	1902 (to passengers)	Remains in use for freight
Duffield–Wirksworth branch line	Midland Railway (LMS)	Duffield to Wirksworth (via Hazelwood, Shottle and Iridgehay)	1947 (to passengers); 196? (to goods); 1989 (to all traffic)	Entire branch line now preserved as the Ecclesbourne Valley Railway.
Dungeness branch line	South Eastern Railway	Appledore Junction to Dungeness, via, Lydd Town	1967 (to passengers)	Part of the line still open to serve Dungeness Power Station
Dunstable Branch Lines	London and North Western Railway (LNWR)/Hertford, Luton and Dunstable Railway	Leighton Buzzard to Welwyn via Dunstable	26 April 1965 (to passengers); 1990 (to goods)	Track between Leighton Buzzard and Dunstable removed shortly after passenger services withdrawn. Line between Dunstable and the Midland Main Line (at Luton) remained open until 1990. Luton to Dunstable Busway uses the old trackbed.
Durham to Bishop Auckland Line	North Eastern Railway (LNER)	Durham to Bishop Auckland, via Brancepeth and Hunwick	4 May 1964 (to passengers); 10 August 1964 (to goods); 1968 (to all traffic)	
Durham to Sunderland line	Durham and Sunderland Railway/ NER (LNER)	Durham Elvet/Shincliffe Town to Sunderland, via Pittington, Hetton, Murton and Ryhope	1 January 1931 (to passengers, west of Pittington); 5 January 1953 (to passengers, east of Pittington); 11 January 1954 (to all traffic, west of Pittington); 3 April 1960 (to all traffic, west of Hetton); 11 November 1964 (to all traffic, west of Murton); 1991 (to all traffic, east of Murton)	The line originally terminated outside of the City of Durham at Shincliffe Town station but the section between there and Sherburn House closed on 24 July 1893 when the route into Durham Elvet opened. Partially converted to footpath (part of the Hart to Haswell Walkway, east of Murton).
Dursley branch line	Midland Railway (LMS)	Coaley Junction to Dursley	1962 (to passengers); 1968 (to freight); 1970 (to all traffic)	
Easingwold Railway		Alne to Easingwold	29 November 1948 (to passengers); 30 December 1957 (to all traffic)	
East and West Yorkshire Union Railways		Stourton to Lofthouse	1 October 1904 (to passengers); 3 October 1966 (to all traffic)	
East Kent Light Rlys				A series of lines built under the Light Railways Act 1896 from 1911 to 1917 around the East Kent Coalfield. Closed with decline of coalfield. Part of the line, between (Shepherdswell and Eythorne) now preserved as the East Kent Railway.
East Lincolnshire line	Great Northern Railway (LNER)	Boston to Grimsby, (via Firsby, Louth and Ludborough)	1970 (to passengers); 1980 (to all traffic)	A stretch of the line now preserved forming the Lincolnshire Wolds Railway. Whilst other part of the line from Boston to Skegness remains open (as part of the national network).
Eden Valley line	Stockton and Darlington Railway (LNER)	Penrith to Kirkby Stephen (via Temple Sowerby and Warcop)	1962/63	Part of the line, now survives (between Appleby East and Warcop) as the preserved Eden Valley Railway.
Edenham and Little Bytham Railway		Little Bytham to Edenham	17 October 1871 (to passengers); 1884 (to all traffic)	
Edgware, Highgate and London Railway		Edgware to Finsbury Park		
Elham Valley line	SER	Canterbury West to Folkestone West, via Bishopsbourne and Elham	1947	Opened in 1890 by SER, lasted until 1947. Branch Line ran for 16 miles
Elsenham and Thaxted Light Railway	Elsenham and Thaxted Light Railway	Elsenham to Thaxted	15 September 1952 (to passengers); 1 June 1953 (to all traffic)	Last rail line built in Essex (1913), until the construction of Stansted Airport railway station (1991)
Ely and Huntingdon Railway		Huntingdon to St Ives		
Ely and St Ives Railway	GER	Ely to St Ives	2 February 1931 (to passengers); 5 October 1964 (to all traffic)	
Eryholme–Richmond branch line	Y&NR	Eryholme to Richmond	1969	Opened in 1846. Catterick sub-branch constructed during WWI
Exe Valley Line	GWR	Dulverton to Exeter St David's, via Tiverton and Cadeleigh	7 October 1963	
Eye Branch		Mellis to Eye	2 February 1931 (to passengers); 13 July 1964 (to all traffic)	
Fairford branch line	Oxford, Witney and Fairford Railway (GWR)	Yarnton to Fairford, via Witney	18 June 1962 (to passengers); 2 November 1970 (to all traffic)	
Fairlop Loop	Great Eastern Railway	Woodford to Ilford	1956	Woodford to Newbury Park was transferred to London Underground Central line in 1947–8, but Ilford and Seven Kings to Newbury Park connections removed by 1956. Freight trains on remaining section operated by BR until 1965
Fallowfield Loop	Great Central Rly (LNER)	Manchester Central to Fairfield, via Fallowfield	1983-8 (to all traffic)	
Fareham–Gosport Line	LSWR	Fareham to Gosport	6 June 1953 (to passengers); 6 January 1969 (to all traffic)	
Faringdon branch		Uffington to Faringdon	1951 (to passengers); 1964 (to all traffic)	
Fawley branch line	Southern Railway	Totton to Fawley, via Hythe	14 February 1966 (to passengers); 1 September 2016 (to all traffic)	Part of the line, still extant as far as Marchwood; Goods traffic continued onto Fawley Refinery until 2016.
Ferryhill to Bishop Auckland line	Clarence Railway/ NER (LNER)	Ferryhill to Bishop Auckland, via Spennymoor and Byers Green	4 December 1939 (to passengers, west of Spennymoor); 31 March 1952 (to passengers, east of Spennymoor); 2 June 1958 (to all traffic, west of Spennymoor); 2 May 1966 (to all traffic, east of Spennymoor)	As originally built, this line continued west from Byers Green towards Billy Row via the West Durham Railway and intermittent passenger services operated over the line to Tod Hills during the mid 19th Century. A more permanent passenger service was later introduced when the NER diverted the line's western terminus to Bishop Auckland in 1885.
Filey (Butlins Triangle) branch line	London & North Eastern Railway	Hunmanby to Filey, via Filey Holiday Camp	17 July 1977	former station site, still standing/clearly visible, though disused and overgrown
Fleetwood branch line	Preston and Wyre Joint Railway	Poulton-le-Fylde to Fleetwood, via Thornton–Cleveleys and Burn Naze Halt	1 June 1970 (to passengers); 1999 (to all traffic)	Most of the branch line, still remains in place (with the track also intact), but currently disused, The line is currently being restored as a Heritage Railway.
Folkestone Harbour branch line	South Eastern Railway (England)	Folkestone East to Folkestone Harbour	2001 (to regular services); 2009 (to Venice Simplon Orient Express service); 2014 (line fully closed)	Railway up to Harbour viaduct intact, however is very overgrown. Viaduct to Harbour station railway track was removed in 2016 and is now restored as a public exhibit.
Forest of Dean Railway		Newnham to Whimsey and Drybridge	3 November 1958 (to passengers); 3 August 1967 (to all traffic)	
Foss Islands branch line		York to Foss Islands	8 July 1988 (to passengers); 1989 (to all traffic)	Connected to the Derwent Valley Light Railway at York (Layerthorpe) railway station
Framlingham branch	Eastern Counties Railway (ECR)	Wickham Market to Framlingham	1 November 1952 (to passengers); 19 April 1965 (to freight)	
Fullerton to Hurstbourne Line	LSWR	Fullerton Junction to Hurstbourne	6 July 1931 (to passengers); 28 May 1956 (to all traffic)	
Garstang and Knot-End Railway	GKER	Garstang to Knott End-on-Sea	1963	Opened 1870 to Pilling, completed by Knott End Railway in 1908
Gilling and Pickering line	NER	Gilling to Pickering	2 February 1953 (to passengers); 1964 (to all traffic)	
Glasson Dock branch line	LNWR	Lancaster to Glasson Dock	1930	Opened 1883
Glazebrook East Junction–Skelton Junction line	Cheshire Lines Committee	Glazebrook to Skelton Junction	1964 (to passengers); 1983 (to freight)	
Gloucester loop line	Midland Railway (LMS)	Barnt Green to Ashchurch, via Alcester and Evesham	1962–5 (to all traffic)	Part of the line, still extant as far as Redditch.
Gobowen to Welshpool line	Cambrian Railway (GWR)	Gobowen to Welshpool (via Oswestry, Llynclys, Pant, Llanymynech and Pool Quay)	1966 (to passengers); Closed in 1971 (to freight); Closed in 1988 (to all traffic)	Now restored as a heritage railway (based at both Oswestry and Llynclys).
Golden Valley Railway		Pontrilas to Hay-on-Wye	15 December 1941 (to passengers); 3 June 1957 (to all traffic)	
Grantham and Lincoln line	Great Northern Railway	Grantham to Lincoln via Honington	1965	
Grassington branch line	Midland Railway (LMS)	Skipton to Grassington, via Rylstone and Swinden	22 September 1930 (to passengers); 11 August 1969 (to freight)	Still extant, as far as Swinden (freight only)
Gravesend West Line	LCDR	Longfield Halt to Gravesend West	1968	Opened in 1886. Passenger traffic ceased in 1953.
Great Central and Midland Joint Railway	GCR / MR			
Great Central Main Line	Great Central Railway (LNER)	London (Marylebone) to Sheffield (Victoria)	1966–69 (in stages)	Parts of the GCR still open between London Marylebone to Verney Junction north of Aylesbury. Two stretches of the former Great Central Main Line now preserved as the Great Central Railway (Nottingham) (between Ruddington and Loughborough Junction), and as the Great Central Railway (between Loughborough Central and Leicester North).
Great Northern and Great Eastern Joint Railway	Great Northern Rly/ Great Eastern Rly (Jointly)	Drax to Huntingdon, via Haxey Junction, Lincoln and March		
Great Northern and London and North Western Joint Railway	Great Northern Railway/London and North Western Railway		Closed in stages by 1970	
Great Harwood Line	Lancashire and Yorkshire Railway (LMS)	Blackburn to Burnley via Rishton, Great Harwood, Simonstone, Padiham and Rose Grove	1957; 1993 (to all traffic)	Opened in two stages between 1875 and 1877. Known as the North Lancashire Loop; Most of the line, now converted to a path
Gretna Branch	NBR	Longtown to Gretna	9 August 1915 (to passengers)	Remains partially open to serve MOD Longtown
Guisborough to Brotton line	Cleveland Railway/ NER (LNER)	Hutton Gate to Brotton/North Skelton, via Boosbeck	2 May 1960 (to passengers); 1963 (to all traffic, west of Boosbeck); 12 September 1964 (to all traffic, east of Boosbeck)	The line followed the eastern section of the earlier Cleveland Railway mineral line which had originally continued north through Guisborough to Eston and Normanby via a number of inclines however this section was dismantled in 1873. Though it bypassed Guisborough station, special working practices were put in place that permitted trains to reverse onto the short branch into the station before continuing over the Middlesbrough to Guisborough line.
Gwinear–Helston branch line	Great Western Railway	Gwinear Road to Helston	1964	A stretch of the former Branch line now preserved as the Helston Railway.
Hadleigh Railway	Eastern Union Railway	Bentley to Hadleigh	29 February 1932 (to passengers); 19 April 1965 (to all traffic)	
Halesowen Railway	GWR / MR	Longbridge to Old Hill	1919 (to passengers); 1964 (to all traffic)	
Hall Farm Curve		Lea Valley lines: connected Stratford to Tottenham Hale line with Liverpool Street to Chingford line.	1970	TfL stated in 2023 that the curve could potentially be reconstructed.
Haltwhistle–Alston branch line	Newcastle & Carlisle Railway (LNER)	Haltwhistle to Alston (via Featherstone Park, Lambley and Slaggyford)	1 May 1976 (to all traffic)	The 2 ft (610 mm) gauge South Tynedale Railway has reopened 5 miles (8.0 km) of the original line between Alston and Slaggyford.
Hamworthy Freight Branch	Southampton and Dorchester Railway	Hamworthy to Poole Docks	1896 (to passengers)	
Hammersmith Branch	N&SWJR	South Acton to Hammersmith	1 January 1917 (to passengers); 3 May 1965 (to all traffic)	
Hammersmith (Grove Road) Branch	LSWR	Richmond Junction to Studland Road Junction via Hammersmith (Grove Road)	5 June 1916	
Harrogate to Northallerton line	Leeds Northern Rly Co (NER)	Harrogate to Northallerton, via Ripon and Melmerby	1967–69	Formed part of the Leeds-Northallerton Railway
Harborne branch line	LNWR	closed to passenger traffic in 1934	1963	The trackbed is now the Harborne nature walkway. Part of the line could be reopened.
Harpenden to Hemel Hempstead line	Midland Railway (LMS)	Harpenden to Hemel Hempstead	1959 (to regular traffic); 1979–82 (to all traffic)	Known as the Nickey Line, Most of the route, now converted to a Path
Harrogate–Church Fenton line	North Eastern Railway (LNER)	Harrogate to Church Fenton via Wetherby and Tadcaster	1964–65	
Hartlepool–Ferryhill line	Hartlepool Dock and Railway Co./ Great North of England, Clarence and Hartlepool Junction Railway/ NER (LNER)	West Hartlepool/Hartlepool to Ferryhill, via Hart, Castle Eden, Trimdon and West Cornforth	9 June 1952 (to passengers); 197? (to all traffic, east of Raisby Hill Quarry); 198? (to all traffic, west of Raisby Hill Quarry)	
Hartlepool–Murton line	Hartlepool Dock and Railway Co./ Durham and Sunderland Railway/ NER (LNER)	West Hartlepool/Hartlepool to Murton, via Hart, Castle Eden, Wellfield, Haswell and South Hetton	9 June 1952 (to passengers); 1966 (to goods); 198? (to all traffic, south of South Hetton Junction); 1991 (to all traffic, north of South Hetton Junction)	The section through Haswell and South Hetton was dismantled when stopping goods traffic was withdrawn in 1966. The remaining sections of the line were maintained to provide mainline connections for the National Coal Board's South Hetton Railway system. Most of the route converted to the Hart to Haswell Walkway
Hatfield and St Albans Railway	Hatfield and St Albans Railway Company/Great Northern Railway (GNR)	Hatfield to St Albans Abbey	28 September 1951 (to passengers); 31 December 1968 (to freight)	
Hawes branch line	Midland Railway (LMS)	Garsdale (Hawes Junction) to Hawes	16 March 1959 (to passenger traffic) ?? April 1964 (to all traffic)	Hawes railway station, now forms part of the "Dales Countryside Museum" An ex-industrial RS&Hawthorne Steam locomotive and a rake of three ex-BR passenger coaches stand alongside the adjacent station platform on display.
Hawkhurst branch line	SER	Paddock Wood to Hawkhurst	1961	Opened in 1892 and ran for a distance of 11 1/2 miles.
Hayfield branch	Midland Railway (LMS)	Hayfield to New Mills	1970	Trackbed of the Line, now forms the Sett Valley Trail.
Haywards Heath to Horsted Keynes branch line	London, Brighton & South Coast Railway	Horsted Keynes to Haywards Heath, via Ardingly and Copyhold Junction	28 October 1963	Portion of the line, (between Horsted Keynes and Ardingly) now owned by the Bluebell Railway. Whilst the other half of the line, still open to locally serve the Aggregate Depot.
Headcorn to Robertsbridge line	Kent & East Sussex Railway Co/ South Eastern Railway (SR)	Robertsbridge to Headcorn, via Tenterden	1954 (to passengers); 1961 (to freight); 1970–2 (to all traffic)	1900 to 54/61 – Built under the Light Railways Act 1896, with a large part of the whole line now closed, 10 mile stretch of track now preserved (between Tenterden and Junction Road) as the Kent and East Sussex Railway. Another section of the Line (based at Robertsbridge), is also preserved.
Henbury Loop Line		Avonmouth to Filton	1964 (to passengers)	Remains open for freight. Proposal to reopen for passengers
Hereford, Ross and Gloucester Railway	Great Western Railway	Gloucester to Hereford via Ross-on-Wye	196?	
Hertford and Welwyn Junction Railway	Great Northern Railway	Welwyn Garden City to Ware via Cole Green and Hertford Cowbridge	18 June 1951 (Hertford Cowbridge closed in 1924)	
Hertford, Luton and Dunstable Railway		Welwyn to Dunstable	26 April 1965 (to passengers); 1966 (to all traffic)	Partly reopened as the Luton to Dunstable Busway
Hexham–Allendale branch line	Hexham and Allendale Railway (LNER)	Hexham to Allendale	22 September 1930 (to passengers); 20 November 1950 (to all traffic)	
Hexham to Riccarton Junction line	Border Counties Railway; NBR (LNER)	Hexham to Riccarton Junction, via Reedsmouth, Bellingham North Tyne and Plashetts	15 October 1956 (to passengers); 1 September 1958 (to goods); 11 November 1963 (to all traffic)	The tracks were dismantled from all but the Reedsmouth to Bellingham section in 1959, which was accessed via the Wansbeck Railway from Morpeth until 11 November 1963. A very short section of the line (including Saughtree station) now restored (but privately).
Hincaster branch line	Furness Railway (LMS)	Arnside to Hincaster, via Sandside and Heversham	4 May 1942 (to passengers); 1966 (to freight); 1972 (to all traffic)	
Higham Ferrers branch line	Midland Railway (LMS)	Wellingborough to Higham Ferrers (via Rushden)	1959 (to passengers); Closed in 1971 (to all traffic)	A section of the branch now preserved, as part of the Rushden Transport Museum.
Highworth branch line	Great Western Railway	Swindon to Highworth	2 March 1953 (to passengers); 1962 (to all traffic)	
Holmfirth branch line	Lancashire & Yorkshire Railway (LMS)	Brockholes to Holmfirth, via Thongsbridge	31 October 1959 (to passengers); 28 April 1965 (to all traffic)	
Honeybourne Line	Great Western Railway	Cheltenham to Stratford-upon-Avon (via Honeybourne)	7 March 1960 (to passengers) ?? August 1976 (to all traffic)	A lengthy majority of the line now preserved as the Gloucestershire-Warwickshire Railway.
Hooton–West Kirby branch	Birkenhead Railway (London & North Western Railway and Great Western Railway Joint Line) (LMS/GWR)	Hooton Junction to West Kirby, via Hadlow Road, Neston South, Parkgate, Heswall, Thurstaston, Caldy and Kirby Park	17 September 1956 (to passenger traffic); 7 May 1962 (to all traffic)	Almost entire route converted to Wirral Country Park cycle way in 1973. Hadlow Road station restored to 1950s condition (complete with a short length of demonstration track) for use as Country Park visitor centre.
Horbury West Curve	Lancashire & Yorkshire Railway (LMS)	Horbury & Ossett station to Crigglestone West Junction, via Canal Sidings	11 September 1961 (to passenger traffic); 4 February 1991 (to all traffic)	Disused, but still entirely intact throughout
Horncastle branch line	Great Northern Railway	Woodhall Junction to Horncastle	13 September 1954 (to passengers); 6 April 1971 (to all traffic)	
Hull and Barnsley Railway	North Eastern Railway	Cudworth to Hull Paragon, via Wrangbrook Junction, Drax Abbey and Little Weighton	193? (to passengers); 195? (to freight); 197? (to all traffic)	
Hull and Barnsley and Great Central Joint Railway		Aire Junction to Braithwell Junction	September 1970	
Hull to Holderness branch line	North Eastern Railway		1964	
Hull to Hornsea branch line	North Eastern Railway		1964	
Hundred of Hoo Railway		Gravesend to Allhallows	4 December 1961 (to passengers)	Remains open for freight
Ilfracombe branch line	LSWR (Southern Railway)	Barnstaple to Ilfracombe, via Wrafton, Braunton and Mortehoe & Woolacombe	1970 (to passengers); 1975 (to all traffic)	
Ingleton to Tebay line	Lancaster and Carlisle Railway (LMS)	Ingleton to Tebay	1954	Opened 1861. Tracks lifted 1967.
Skipton–Ilkley line	Midland Railway (LMS)	Ilkley to Skipton (via Addingham, Bolton Abbey and Embsay)	22 March 1965 (to passengers); January 1966 (to all traffic)	A four mile stretch of the line now preserved as the Embsay & Bolton Abbey Steam Railway.
Kelso Branch	YN&BR	Tweedmouth to Kelso	15 June 1964 (to passengers); 29 March 1965 (to all traffic)	
Kelvedon and Tollesbury Light Railway		Kelvedon to Tollesbury Pier	7 May 1951 (to passengers); 28 September 1962 (to all traffic)	
Kemble to Cirencester branch line	Great Western Railway	Kemble to Cirencester	6 April 1964	
Kemp Town branch line	LB&SCR/SR/SR	Kemp Town Junction to Kemp Town railway station	26 June 1971	
Kettering, Thrapston and Huntingdon Railway		Kettering to Huntingdon	15 June 1959 (passengers); 27 July 1971 (all traffic)	
King's Lynn to Dereham line	Great Eastern Railway (LNER)	Dereham to King's Lynn, via Swaffham	7 September 1968	3 mile section (as far as Middleton Towers) still exists (freight only)
Kingsbridge branch line		Brent to Kingsbridge	14 September 1963	
Kingswear branch line	Great Western Railway	Newton Abbot to Kingswear (via Torquay, Paignton and Churston)	1972 (Paignton-Kingswear section, only)	Part of the line between Newton Abbot and Paignton still open as part of the National Network's Riviera Line 7 mile stretch of track now preserved, (between Paignton and Kingswear) as the Dartmouth Steam Railway.
Kirkburton branch line	London & North Western Railway (LMS)	Deighton to Kirkburton, via Kirkheaton	28 July 1930 (to passengers); 5 April 1965 (to all traffic)	
Kirkstead and Little Steeping Railway	Great Northern Railway (LNER)	Firsby to Woodhall Junction	5 October 1970	
Lambourn Valley Railway	LVR	Newbury to Lambourn	1973	Opened in 1893; part of the Great Western Railway from 1905.
Lancashire, Derbyshire and East Coast Railway		Chesterfield and Sheffield to Lincoln	19 September 1955	
Lancashire Union Railway	LUR	Blackburn to St Helens	1960	Opened in 1869; St Helens to Wigan still in use
Lanchester Valley Railway	North Eastern Railway	Durham to Blackhill, via Lanchester	1 May 1939 (to passengers); 5 July 1965 (to goods); 20 June 1966 (to all traffic)	
Langton Dock Branch			26 April 1968	
Leamington–Rugby line	London and North Western Railway (LMS)	Leamington Spa to Rugby	June 1959	
Leamside line	Durham Junction Railway/ Newcastle and Darlington Junction Railway/ NER (LNER)	Ferryhill and Durham to Pelaw, via Shincliffe, Leamside, Penshaw, Washington and Usworth	28 July 1941 (to passengers, south of Leamside); 4 May 1964 (to passengers, north of Leamside); 1991 (to all traffic)	Track still down (although overgrown) Between Pelaw and Washington.
Ledbury and Gloucester Railway	GWR	Ledbury to Gloucester	1959 (to passengers); 1964 (to goods)	
Leeds and Bradford Extension Railway	L&BER	Skipton to Colne via Elslack, Thornton-In-Craven, Earby and Foulridge	1970	Opened in 1848. The Shipley-to-Skipton section of the line is still in use. whilst the Skipton-Colne section had now long since closed.
Leeds Northern Railway		Leeds to Thirsk via Harrogate	1959	Section between Harrogate and Leeds still extant as part of the Harrogate line
Leeds New Line	London & North Western Railway (LMS)	Leeds to Huddersfield, via Gomersal, Cleckheaton, Heckmondwike and Battyeford	1960–65 (to regular traffic, in stages); 1980 (to all traffic)	Now converted to a path
Leek and Manifold Valley Light Railway			1934	Now converted to a footpath
Leek–Waterhouses branch line	North Staffordshire Railway	Leekbrook Junction to Waterhouses, via Bradnop, Ipstones, Winkhill and Cauldon Lowe	30 September 1935 (to passengers); 1964 (to goods); 1988 (to all traffic)	Part of the former branch (currently as far as Ipstones) now part of the Churnet Valley Railway
Leen Valley Lines	Great Northern Railway		14 September 1931 (to passengers)	
Leicester and Swannington Railway			1964	
Leicester – Rugby Line	Midland Counties Railway	Leicester to Rugby	1 January 1962	Remaining part of the Midland Counties Railway survives as part of the Midland Main Line
Leicester Branch	Great Northern and London and North Western Joint Railway	Leicester Belgrave Road to Marefield Junction	7 December 1953	
Leominster and Kington Railway	Great Western Railway	Leominster to New Radnor	1966	Small Section of the line, now privately preserved as the Kingfisher Line (at Titley Junction).
Lewes and East Grinstead Railway	LB&SCR	Lewes to East Grinstead (via Barcombe, Sheffield Park, Horsted Keynes and Kingscote)	1958	An 11 mile stretch of the line now preserved (between Sheffield Park and East Grinstead) as the Bluebell Railway. Whilst the line (north of East Grinstead, itself) forms part of the Oxted line.
Lincolnshire loop line	Great Northern Railway (LNER)	Gainsborough to Peterborough, via Lincoln, Woodhall Junction, Boston and Spalding	17 June 1963	
"Little" North Western Railway	Midland Railway (LMS)	Skipton to Morecambe, via Hellifield, Wennington, Clapham and Lancaster	1966	Opened in two stages in 1848 and 1849. Approximately two-thirds of the route (between Lancaster and Caton) is now a combined cyclepath and footpath. Whilst, the remainder of the line from Wennington to Skipton is still in use, (as is the other line in-between Wennington and Carnforth).
Liverpool Overhead Railway		Seaforth to Dingle	30 December 1956	
Liverpool, Southport and Preston Junction Railway	LS&PJR	Southport to Altcar and Hillhouse	1952	Opened 1887. A short section through Meols Cop in Southport is still in use.
Liverpool, St Helens and South Lancashire Railway		St Helens to Glazebrook	1952 (to passengers)	
Long Melford–Bury St Edmunds branch line	GER	Long Melford to Bury St Edmunds	19 April 1965	
Lynn and Hunstanton Railway		King's Lynn to Hunstanton	5 May 1969	
Macclesfield, Bollington and Marple Railway	MSLR and NSR	Macclesfield to Marple	1970	Re-opened 1985 by Dr. David Bellamy as the Middlewood Way.
Malmesbury branch line		Dauntsey to Malmesbury	8 September 1951 (to passengers); 11 November 1962 (to all traffic)	
Manchester to Accrington Line	Lancashire and Yorkshire Railway (LMS)	Manchester Victoria to Accrington Junction, (via Whitefield, Bury, Ramsbottom and Helmshore)	1966 (to regular passengers); 1972 (to all passengers); 1980 (to coal traffic); 1981 (to all traffic, north of bury); 1991 (to all traffic, south of bury)	An 8 1/2-mile stretch of the line now preserved (between Bury Bolton Street and Stubbins Junction) as the East Lancashire Railway. Whilst The Bury Line now occupies part of the line between Manchester Victoria and Bury Interchange as part of the Manchester Metrolink.
Manchester, Buxton, Matlock and Midland Junction Railway	Midland Railway (LMS)	Ambergate to Buxton, (via Matlock, Rowsley, Bakewell and Millers Dale)	6 March 1967 (to passengers); 29 June 1968 (to all traffic)	Part of the route, now preserved (between Matlock and Rowsley, via Darley Dale) as Peak Rail. Whilst the route beyond (the south of) Matlock itself to Ambergate Junction remains open as part of the National Network. Also, a section of the line (through Ashwood Dale, between Buxton and the one-time triangular junction) towards the Peak Forest Area still exists
Manchester, South Junction and Altrincham Railway		Altrincham to Manchester London Road	24 December 1991	Converted to Manchester Metrolink in 1992
Manchester South District Railway	Midland Railway	Cornbrook to Stockport	2 Jan 1967 (to passengers); 1969 (to all traffic)	Reopened as part of the Manchester Metrolink
Manchester and Wigan Railway		Eccles to Wigan	3 May 1969	
Mangotsfield and Bath branch line	Midland Railway (LMS/GWR)	Mangotsfield to Bath Green Park (via Bitton)	1966 (to passengers); 1971 (to all traffic)	A 3-mile stretch of the line now preserved as the Avon Valley Railway.
Mansfield Railway	GCR	Kirkby to Mansfield	2 January 1956 (to passengers); 2003 (to all traffic)	
Margate Sands line	South Eastern Railway (England)	Ashford International, Canterbury West and Ramsgate	1926 (closed)	Branch line used as a goods depot until 1972. Now redeveloped as an amusement arcade.
Melbourne line	London Midland & Scottish Railway	Derby to Ashby de la Zouch, via Melbourne	21 May 1980	
Meltham branch line	Lancashire & Yorkshire Rly	Lockwood to Meltham, via Netherton	21 May 1949 (to passengers); 3 April 1965 (to all traffic)	
Melmerby-Masham branch line	North Eastern Railway	Melmerby to Masham, via West Tanfield	1931 (to passengers); 1963 (to all traffic)	
Meon Valley line	London & South Western Rly	Fareham to Alton, via Wickham and Droxford	5 February 1955 (to passengers); 30 April 1962 (to freight); 1968 (to all traffic)	
Merton Abbey branch	LB&SCR LSWR (joint)	Tooting Junction to Merton Park	3 March 1929 (to passengers); 5 May 1975 (to all traffic)	
Methley Joint Railway	West Yorkshire Railway		1964 (to passengers); 1981 (to all traffic)	
Micklehurst Line	London & North Western Railway (LMS)	Diggle to Staybridge, via Uppermill Friezland and Micklehurst	1 January 1917 (to passengers); 15 June 1964 (to Freight); 3 October 1966 (to further traffic)	Constructed because a new line along the east bank of the River Tame was deemed to be more cost-effective than four tracking the existing line on the west bank.
Mid-Suffolk Light Railway		Haughley to Laxfield	28 July 1952	
Midhurst Railways		Petersfield to Midhurst Pulborough to Midhurst Chicester to Midhurst	1955 (to passengers); 1966 (to goods)	
Midland and Great Northern Joint Railway	GNR/ Merger of earlier railways		1959 (to passengers); Closed in 1964 (to all traffic)	Cromer–Sheringham section still extant as part of the nearby Bittern Line 5 1/2 mile stretch of track, now preserved as the Heritage North Norfolk Railway.
Midland and South Western Junction Railway	GWR/ Merger of earlier railways	Cheltenham to Andover	1961	A stretch of the line is now preserved as the Swindon & Cricklade Railway.
Middlesbrough to Guisborough branch line	Middlesbrough and Guisborough Railway/ NER (LNER)	Middlesbrough to Guisborough via Nunthorpe and Pinchinthorpe	2 March 1964 (to passengers); 31 August 1964 (to all traffic)	East of Morton Junction, the line is still in passenger use as part of the Esk Valley Line. Most of the remainder of the former branch is now a public footpath.
Middleton Junction and Oldham Branch Railway	Manchester & Leeds Railway	Middleton Junction to Oldham	7 January 1963	
Middleton line connection via Beza Road	Charles Brandling/The Middleton Railway Trust Ltd.	Hallam and Pontefract line through Beza Road to Moor Road	1990 (Connection line closed, events only)	Line intact however is currently bolted closed, preventing access. Used for special events only.
Moretonhampstead and South Devon Railway		Newton Abbot to Moretonhampstead	28 February 1959 (to passengers); 6 April 1964 (to goods)	Section from Heathfield to Newton Abbot remains open to freight
Muswell Hill Railway			3 July 1954	
Nantwich to Market Drayton line	GWR	Market Drayton to Nantwich, via Adderley, Coxbank and Audlem	1963 (to passengers); 1967 (to freight); 1970 (to all traffic)	
Newcastle and North Shields Railway		Newcastle (Carliol Square) to Tynemouth		Majority of the route converted to form part of the Tyne and Wear Metro Yellow line
Newmarket Railway	Newmarket Railway Company	Great Chesterford to Newmarket	1851?	One of the first railway closures in British history
Norfolk and Suffolk Joint Railway	GER / MGNJ	North Walsham to Cromer		
Northallerton to Hawes line		Northallerton to Hawes (via Leeming Bar, Leyburn and Aysgarth)	1954 (to passengers); Closed in 1992 (to all traffic)	A 22-mile stretch of the line now preserved as the Wensleydale Railway.
Northampton and Banbury Junction Railway		Blisworth to Banbury	7 April 1952 (to passengers); February 1964 (to all traffic)	
Northampton and Peterborough Railway	London and Birmingham Railway	Blisworth to Peterborough	2 May 1964 (to passengers); 1974 (to all traffic)	A 7.5 mile stretch of the line is now preserved as the Nene Valley Railway
Northampton–Market Harborough line	London and North Western Railway (LMS)	Northampton to Market Harborough	16 August 1981 (to all traffic)	A stretch of the line now preserved as the Northampton and Lamport Railway.
North Cornwall Railway	LSWR	Halwill Junction to Padstow (via Launceston, Camelford and Wadebridge)	1964	2 miles of track re-laid to narrow gauge, as the Launceston Steam Railway.
North Devon and Cornwall Junction Light Railway	North Devon Railway (LSWR)	Torrington to Halwell Junction (via Meeth and Hatherleigh)	1964/65 (to passengers); 1978 (to freight); 1982 (to all traffic)	Small section (based at Torrington) now being restored as the Tarka Valley Railway.
North Devon Railway	North Devon Railway (LSWR)	Exeter to Torrington	1965 (to passengers); 1982 (to freight)	Section from Exeter to Barnstaple remains open as the Tarka Line
North Lindsey Light Railway	NLLR	Scunthorpe to Whitton	1951	Short section of the line still open, (freight only)
North Liverpool Extension Line			1972	
North Mersey Branch	Lancashire and Yorkshire Railway	Kirkby to Mersey Docks	1991	
North Sunderland Railway	North Sunderland Railway (LNER)	Chathill to Seahouses	27 October 1951	The line was independently financed and, though operated with North Eastern Railway locomotives from 1902, remained under independent control until 1939 when the LNER took over its management
North Wylam loop line	Scotswood, Newburn and Wylam Railway (LNER)	Scotswood to Prudhoe, via North Wylam	11 March 1968 (to passengers); April 1972 (to all traffic, west of Newburn); December 1986 (to all traffic, east of Newburn)	Partially following the route of the Wylam Waggonway, the line was famed for having passed almost directly in front of George Stephenson's Birthplace
Norton Fitzwarren to Minehead branch line	Great Western Railway	Norton Fitzwarren to Minehead via, Crowcombe-Heathfield, Williton and Blue Anchor	2 January 1971 (to all traffic)	Most of the entire branch line now preserved as the West Somerset Railway.
Nottingham Suburban Railway	GNR	Nottingham London Road to Daybrook	14 September 1931 (to passengers); 1 August 1951 (to all traffic)	
Nuneaton to Ashby Junction line	Ashby and Nuneaton Joint Railway (LNWR/Midland Railway)	Nuneaton Abbey Street to Ashby Junction, via Shackerstone	1965 (to passengers); 1971 (to all traffic)	A 5-mile stretch of track now preserved as the Battlefield Line.
Okehampton–Bude line	London & South Western Rly	Okehampton to Bude, via Halwill Junction and Holsworthy	1 October 1966	
Oldham, Ashton and Guide Bridge Railway		Guide Bridge to Oldham via Ashton	4 May 1959 (to passengers); 29 January 1968 (to freight)	
Oldham Loop Line	Manchester & Leeds Rly (LMS)	Rochdale to Manchester Victoria, via Oldham and Royton Junction	3 October 2009 (to all traffic)	Now converted to light-rail use, as part of the Manchester Metrolink.
Ossett and Batley Branch Line	West Yorkshire Railway	Wakefield to Batley	1965	
Oswestry, Ellesmere and Whitchurch Railway		Whitchurch to Oswestry via Ellesmere	18 January 1965	
Otley and Ilkley Joint Railway	North Eastern Rly/Midland Railway (Joint)	Ilkley to Arthington, via Otley and Pool-in-Wharfedale	5 July 1965 (to both passengers and all traffic)	Still extant as the Wharfedale line between Ilkley and Milnerwood Junction. Trackbed to become the Wharfedale Greenway cycle route.
Over and Wharton branch line	LNWR	Winsford Junction to Wharton	16 June 1947 (to passengers); 1992 (to all traffic)	
Oxenhope branch line	Midland Railway (LMS)	Keighley to Oxenhope via Ingrow, Damems, Oakworth and Haworth	1962; Re-opened in 1968	The Entire branch line is now preserved, as the Keighley & Worth Valley Railway.
Oxford, Worcester and Wolverhampton Railway		Oxford to Wolverhampton via Worcester	30 July 1962	Section from Stourbridge to Oxford remains open
Oxford to Cambridge line(Varsity Line)			1 January 1968 (passengers) 1993	Section from Bedford to Bletchley still open (as the Marston Vale line) Section from Oxford to Bicester reopened in 1987. Bicester to Bletchley section to be reopened (under construction as of 2025) as East West Rail. Extension from Bedford to Cambridge planned.
Palace Gates Line	GER	Palace Gates to Seven Sisters	7 January 1963	
Peterborough to Northampton line	LMS	Northampton to Peterborough (East)	1968 (to passengers); 1972 (to all traffic)	A 7 1/2-mile stretch of the line now preserved as the Nene Valley Railway.
Pickle Bridge Line	Lancashire and Yorkshire Railway (LMS)	Cooper Bridge to Norwood Green, via Bailiff Bridge	1934 (to passengers); 1952 (to all traffic)	
Picton–Battersby line	North Yorkshire and Cleveland Railway	Picton to Battersby	14 June 1954 (to passengers); August 1965 (to all traffic)	
Pilmoor, Boroughbridge and Knaresborough Railway	North Eastern Railway	Knaresborough to Pilmoor, via Boroughbridge	1950 (to passengers); 1964 (to all traffic)	
Plymouth to Yealmpton Branch	GWR	Plymouth to Yealmpton	6 October 1947 (to passengers); 29 February 1960 (to all traffic)	
Ponteland and Darras Hall branch lines	North Eastern Railway (LNER)	South Gosforth to Ponteland and Darras Hall, via Kenton Bank	17 June 1929 (to passengers); 2 August 1954 (to all traffic, west of Ponteland); 14 August 1967 (to goods); 6 March 1989 (to all traffic)	Most of the line was reopened as part of the Tyne and Wear Metro, initially to Bank Foot (replacing the original Kenton Bank station) in 1981 and then, via a short branch from the original route, to Airport on 17 November 1991
Pontop and Jarrow Railway	Stockton and Darlington Railway (George Stephenson & Co)	Jarrow Staith to Dipton Colliery, via Springwell	4 October 1974 (to most traffic); 10 January 1986 (to all traffic)	Primarily cable-hauled, this line almost exclusively served as a colliery railway. A short stretch of the line based at the site of Springwell Colliery is now preserved as the Bowes Railway.
Poplar Branch	NLR	Victoria Park to Poplar	15 May 1944 (to passengers); 3 October 1983 (to all traffic)	Partially reopened as part of the Docklands Light Railway
Portishead Railway		Portishead to Bristol	1964	To be reopened December 2024
Portland Branch Railway		Weymouth to Isle of Portland	1952 (to passengers); 1965 (to all traffic)	
Potteries Loop Line			2 March 1964	
Preston–Longridge branch line	P&LR	Preston to Longridge	1930	Opened 1840 as horse-drawn tramway; converted to steam 1848. Most of track removed in 1967. One mile of track in Preston remains, but disused.
Princes End branch line		Tipton to Wednesbury	1916 (to passengers); April 1981 (to all traffic)	
Pudsey loop railway	GNR	Bramley to Laisterdyke via Pudsey	15 June 1964	
Queensbury lines	Great Northern Railway/ Lancashire & Yorkshire Railway	Bradford to Halifax, Halifax to Keighley, & Keighley to Bradford, via Queensbury	1955 (to passengers); 1960–5 (to freight)/in-stages 1972–4 (to all traffic)	Part of the route between Cullingworth and Queensbury has been reused as part of the Great Northern Railway Trail
Ramsey Railway	Great Northern Railway	Holme to Ramsey	6 October 1947 (to passengers); December 1973 (to all traffic)	
Ramsgate Town branch line	South Eastern & Chatham Railway (SR)		1926	
Redheugh branch	Newcastle and Carlisle Railway	Blaydon to Redheugh		
Ringwood line	Southampton and Dorchester Railway	Hamworthy to Brockenhurst	1977	The section between Hamworthy and Wimborne was closed in 1966, and the section between Wimborne and Brockenhurst between 1974 and 1977.
Ringwood, Christchurch and Bournemouth Railway		Ringwood to Bournemouth	30 September 1935	Closed between Ringwood and Christchurch. Remaining section part of SWML
Ripley branch line	Midland Railway (LMS)	Derby to Langley Mill, via Ripley	1930 (to passengers); 1957-68 (to regular traffic); 1999 (to all traffic)	
Rishworth branch	Lancashire & Yorkshire Rly	Sowerby Bridge to Rishworth	1929 (to passengers); 19?? (to all traffic)	
Riverside Branch	North Eastern Railway (LNER)	Manors to Percy Main, via St. Peters, Walker and Carville	31 October 1966 (to goods); 23 July 1973 (to passengers); 31 March 1988 (to all traffic)	Following withdrawal of passenger services in 1973, line was progressively abandoned from east to west. On 31 May 1978 the section east of Carville closed, followed by that east of St. Peters in April 1987.
Rochdale–Bacup line	Lancashire & Yorkshire Railway	Rochdale to Bacup, via Whitworth and Shawforth	1967	
Rolleston Junction–Mansfield line	MR	Rolleston Junction to Mansfield via Southwell	12 August 1929 (to passengers between Mansfield and Southwell) 16 June 1959 (to passengers between Southwell and Rolleston Junction) 17 October 1983 (to all traffic)	
Romney Marsh branch line		Appledore Junction to New Romney, via Lydd Town and Lydd-on-Sea	1937 (to passengers); 1967 (to freight)	Branch from Marshlink line at Appledore, Kent to Dungeness and New Romney, Part of the line is still used for freight to Dungeness Nuclear Power Station
Rosedale Railway		Battersby to Rosedale mines	11 June 1929	
Rothbury Branch	Northumberland Central Railway/ North British Railway (LNER)	Scotsgap to Rothbury, via Longwitton, Ewesley, Fontburn Halt and Brinkburn	15 September 1952 (to passengers); 11 November 1963 (to goods)	
Rugby to Peterborough line	Midland Railway (LMS)	Rugby to Peterborough (East)	6 June 1966	
"Rye Harbour Branch"			1962	Branch from Marshlink line at Rye railway station to the town distant Harbour (1854 to 1962)
Ryedale line		Pickering to Pilmoor, via Kirkbymoorside, Helmsley and Gilling	1965	
St Helens and Runcorn Gap Railway			16 June 1951	
Saffron Walden Railway		Audley End to Bartlow	December 1964	
Salisbury and Dorset Junction Railway			2 May 1964	
Sandgate branch line	South Eastern Railway (England)	Ashford International, Sandling to Sandgate	1951 (Closed)	Now a public footpath, no original track remaining.
Scarborough to Pickering line	North Eastern Railway (LNER)	Seamer to Pickering, via Forge Valley, Wykeham and Thornton-le-Dale	1953 (to passengers); 1963 (to all traffic)	Known as the Forge Valley line
Scarborough to Whitby branch line	North Eastern Railway (LNER)	Scarborough to Whitby, (via Cloughton, Stainton Dale, Ravenscar and Robin Hood's Bay)	22 March 1965 (to regular traffic); 31 October 1967 (to all traffic)	Now a combined cycle/footpath route
Scotswood branch	Newcastle and Carlisle Railway	Newcastle to Blaydon via Scotswood	4 October 1982	Original alignment of the N&CR
Scotswood, Newburn and Wylam Railway		Scotswood to Wylam	11 March 1968	
Seaton branch line	LSWR (Southern Railway)	Seaton Junction to Seaton via Colyton and Colyford	7 March 1966 (to all traffic)	A stretch of the former branch, re-laid as the Seaton Tramway.
Selby–Driffield line	North Eastern Railway (LNER)	Selby to Driffield, via Market Weighton	20 September 1954 (to passengers); 30 June 1965 (to all traffic)	
Selby–Goole line	North Eastern Railway (LNER)	Selby to Goole, via Drax	15 June 1964	
Severn and Wye Railway	GWR	Lydney to Lydbrook, (via Whitecroft, Parkend, Speech House Road and Serridge Junction)	1977	4 1/2-mile stretch of the S&WR, now preserved as the Dean Forest Railway.
Severn Valley Line	West Midland Railway; GWR	Shrewsbury to both Hartlebury and to Kidderminster	September 1963	A 16 1/2-mile stretch of the line now preserved as the Severn Valley Railway.
Sharpness branch line	Severn & Wye Railway (GWR)	Berkeley Road to Severn Bridge, via Sharpness	1964 (to passengers)	Most of the former branch line is now being restored as the Vale of Berkeley Railway.
Sheffield and Lincolnshire Junction Railway		Retford to Lincoln		
Sheppey Light Railway			4 December 1950	SECR branch off Sheerness line – 1901–1950 – Built under the Light Railways Act 1896.
Shipley Great Northern Railway branch line	GNR	Laisterdyke to Shipley	2 February 1931 (to passengers) 1968 (to all traffic)	
Shipston-on-Stour branch	GWR	Moreton-in-Marsh to Shipston-on-Stour	8 July 1929 (to passengers) 2 May 1960 (to goods)	
Shropshire and Montgomeryshire Railway		Shrewsbury to Llanymynech and Criggion	6 November 1933 (to passengers) 29 February 1960 (to all traffic)	
Shropshire Union Railways and Canal Company			September 1964	
Sidmouth line	London & South Western Rly (SR)	Exmouth to Feniton, via 'Budleigh Salterton', Sidmouth and Ottery St Mary	8 May 1967 (to all traffic)	
Skelmersdale branch	ELR	Ormskirk to Rainford Junction	1956	Opened 1858; goods service continued to 1963
Somerset & Dorset Joint Line	Merger of earlier railways	Bath to Broadstone, with branch from Evercreech Junction to Burnham-on-Sea and Bridgwater	6 March 1966	Opened 1862 as the result of the amalgamation of the Somerset Central Railway and the Dorset Central Railway. Original route ran from Burnham-on-Sea and Bridgwater to Broadstone, continuing over London and South Western lines to Poole and Bournemouth. In 1863 the line from Evercreech Junction to Bath was built. Railway was closed in 1966. A Trio of Three Stretches of the former line are now Preserved, The first (based at Midsomer Norton) is restored and run by the S&DR Heritage Trust, The second (based at Shillingstone) is also (currently under restoration) as the Heritage North Dorset Railway; And the third, (in-between) now forming the Gartell Light Railway.
Southport and Cheshire Lines Extension Railway	SCLER	Southport to Aintree	1952	Opened 1884. Tracks lifted 1860. Almost all of the route is now a cycle path.
Southwold Railway		Halesworth to Southwold	11 April 1929	
South Devon and Tavistock Railway	GWR	Plymouth to Launceston (via Tavistock)	1962	A 1 1/2-mile stretch of the line now preserved as the Plym Valley Railway.
South Durham and Lancashire Union Railway	South Durham and Lancashire Union Railway/ Stockton and Darlington Railway (LNER)	Tebay to Bishop Auckland, via Kirkby Stephen East, Barras, Barnard Castle and West Auckland	22 January 1962 (to passengers, west of Barnard Castle, and all traffic between Hartley Quarry and Barnard Castle); 18 June 1962 (to passengers, east of Barnard Castle); December 1963 (to all traffic, west of Kirkby Stephen East); October 1974 (to all remaining traffic)	A short stretch of the line at Kirkby Stephen East station is preserved as the Stainmore Railway Centre.
South Shields, Marsden, and Whitburn Colliery Railway	South Shields, Marsden, and Whitburn Colliery Railway (NCB)	Westoe Lane to Whitburn Colliery	23 November 1953 (to passengers); 8 June 1968 (to all traffic)	Though built as a colliery line, it also carried a public passenger service between 19 March 1888 and 23 November 1953. Because the line was operated by the Whitburn (and later Harton) Coal Companies, it became the first passenger line in Great Britain to be nationalised due to the nationalisation of the coal industry on 1 January 1947 preceding that of the railways by 1 year.
South Shields to Stanhope and Wear Valley Junction lines	Stanhope and Tyne Railway/ Stockton and Darlington Railway/ NER (LNER)	South Shields/Tyne Dock to Rowley via Chichester, Boldon, Washington, Annfield Plain and Consett. Beyond Rowley, line split between original route to Stanhope and Rookhope via Waskerley and NER-built deviation to Wear Valley Junction via Tow Law and Crook.	8 March 1965 (to passengers); 1984 (to all traffic, west of Brockley Whins)	Complex history of passenger services commencing and being withdrawn throughout the 19th Century. A more permanent passenger service was introduced by the Stockton & Darlington Railway between Consett and Wear Valley Junction on 4 July 1859 but was progressively withdrawn north of Tow Law on 1 May 1939, north of Crook on 11 June 1956 and entirely on 8 March 1965. This section closed to all traffic in March 1969. The North Eastern Railway introduced a Blackhill (on the Derwent Valley Railway) and Consett to Birtley (on the ECML service on 1 February 1894. Passenger traffic on this section ended on 23 May 1955 but mineral traffic remained until 1984. The Brockley Whins to Tyne Dock section remains as a freight line while part of the line through South Shields was reused for the Tyne and Wear Metro.
South Staffordshire line	South Staffordshire Railway	Stourbridge to Walsall	19 March 1993	Section between Wednesbury and Brierley Hill being reopened as part of Midland Metro with an estimated opening date of 2027. Stourbridge to Brierley Hill open for freight. Remainder mostly intact but overgrown.
South Yorkshire Joint Railway			2 December 1929 (to passengers)	
South Yorkshire Junction Railway		Wrangbrook Junction to Denaby	7 August 1967	
South Yorkshire lines	South Yorkshire Railway (LNER)	Swinton Junction–Doncaster; Doncaster–Barnsley; Wombwell–Sheffield		A part of the SYR Elsecar Colliery line had been preserved as the Elsecar Heritage Railway of whom currently mothballed.
Spen Valley line	Lancashire & Yorkshire Rly (LMS)	Low Moor to Mirfield, via Cleckheaton, Liversedge and Heckmondwike	14 June 1965 (to passengers); 31 May 1969 (to all traffic)	Most of the Line, now converted to a Greenway cycle/path
Spilsby branch line	Great Northern Rly	Firsby to Spilsby	1939 (to passengers); 1958 (to all traffic)	
Sprat and Winkle Line	LSWR	Andover to Redbridge	1967	
Stafford and Uttoxeter Railway			4 December 1939 (passenger), 5 March 1951 (through access)	
Staines West branch line	Great Western Railway (GWR)	West Drayton to Staines (West)	1961–5 (to passengers); 1981 (to freight)	The line is still extant, but only as far as Colnbrook, (but disused)
Stainland branch	L&YR	Greetland to Stainland	1929 (to passengers) 1959 (to all traffic)	
Stamford and Essendine Railway		Essendine to Wansford via Stamford	Stamford to Wansford closed to all traffic 29 June 1929 Essendine to Stamford closed to passengers 15 June 1959, freight 4 March 1963	
Stanhope and Tyne Railway		Stanhope to South Shields	23 May 1955 (to passengers)	
Stanmore branch line	London and North Western Railway (LNWR)	Harrow to Stanmore	5 October 1964	
Stockport, Timperley and Altrincham Junction Railway		Stockport Portwood to Altrincham	1967 (to passengers)	Portions remain in service for freight and as part of Manchester Metrolink
Stockport and Woodley Junction Railway		Stockport Portwood to Woodley		
Stockton and Darlington Railway		Albert Hill Junction to Oak Tree Junction	1 July 1887 (to passengers) 1967 (to all traffic)	Rest of the line remains in service as the Tees Valley line
Stoke-on-Trent to Market Drayton line	North Staffordshire Railway (LMS)	Stoke-on-Trent to Market Drayton via, Newcastle-under-Lyme, Silverdale and Pipe Gate	1964 (to passengers); 1966/67 (to freight); 1998 (to all traffic)	Most of the former line, still in existence, but completely disused
Stoke-on-Trent to Leek line	North Staffordshire Railway (LMS)	Stoke-on-Trent to Leek	1956 (to passengers); 1988 (to freight); 1994 (to all traffic)	Could one day be restored/re-opened (to put Leek back on the national network). A third-of-a-mile-long stretch of the line west of leekbrook junction (currently as far as just before Wall Grange) resurrected as part of the Churnet Valley Railway coinciding with future heritage open days.
Stonebridge Railway	BDJR	Hampton to Whitacre Junction	1935	First Main-line to be singled in 1840
Stonehouse and Nailsworth Railway	Midland Railway	Stonehouse to Nailsworth	1947 (to passengers) 1966 (to all traffic)	
Stour Valley Railway		Shelford to Marks Tey	6 March 1967	Eastern end remains open as the Gainsborough line
Southsea Railway			August 1914	
Steyning Line	LB&SCR	Horsham to Shoreham-by-Sea	7 March 1966	Trackbed is now part of Downs Link footpath
Stratford-upon-Avon and Midland Junction Railway	Midland Railway	Broom Junction to Bedford, via Fenny Compton and Towcester	7 April 1952 (to passengers); 3 February 1964 (to all traffic)	
Sunderland–Penshaw line	YN&BR (LNER)	Sunderland to Penshaw, via Pallion, Hylton and Cox Green	4 May 1964 (to passengers); 21 August 1967 (to all traffic, west of Hylton); 20 November 1976 (to all traffic, west of Pallion); 27 November 1984 (to all traffic, east of Pallion)	Most of the line was reopened as part of 2002 South Hylton extension of the Tyne and Wear Metro, although a slight deviation from the original course was required at Pallion
Sutton Park line	Midland Railway	Water Orton to Walsall	18 January 1965 (to passengers)	Remains open for freight
Tanfield Lea Colliery branch line	Built in 1725	Gateshead Junction to Tanfield Lea Colliery	1962–70 (to all traffic, in stages)	Built as a wooden-wagonway/colliery line. A stretch of the former colliery line is now preserved as the Tanfield Railway.
LBSCR link between Oxted line and SER's Hastings line at Tunbridge Wells			1985	
Teign Valley line		Heathfield to Exeter	June 1958 (to passengers) 1967 (to all traffic)	
Tenbury and Bewdley Railway	Great Western Rly	Bewdley to Wooferton, via Tenbury	1962 (to passengers) 1965 (to freight)	Part of the line through the Wyre Forest is now a cyclepath. Bewdley station is now on the Severn Valley Railway.
Teston Crossing Halt line	South Eastern and Chatham Railway	Teston and West Farleigh	1959 (closed)	Was situated on what is now the Medway Valley Line.
Tetbury branch line	Great Western Railway	Kemble to Tetbury, via Rodmarton and Culkerton	6 April 1964	
Tewkesbury line	Midland Railway (LMS/GWR)	Great Malvern to Ashchurch, via Tewksbury	1961 (to passengers); 1963 (to freight)	
Thetford to Bury St Edmunds line	GER	Bury St Edmunds to Thetford	8 June 1953 (to passengers); 27 June 1960 (to all traffic)	
Thetford to Swaffham branch line	Great Eastern Railway (LNER)	Thetford to Swaffham, via Watton and Roudham Junction	15 June 1964	
Thirsk and Malton line	YN&BR	Thirsk to Malton via Gilling	1965	
Three Bridges–Tunbridge Wells line		Three Bridges to Tunbridge Wells	1 January 1967	
Totnes–Ashburton branch line	BT&SDR (GWR)	Totnes to Ashburton (via Staverton and Buckfastleigh)	1958 (to passengers); 1962 (to goods)	A 7-mile stretch of the branch line now preserved as the South Devon Railway.
Truro and Newquay Railway	GWR	Truro to Newquay	1963	
Tunbridge Wells to Eridge Line	LB&SCR/SR	Eridge to Tunbridge Wells (via Groombridge)	6 July 1985	5-mile stretch of track now restored as the Spa Valley Railway.
Turnchapel Branch	LSWR	Plymouth to Turnchapel	10 September 1951 (to passengers) 30 October 1961 (to goods)	
Tweedmouth to Kelso line	YN&BR (LNER)	Tweedmouth to Kelso, via Norham, Coldstream and Sunilaws	15 June 1964 (to passengers); 29 March 1965 (to all traffic)	A cross-border line which made an end-on connection with the North British Railway's line to St Boswells at Kelso
Ulverston–Lakeside branch line	Furness Railway (LMS)	Ulverston to Lakeside (via Greenodd and Haverthwaite)	6 September 1965	A 3 1/2-mile stretch of the branch line now preserved as the Lakeside & Haverthwaite Railway.
Uffington–Faringdon branch line	Great Western Rly	Uffington to Faringdon	1951	
Uppingham branch line	London & North Western Rly	Seaton (Rutland) to Uppingham	1960	Opened 1894
Uxbridge branch line	Great Western Railway	West Drayton to Uxbridge Vine Street	10 September 1962 (to passengers) 13 July 1964 (to all traffic)	
Victoria Dock branch line		Y&NMR to Victoria Dock	1964 (to passengers) 1968 (to all traffic)	
Wallingford branch line	Great Western Railway	Cholsey to Wallingford	1969 (to passengers); 1981 (to all traffic)	Mostof the entire branch line now preserved as the Cholsey & Wallingford Railway (aka, The Bunk Line).
Warrington and Altrincham Junction Railway		Warrington to Timperley Junction	10 September 1962 (to passengers) 7 July 1985 (to all traffic)	
Watlington branch line	Great Western Railway	Princes Risborough to Watlington, via Chinnor and Aston Rowant	1957 (to passengers); 1989 (to all traffic)	A 4-mile stretch of the branch line now preserved as the Chinnor & Princes Risborough Railway. The rest of the former branch towards Watlington (via Aston Rowant) still extant.
Wansbeck Valley line	Wansbeck Railway/ NBR (LNER)	Morpeth to Reedsmouth, via Scotsgap	15 September 1952 (to passengers); 3 October 1966 (to all traffic)	
Wantage Tramway		Wantage to Wantage Road	1 August 1925 (to passengers) 22 December 1945 (to all traffic)	
Wareham–Swanage branch line	LSWR	Wareham to Swanage (via Corfe Castle)	3 January 1972	Most of the entire branch line now preserved as the Swanage Railway (aka, The Purbeck Line).
Watford and Rickmansworth Railway			1952	
Waveney Valley line	Great Eastern Railway	Tivetshall to Beccles	19 April 1966	Passenger services withdrawn 3 January 1953
Wealden Line	LB&SCR	Lewes to South Croydon, via Uckfield, Eridge and Hurst Green	23 February 1969 (to all traffic)	The line northwards, and as far south as) Uckfield (to South Croydon, via Eridge and Hurst Green) remains open. Part of the line (between Isfield and Little Horsted) now preserved as the Lavender Line.
Wearhead branch line	Bishop Auckland & Weardale Railway/ Frosterley & Stanhope Railway/ Stockton & Darlington Railway/ NER (LNER)	Bishop Auckland to Wearhead (via Wear Valley Junction, Frosterley and Stanhope)	1953 (to passengers); 1993 (to all traffic)	The line east of Eastgate is now preserved as the Weardale Railway.
Weedon–Marton Junction line	LNWR	Weedon Bec to Marton Junction.	1963	Opened 1888-95
Wellington–Craven Arms line	GWR (formation of three earlier companies)	Wellington to Craven Arms via Horsehay & Dawley, Lightmoor Junction, Buildwas, Much Wenlock and Rushbury	1964 (to passengers); 19?? (to all traffic)	A stretch of the line now restored as the Telford Steam Railway.
Wellington to Market Drayton line		Market Drayton to Wellington, via Peplow and Crudgington	1963 (to passengers); 1967 (to freight)	
Wellington to Stafford Line	SUR&CC	Stafford to Wellington via Newport	7 September 1964 (to passengers) 22 November 1969 (to all traffic)	
West Croydon to Wimbledon Line		West Croydon to Wimbledon via Mitcham Junction	31 May 1997	Only bits of the line remain. The Croydon Tramlink now runs within its place. This line in the last few years of service ran Class 456s in Network South East livery.
West Lancashire line	WLR	Preston to Southport	1964	
West Norfolk line	Great Eastern Railway (LNER)	Heacham to Wells-next-the-Sea, via Burnham Market	31 May 1952 (to passengers); 1954 (to all traffic)	
Westerham Valley branch line	SER	Dunton Green to Westerham	1961	off SER Main Line, see Westerham and Brasted
Weston, Clevedon and Portishead Railway				
Weymouth Harbour Tramway			1999 (to all traffic)	
Whitby and Pickering Railway	NER	Malton to Whitby (via Marishes Road, Pickering, Grosmont and Sleights)	22 March 1965	An 18 mile-long stretch of the line now preserved as the North Yorkshire Moors Railway.
Whitby, Redcar and Middlesbrough Union Railway		Middlesbrough to Whitby, via Redcar, Salturn-by-the-Sea, Loftus, Staithes, Kettlewell and Sandsend.	1958 (to passengers); 1961 (to goods)	Part of the line (between Saltburn and Boulby near Staithes) still open (freight only), Resurrected in 1974 to serve the nearby Boulby Potash Mine.
Whitchurch and Tattenhall Railway	LNWR	Whitchurch to Chester	1957 (to passengers) January 1964 (to all traffic)	
Whitehaven, Cleator and Egremont Railway	LNWR/Furness Railway		1954 (to regular traffic); 1964 (to all traffic)	
Wigan Junction Railways		Glazebrook to Wigan	1964 (to passengers)	
Winchester to Brookwood line	LSWR (Alton, Alresford and Winchester Railway)	Winchester to Brookwood (via Itchen Abbas, Alresford, Ropley, Alton and Farnham)	5 February 1973	A 10-mile stretch of the line now preserved as the Mid Hants Railway (aka, The Watercress Line). Whilst the rest of the line, (north of Alton) is now the present day local-commuter Alton Line, respectively.
Wirksworth branch	Midland Railway	Duffield to Wirksworth	16 June 1947 (to passengers) 4 December 1989 (to goods)	This entire branch line is now preserved as the Ecclesbourne Valley Railway
Wisbech branch line	GER	March to Watlington (via Wisbech East)	1968 (to passengers); 2001 (to all traffic)	South of Wisbech, much of the former branch still extant. The line has been proposed for reopening (south of Wisbech), both as the heritage Bramley Line and as a National Rail commuter line.
Witham to Maldon branch line	Maldon, Witham & Braintree Railway	Witham to Maldon	1966	
Wolverhampton and Walsall Railway	Midland Railway	Wolverhampton to Walsall	5 January 1931	
Wolverton–Newport Pagnell line		Wolverton to Newport Pagnell	5 September 1964 (to passengers) 1967 (to all traffic)	
Wombourne branch line		Oxley Junction to Brettell Lane	1932 (to passengers) 25 June 1965 (to goods)	Mostly remains open as a footpath. Track and remains of platforms remain in situ but overgrown between Pensnett and Brettell Lane. (No public right of way).
Woodford–Ongar tube line	Central London Railway/ Eastern Counties Railway (LNER)	Woodford to Ongar via Buckhurst Hill, Loughton, Debden, Theydon Bois and Epping	1994 (Ongar section, only)	Woodford to Epping section of the line still open (as part of the London Underground's) Central line service, Whilst the section beyond is now preserved as the Epping Ongar Railway.
Woodhead line		Manchester Piccadilly to Sheffield Victoria/Wath marshalling yard, via Hadfield and Penistone	5 January 1970 (to passengers, east of Hadfield); 1981 (to all traffic, Hadfield—Deepcar)	The line east of Hadfield (including the Glossop branch), as well as short section at Penistone, continue to be used by passenger services as parts of the Glossop and Penistone lines. A further section of line remained open to freight traffic from Stocksbridge steel works, near Deepcar, to Nunnery Junction (where it meets the Sheffield–Lincoln line) until 29 September 2024 when the line was mothballed.. Proposals have been made to reintroduce passenger services to south of Deepcar as well as, to a lesser extent, the rest of the line.
Woodside and South Croydon Railway	LBSCR	Sanderstead to Elmers End	1983	Also known as the "Back Garden Railway";
Worcester, Bromyard and Leominster Railway		Worcester to Leominster via Bromyard	1965	
Wroxham–County School Line	Great Eastern Railway (LNER)	Wroxham to County School	1952/64 (to passengers); 1981 (to freight); 1982/3 (to all traffic)	9 mile stretch of the line, now re-laid as the 15 in (381 mm) gauge Bure Valley Railway. Known (throughout its heyday) as the east norfolk line.
Wycombe Railway		Maidenhead to Oxford via High Wycombe		
Wymondham to Forncett line	Great Eastern Railway	Wymondham to Forncett	4 August 1951	
Wymondham to Wells Branch	Great Eastern Railway (LNER)	Wymondham to Wells-next-the-Sea (via Thuxton, Dereham, Fakenham East and Walsingham	5 October 1964 (to regular passengers); 6 October 1969 (to all passengers); 12 September 1984 (to coal traffic); 1989 (to all traffic)	The 10 1/4 in (260 mm) gauge Wells and Walsingham Light Railway has reopened 4 miles (6.4 km) of line between resited termini at Wells and Walsingham. The Mid Norfolk Railway has reopened the line south of Dereham and is actively working to preserve all 17.5 miles (28.2 km) of the line south of County School. The MNR has long-term ambitions of restoring the line between County School and Fakenham.
Yarmouth–Beccles line	Great Eastern Railway	Beccles to Great Yarmouth, via Haddiscoe	2 November 1959	
Yarmouth–Lowestoft line	Great Eastern Railway	Lowestoft to Great Yarmouth, via Hopton-on-Sea and Gorleston-on-Sea	13 July 1964; 4 May 1970 (to all traffic, officially)	
Yate-Thornbury branch line	Midland Railway (LMS)	Yate to Thornbury, via Tytherington	19 June 1944 (to passengers); 2013 (to all traffic)	
Yeadon branch line	Midland Railway (LMS)	Guiseley to Yeadon	7 August 1964	Mainly a Goods-only branch throughout its existing heyday
Yeovil–Taunton line	Bristol & Exeter Rly (GWR)	Taunton to Yeovil, via Athelney, Langport and Martlock	1964 (to all traffic)	
York and Doncaster branch	North Eastern Railway	York to Selby via Riccall	3 October 1983	
York–Beverley line	North Eastern Railway	York to Beverley (via Kiplingcotes, Market Weighton, Pocklington and Stamford Bridge)	27 November 1965 (to all traffic)	A group, the Minsters' Rail Campaign, was established in 2001 to promote the re-opening of the line and following the Government's plans announced in 2017 to reinstate lines closed in the 1960s, it has been proposed that the line could reopen. In June 2020, the East Riding of Yorkshire Council submitted a request for funding to cover a feasibility study to investigate reopening the line.

== Northern Ireland ==
Name of line	Builder	Route (from/to)	Closure date	Notes
Belfast and County Down Railway		Belfast to Newcastle via Comber and Downpatrick; Comber to Donaghadee via Newtownards; Ballynahinch Junction to Ballynahinch; Downpatrick to Ardglass	1950	Part of the B&CDR, now preserved as the Downpatrick and County Down Railway
Dundalk, Newry and Greenore Railway	London and North Western Railway (LMS)	Dundalk to Newry	1951	
Portadown, Dungannon and Omagh Junction Railway	Great Northern Railway of Ireland	Portadown to Omagh	1965	
Ulster Railway	Great Northern Railway of Ireland	Portadown to Cavan	1959	

== Scotland ==
See also Template:Historical Scottish railway companies

Name of line	Builder	Route (from/to)	Closure date	Notes
Aberdeen Railway	Caledonian Railway (LMS)	Kinnaber Junction to Brechin, via Dubton	1952–67 (to passengers); 1981 (to all traffic)	A 4 mile stretch of the line now preserved, as the Caledonian Railway (Brechin).
Aberfeldy branch line	Highland Railway (LMS)	Aberfeldy Junction to Aberfeldy, via Grandtully	3 May 1965 (to all traffic)	
Aberlady, Gullane and North Berwick Railway		Longniddry to Gullane	12 September 1932 (to passengers); 15 June 1964 (to all traffic)	Planned route from Gullane to North Berwick never opened
Alford Valley branch line	Great North of Scotland Railway (LNER)	Kintore to Alford, via Tillyfourie	1950 (to passengers); 1966 (to all traffic)	A stretch of the former line (at Alford) now preserved as the Alford Valley Railway
Alloa Railway		Airth to Alloa	29 January 1968 (to passengers); 6 May 1968 (to all traffic)	
Alva Railway		Cambus to Alva	1 November 1954 (to passengers); January 1965 (to all traffic)	
Alyth Branch Line	Caledonian Railway (LMS)	Alyth Junction to Alyth (itself), via Meigle and Jordanstone	2 July 1951 (to passenger traffic); January 1965 (to all traffic)	
Arbroath and Forfar Railway	Caledonian Railway (LMS)	Arbroath to Forfa	1967	
Ayr and Cumnock Line	G&SWR	Ayr to Cumnock via Annbank	10 September 1951	Section between Ayr and Drongan remains in service for freight
Ayr and Dalmellington Railway		Ayr to Dalmellington	6 April 1964 (to passengers)	Section between Ayr and Dalrymple Junction in service as part of the Glasgow South Western Line. Section between Dalrymple Junction and Waterside remains in freight service
Ayr to Mauchline Branch	G&SWR	Ayr to Mauchline via Annbank	4 January 1943 (to passengers)	Remains in freight service
Balerno line		Ravelrig to Slateford via Balerno	30 October 1943 (to passengers); 4 December 1967 (to all traffic)	
Ballachulish branch line	Callander and Oban Railway	Connel Ferry to Ballachulish	28 March 1966	The Connel Bridge over Loch Etive is now used by the A828 road
Ballater branch line	GNoSR	Aberdeen to Ballater	18 July 1966	A stretch of the former branch line now preserved as the Royal Deeside Railway.
Ballochney Railway			1964	
Banff, Portsoy and Strathisla Railway	GNoSR	Cairnie Junction to Banff, via Tillynaught	6 July 1964 (to passenger traffic); 6 May 1968 (to all traffic)	
Banff, Macduff and Turriff Junction Railway	Great North of Scotland Railway (LNER)	Inveramsay to Macduff, via Turriff and Banff Bridge	1 October 1951 (to passengers); 3 January 1966 (to all traffic)	
Bangour Railway		Uphall to Bangour	4 May 1921 (to passengers); 1 Aug 1921 (to all traffic)	
Bankfoot Railway	SMJR	Strathord to Bankfoot	13 April 1931 (to passengers); 7 September 1964 (to goods)	
Barrhead Branch	G&SWR	Barrhead Central to Potterhill	1 January 1917 (to passengers); 2 March 1970 (to all traffic)	
Bathgate Branch	Monkland Railways	Bathgate to Blackston Junction	1 May 1930 (to passengers); 1973 (to all traffic)	
Beith Branch	GB&KJR	Lugton to Beith	5 November 1962 (to passengers); 5 October 1964 (to all traffic)	Section between Lugton and Barrmill still extant, albeit disused and disconnected from the main line
Berwickshire Railway	North British Railway	Reston to St Boswell's via Duns	10 September 1951 (to passengers); 7 November 1966 (to all traffic)	
Blane Valley Railway		Killearn to Lennoxtown	1 October 1951 (to passengers); 28 September 1964 (to all traffic)	
Blantyre and East Kilbride Branch	Caledonian Railway	East Kilbride to Hunthill Junction	14 July 1924 (to passengers); 24 January 1966 (to all traffic)	
Boddam Branch	Great North of Scotland Rly	Ellon to Boddam	1932 (to passengers); 1945 (to freight); 1950 (to all traffic)	
Bonnybridge Canal Branch	Caledonian Railway	Greenhill to Bonnybridge	28 July 1930 (to passengers); 7 December 1964 (to all traffic)	
Border Union Railway	North British Railway (LNER)	Carlisle to Hawick, via Newcastleton and Riccarton	1969	Part of the Waverley Route in-between
Bothwell Branch	Caledonian Railway	Fallside to Bothwell	5 June 1950	
Brechin and Edzell District Railway		Brechin to Edzell	27 September 1938 (to passengers); 7 September 1964 (to all traffic)	
Bridge of Weir Railway		Johnstone to Bridge of Weir	10 January 1983 (to passengers)	
Bridgeton Branch	North British Railway	College to Bridgeton Central	5 November 1979 (to passengers); 1987 (to all traffic)	
Buckie and Portessie Branch	Highland Railway	Keith to Portessie	9 August 1915 (to passengers); 1 April 1944 (to goods)	
Cairn Valley Light Railway		Dumfries to Moniaive	1 May 1943 (to passengers); 4 July 1949 (to goods)	
Cairnryan Military Railway				
Callander and Oban Railway	Callander and Oban Railway (LMS)	Callander to Oban	27 September 1965	Section between Crianlarich and Oban is still open, accessed via the West Highland Railway.
Cambusnethan Branch	Caledonian Railway	Wishaw South Junction to Newmains	1 January 1917	
Campsie Branch	Edinburgh and Glasgow Railway	Lenzie to Lennoxtown	1964 (to passengers); 1966 (to all traffic)	
Carmyllie Railway		Elliot Junction to Carmyllie	2 December 1929 (to passengers); 19 May 1965 (to all traffic)	
Castle Douglas and Dumfries Railway	Glasgow and South Western Railway	Castle Douglas to Dumfries	14 June 1965	
Catrine Branch	G&SWR	Mauchline to Catrine	3 May 1943 (to passengers); 6 July 1964 (to all traffic)	
City of Glasgow Union Railway				Majority of the line is extant. Section between High Street East Junction and Springburn in passenger service as part of the North Clyde Line
Cleland, Morningside and Drumbowie Railway	Caledonian Railway	Cleland to Morningside	1 December 1930	
Corstophine Branch	North British Railway	Haymarket to Corstophine	1 January 1968	
Crieff and Comrie Railway	Caledonian Railway (LMS)	Crieff to Comrie	6 July 1964	
Crieff Junction Railway	Caledonian Railway (LMS)	Crieff Junction (Gleneagles) to Crieff	6 July 1964	
Crieff and Methven Junction Railway	Caledonian Railway (LMS)	Perth to Crieff	1 October 1951 (to passengers); 11 September 1967 (to all traffic)	
Cromarty and Dingwall Light Railway		Conon to Cromarty		Never completed
Dalkeith Branch	North British Railway	Smeaton to Hardengreen Junction	11 Nov 1934	
Dalry and North Johnstone Line	G&SWR	Dalry to Elderslie via Kilbarchan	27 June 1966 (to passengers); 19 December 1977 (to all traffic)	Also known as the Kilbarchan Loop Line
Darvel and Strathaven Railway		Darvel to Strathaven	11 September 1939	
Darvel Branch	G&SWR	Hurlford to Loudounhill	6 April 1964	
Deeside Railway		Aberdeen to Ballater	28 February 1966 (to passengers); 2 January 1967 (to all traffic)	
Denny Branch	Scottish Central Railway	Larbert Junction to Denny	28 July 1930	
Devon Valley line	North British Railway	Kinross to Alloa, via Tillicoultry	1964 (to passengers); 1973 (to all traffic)	
Dolphinton branch (Caledonian Railway)	Caledonian Railway	Carstairs to Dolphinton	4 June 1945	
Dolphinton branch (North British Railway)	North British Railway	Leadburn to Dolphinton	1 April 1933	
Dornoch Light Railway		The Mound to Dornoch	13 June 1960	
Douglas Branch	Caledonian Railway	Lanark to Happendon	5 October 1964	
Dumfries, Lochmaben and Lockerbie Railway	Caledonian Railway	Lockerbie to Dumfries	18 April 1966	
Dunblane, Doune and Callander Railway	Caledonian Railway (LMS)	Dunblane to Callander	1 November 1965	
Dundee and Forfar direct line	Caledonian Railway	Dundee to Forfar	10 January 1955 (to passengers); 9 October 1967 (to all traffic)	
Dundee and Newtyle Railway	Scottish Central Railway (LNER)	Dundee West Junction to Alyth Junction, via Lochee, Baldovan, Baldragon, Rosemill, Dronley, Balbeuchly, Auchterhouse, Newtyle, and Ardler Junction	1955 (to passenger traffic); 1967 (to all traffic)	Most of this Historic Scottish Railway, was certainly remote and quite circuitous en route.
Edinburgh and Dalkeith Railway		St Leonards, South Leith to Dalkeith, Musselburgh		Partially reopened as part of the Borders Railway
Edinburgh, Leith and Newhaven Railway				
Edinburgh, Loanhead and Roslin Railway	LNER		196?	
Edinburgh Suburban Line	Edinburgh Suburban and Southside Junction Railway		10 September 1962 (to passengers)	Line remains open to freight
Elvanfoot–Wanlockhead branch line	Caledonian Railway (LMS)	Elvanfoot to Wanlockhead (via Leadhills)	31 December 1938 (to passengers); 195? (to all traffic)	A stretch of the former branch line, now re-laid as the 2 ft (610 mm) gauge Leadhills & Wanlockhead Railway.
Eyemouth Railway		Burnmouth to Eyemouth	5 Feb 1962	
Fife and Kinross Railway		Kinross to Ladybank	15 June 1964	
Fife Coast Railway	Edinburgh & Glasgow Railway (LNER)	Thornton Junction to St Andrews, via Leven, Largo, Anstruther and Boarhills	5 October 1964 (to goods); 6 September 1965 (to passengers); 18 December 1966 (to all traffic)	Most of the FCR, now forms the Fife Coastal Path; Section of the FCR (Thornton Junction-Leven) still extant, though long since disused
Findhorn Railway		Kinloss to Findhorn	31 January 1869 (to passengers); 1880 (to goods)	
Fochabers Railway		Orbliston to Fochabers	14 September 1931 (to passengers); 28 March 1966 (to all traffic)	
Forfar and Brechin Railway		Forfar to Brechin	4 August 1952 (to passengers); 4 September 1967 (to all traffic)	
Formartine and Buchan Railway		Dyce to Fraserburgh and Peterhead	Fraserburgh branch: 4 October 1965 (to passengers), 6 October 1979 (to goods); Peterhead branch: 3 May 1965 (to passengers), 7 September 1970 (to goods)	
Fort George Branch	Highland Railway	Gollanfield to Fort George	5 April 1943 (to passengers); 11 August 1958 (to goods)	
Fortrose Branch	Highland Railway	Muir of Ord to Fortrose	1 October 1951 (to passengers); 13 Jun 1960 (to all traffic)	
Forth and Clyde Junction Railway		Stirling to Balloch	1 October 1934 (to passengers); 9 April 1965 (to all traffic)	
Fountainhall-Lauder Branch Line	LNER	Fountainhall to Lauder, via Oxton	1958	
Fraserburgh branch line	Great North of Scotland Railway (LNER)	Dyce to Fraserburgh, via Ellon and Maud Junction	1965 (to regular traffic); 6 October 1979 (to all traffic)	
Galashiels to Eskbank line	North British Railway (LNER)	Eskbank to Galashiels, (via Leadburn and Peebles)	1962 (to passengers); 1967 (to freight); 1971 (to all traffic)	
Galashiels–Selkirk branch line	North British Railway (LNER)	Galashiels to Selkirk	3 October 1966	
General Terminus and Glasgow Harbour Railway				
Glasgow and Renfrew District Railway	G&PJR	Cardonald to Renfrew	19 July 1926 (to passengers)	
Glasgow, Barrhead and Kilmarnock Joint Railway		Glasgow to Kilmarnock		Majority of the line still extant
Glasgow, Bothwell, Hamilton and Coatbridge Railway	North British Railway	Shettleston to Hamilton	1955 (to passengers); 1965 (to all traffic)	
Glasgow Central Railway		Newton to Maryhill		Sections between Carmyle and Glasgow Green, Stobcross and Maryhill closed. Remaining portions still extant and in passenger service
Glasgow, Paisley, Kilmarnock and Ayr Railway		Paisley to Ayr and Kilmarnock		Majority of the line still extant and in passenger service
Glenfarg Line	North British Railway	Mawcarse to Bridge of Earn	15 June 1964	
Govan Branch	G&PJR	Ibrox to Govan	9 May 1921 (to passengers)	Line remains partially extant as a test track for the Glasgow Subway
Grangemouth Railway		Falkirk to Grangemouth	29 January 1968 (to passengers)	Remains open for freight
Granton Branch	Caledonian Railway		1965	
Greenock and Ayrshire Railway	G&SWR	Bridge of Weir to Greenock	10 January 1983 (to passengers)	
Haddington line	North British Railway (LNER)	Longniddry to Haddington	5 December 1949 (to passengers); 30 March 1968 (to all traffic)	
Hamiltonhill Branch	Caledonian Railway	Balornock Junction to Hamiltonhill		
Hamilton and Strathaven Railway	Caledonian Railway	Hamilton to Strathaven		
Hopeman Branch			14 September 1931 (to passengers); 7 November 1966 (to goods)	
Inchture Branch	Dundee and Perth Railway	Inchture Station to Crossgates, Inchture	1916	Horse-drawn tramway
Invergarry and Fort Augustus Railway		Spean Bridge to Fort Augustus	1 December 1933 (to passengers); 31 December 1946 (to all traffic)	
Inverness and Perth Junction Railway	Highland Railway (LMS)	Perth to Inverness	18 October 1965	The line between Perth and Aviemore is still open as part of the National Network. Whilst a 10 mile stretch of the line is now preserved as the Strathspey Railway.
Inverury and Old Meldrum Junction Railway		Inverurie to Oldmeldrum	2 November 1931 (to passengers); 3 January 1966 (to all traffic)	
Jedburgh branch line	North British Railway (LNER)	Roxburgh Junction to Jedburgh, via Nisbet and Jedfoot	13 August 1948 (to passengers); 10 August 1964 (to all traffic)	
Keith and Dufftown Railway (GNoSR)	GNoSR	Keith to Elgin, (via Auchindachy, Dufftown and Craigellachie)	1968 (to passengers); 1984 (to freight); 24 March 1991 (to all traffic)	An 11 1/2 mile stretch of the line now restored as the Keith and Dufftown Railway.
Kelvin Valley Railway		Maryhill to Kilsyth	31 March 1951 (to passengers); 1966 (to all traffic)	
Killin Railway	Caledonian Railway (LMS)	Killin Junction to Killin (Loch Tay until 1939)	27 September 1965	
Kilsyth and Bonnybridge railway		Kilsyth to Bonnybridge	1 July 1935 (to passengers); 4 May 1964 (to passengers)	
Kincardine Line	North British Railway	Alloa to Dunfermline	7 July 1930	Line remains extant
Kinross-shire Railway		Kinross to Lumphinnans	22 September 1930 (to passengers); 12 July 1972 (to freight)	
Kirkcaldy District Railway			6 August 1962	
Kirkcudbright Railway		Castle Douglas to Kirkcudbright	3 May 1965	
Lanarkshire and Ayrshire Railway		Ardrossan to Newton	4 July 1932 (to passengers)	Section between Newton and Neilston remains in service as part of the Cathcart Circle Lines
Lanarkshire and Dumbartonshire Railway		Possil to Dumbarton		
Langholm Branch	NBR	Riddings Junction to Langholm	15 June 1964 (to passengers); 18 September 1967 (to all traffic)	
Lauder Light Railway		Fountainhall to Lauder	10 September 1932 (to passengers); 30 September 1958 (to all traffic)	
Leslie Railway		Markinch to Leslie		
Lesmahagow Railway	Caledonian Railway			
Lochearnhead, St Fillans and Comrie Railway	Caledonian Railway (LMS)	Comrie to Lochearnhead	1 October 1951	
Longridge to Bathgate Branch	E&GR	Longridge to Bathgate	10 August 1964	
Macmerry Branch	North British Railway (LNER)		196?	
Maidens and Dunure Railway		Ayr to Girvan via Maidens	2 March 1942 (to regular passengers)	
Moffat Railway		Beattock to Moffat	6 December 1954 (to passengers); 6 April 1964 (to goods)	
Monkland and Kirkintilloch Railway			2 April 1966	
Monkton and Annbank Branch	G&SWR	Monton to Annbank		
Montrose and Bervie Railway	Montrose to Bervie	Great North of Scotland Railway (LNER)	1951 (to passengers); 1966 (to all traffic)	
Moray Coast Railway	GNoSR	Portsoy to Lossie Junction	6 May 1968	
Morayshire Railway	Morayshire Railway (LNER)	Elgin to Lossiemouth and Elgin to Craigellachie	28 March 1966 (to passengers); 4 November 1968 (to all traffic)	
Muirkirk and Lesmahagow Junction Railway	Caledonian Railway	Alton Heights Junction to Poneil Junction	13 September 1954	
Muirkirk Branch (Caledonian Railway)	Caledonian Railway	Happendon to Muirkirk	5 October 1964	
Muirkirk Branch (GPK&AR)	GPK&AR	Auchinleck to Muirkirk	3 July 1950 (to passengers)	
Musselburgh Branch		Musselburgh	9 September 1964 (to passengers); 7 December 1970 (to all traffic)	
Newburgh and North Fife Railway		St Fort to Newburgh	10 February 1951 (to passengers); 10 October 1964 (to all traffic)	
Newport Railway, Scotland		Tay Bridge to Leuchars	5 May 1969	
Paisley and Barrhead District Railway		Paisley to Lyoncross via Barrhead	21 October 1984	
Paisley and Renfrew Railway		Paisley to Renfrew	5 Jun 1967 (to passengers); 1981 (to all traffic)	
Paisley Canal line	G&SWR	Glasgow to Elderslie via Paisley Canal	10 January 1983	Section between Shields Junction and Paisley Canal reopened 28 July 1990
Peebles Railway		Eskbank to Peebles	10 September 1962	
Perth, Almond Valley and Methven Railway	Caledonian Railway (LMS)	Perth to Methven via Methven Junction	1 October 1951 (to passengers); 11 September 1967 (to all traffic)	
Peterhead branch line	Great North of Scotland Railway	Dyce to Peterhead, via Ellon and Maud Junction	1965 (to passengers); 1970 (to freight)	
Portpatrick Railway		Castle Douglas to Portpatrick	12 June 1965	Section between Dunragit and Stranaer remains in service as part of the Glasgow South Western Line
Rutherglen and Coatbridge Railway	Caledonian Railway	Rutherglen to Airdrie via Whifflet	7 November 1966	Section between Rutherglen and Whifflet reopened 4 October 1993
Scottish Midland Junction Railway	Scottish North Eastern Railway (LMS)	Perth to Forfar, via Stanley Junction, Cargill, Coupar Angus, Meigle Junction and Kirriemuir Junction en route.	1967 (to all traffic)	Perth to Stanley Junction stretch of the line still exists, as part of the Highland Mainline.
Selkirk and Galashiels Railway		Selkirk to Galashiels	10 September 1951 (to passengers); 2 Nov 1964 (to goods)	
Solway Junction Railway		Brayton to Kirtlebridge	27 April 1931	
South Alloa Branch	Scottish Central Railway	Alloa Junction to South Alloa	1 October 1885 (to passengers); 1 September 1950 (to goods)	
Slamannan Railway		Causewayend to Arbuckle	1930 (to passengers); 1964 (to all traffic)	
Slamannan and Borrowstounness Railway		Causewayend to Bo'ness, via Birkhill	closed 196?	A 5 1/2 mile stretch of the branch line now preserved as the Bo'ness and Kinneil Railway.
South Queensferry Branch	North British Railway	South Queensferry to Ratho		
Spiersbridge Branch	GB&NDR	Kennishead to Spiersbridge	1 May 1849 (to passengers); 31 January 1960 (to goods)	
Stirling and Dunfermline Railway	North British Railway (LNER)	Stirling to Dunfermline via Alloa	5 October 1968 (to passengers); 1993 (to all traffic)	The section between Stirling and Alloa re-opened to passenger traffic in 2008.
St Boswells–Kelso line	North British Railway (LNER)	St Boswells to Kelso	1964 (to passengers); 1968 (to freight)	
Strathendrick and Aberfoyle Railway		Aberfoyle to Dumgoyne	1 October 1951 (to passengers); 5 October 1959 (to all traffic)	
Strathspey Railway	GNoSR (LNER)	Craigellachie to Boat of Garten	18 October 1965 (to passengers); 4 November 1968 (to freight); November 1971 (to all traffic)	Boat of Garten Station is now part of the Strathspey Railway.
Sutherland and Caithness Railway				
Symington, Biggar and Broughton Railway	Caledonian Railway	Symington to Peebles	1950 (to passengers); 1966 (to all traffic)	
The Switchback	Caledonian Railway	Strathclyde Junction to Balornock Junction		
Waverley Route	North British Railway (LNER)	Carlisle to Edinburgh via Scotch Dyke, Newcastleton, Whitrope, Hawick, Tweedbank, Galashiels and Eskbank	4 January 1969 (to passengers); 1971 (to all traffic)	Part of the line, now rebuilt and re-opened (between Edinburgh and Tweedbank), named the Borders Railway, as part of the National Network. Whilst the section of the line (in-between Whitrope and Riccarton Junction) now preserved (being restored in stages, by the Waverley Route Heritage Association) as a Heritage Railway.
Wemyss and Buckhaven Railway		Buckhaven to Thornton	9 January 1955 (to passengers); 31 May 1985 (to all traffic)	
Whiteinch Railway		Whiteinch to Jordanhill	2 April 1951 (to passengers); March 1965 (to goods)	
Wick and Lybster Railway		Wick to Lybster	1 April 1944	
Wigtownshire Railway		Newton Stewart to Whithorn and Garlieston	29 September 1950	
Wilsontown branch	Caledonian Railway	Auchengray to Wilsontown	10 September 1951 (to passengers); 4 May 1964 (to all traffic)	
Wilsontown, Morningside and Coltness Railway		Morningside to Longridge	1 May 1930 (to passengers); 1982 (to all traffic)	
Wishaw and Coltness Railway			1930	

== Wales ==
Name of line	Builder	Route (from/to)	Closure date	Notes
Aberayron branch line	GWR	Lampeter to Aberayron, via Blaenplwyf and "Felin Fach"	1951 (to passengers); 1973 (to all traffic)	
Anglesey Central Railway	London & North Western Rly (LMS)	Gaerwen to Amlwch, via Llanerchymedd	1993 (to all traffic)	
Bala and Festiniog Railway	Great Western Railway	Blaenau Ffestiniog to Bala, via Manod, Llan Ffestiniog and Trawsfynydd	1961 (to passengers); 1998 (to all traffic)	Most of the track, still intact between Blaenau Ffestiniog and Trawsfynydd (long since disused) This line is now being looked at with a proposal to restore said line as the proposed Heritage Bala & Ffestiniog Railway Heritage Trust.
Bangor and Carnarvon Railway		Menai Bridge to Caernarvon	1972 (to all traffic)	
Bethesda branch line	Great Western Rly	Bangor to Bethesda, via Felin Hen and Tregarth	1951 (to passengers); 1962 (to all traffic)	
Brecon to Hereford line	Hereford, Hay & Brecon Railway (LMS/GWR)	Brecon to Hereford via Hay-on-Wye	31 December 1962 (Severed as a through route from Talyllyn Junctions)	
Brecon and Merthyr Railway	Great Western Railway	Merthyr Tydfil to Brecon / Newport to Brecon (Through route fragmented)	31 December 1962 (to passengers from Newport or Merthyr); 4 May 1964 (to all traffic from Merthyr)	5 1/2 mile stretch of the line, now re-laid as the 2 ft gauge Brecon Mountain Railway.
Brynmawr and Blaenavon Railway	London & North Western Railway/GWR	Pontypool to Brynmawr (via Varteg, Blaenavon and Waunavon)	1941 (to passengers); 1980 (to all traffic)	A 2-mile stretch of this former railway, now restored as the Pontypool & Blaenavon Railway.
Brymbo branch line	Great Western Railway	Stansty Junction to Brymbo	1970 (to all traffic)	
Burry Port and Gwendraeth Valley Railway				
Carmarthen–Aberystwyth line	Great Western Railway	Aberystwyth to Carmarthen	1965 (to passengers); 1973 (to all traffic)	A 4 1/2 mile stretch of the line, now preserved as the Gwili Railway.
Carnarvonshire Railway				
Coleford, Monmouth, Usk and Pontypool Railway	CUMPR	Monmouth to Pontypool	12 October 1957	The line never reached Coleford as the GWR bought it. Passenger services were withdrawn in 1955.
Denbigh, Ruthin and Corwen Railway				
Mold and Denbigh Junction Railway				
Dyserth branch line	London & North Western Railway	Prestatyn to Dyserth	1973 (to all traffic)	
Ebbw Valley line	Great Western Railway	Cardiff Central to Ebbw Vale	Still Open	
Glyn Valley Tramway		Chirk to Glyn Ceiriog	July 1935	
Hay-on-Wye to Pontrilas line	Great Western Railway	Hay-on-Wye to Pontrilas, via Clifford, Dorstone and Abbeydore	1953 (to passengers); 1957 (to all traffic)	
Hereford, Hay and Brecon Railway	Great Western and Midland Railways	Brecon (Free Street) to Hereford (Barton), via Talyllyn Junction, Aberllynfi and Hay-on-Wye	1962 (to all traffic)	
Holywell branch line	London & North Western Railway	Holywell Junction to Holywell Town	1954-7 (in stages, to all traffic)	
Llandudno branch line	St George's Harbour & Rly Company (LMS)	Llandudno Junction to Llandudno, via Deganwy	Still open	
Llanelly and Mynydd Mawr Railway	Llanelly Railway & Dock Company (GWR)	Llanelly Docks to Swansea via Cynheidre, Tumble, Cross Hands, Ammanford and Pantyffynnon	1989 (to all traffic)	Most of this historic railway (of whom still intact) now being restored as the Llanelli and Mynydd Mawr Railway
Llanidloes and Newtown Railway	Cambrian Railways	Llanidloes to Newtown	30 December 1962	
Llantrisant & Taff Vale Junction Railway	Great Western Railway		1984 (to all traffic)	
Mawddwy Railway	Great Western Railway	Cemmes Road to Dinas Mawddwy, via Aberangell	1 July 1952 (to all traffic)	
Maerdy Branch	Great Western Railway	Porth Junction to Mardy Colliery, via Ynshir, Tylorstown and Ferndale.	13 June 1964 (to passenger traffic); June 1986 (to all traffic)	The Maerdy Heritage Railway, A Preservation Group aims to restore A 3 mile-long stretch of this branch line, as A heritage railway.
Merthyr, Tredegar and Abergavenny Railway	London & North Western Railway	Merthyr (High Street) to Abergavenny Junction	4 January 1958 (to regular traffic, under BR); 2 November 1959 (to goods traffic); 13 November 1961 (to freight traffic); 4 May 1964 (to all traffic)	
Mid-Wales Railway	Cambrian Railways	Llanidloes to Brecon	31 December 1962	
Mold and Denbigh Junction Railway	M&DJR Co		30 April 1962 (to passengers); 1968 (to freight); 1983-8 (to all traffic)	
Mold Railway		Mold to Chester	1962 (to passengers) 1983 (to all traffic)	
Monmouthshire Railway and Canal Company				
Moss Valley Branch	GWR	Moss Valley Junction to Moss Halt	1 January 1931 (to passengers) 18 August 1983 (to all traffic)	
Neath and Brecon Railway	Great Western Railway	Brecon to Neath	31 Dec 1962	Part of the line remains open from Swansea District Line via Jersey Marine South Junction to Onllwyn
Newcastle Emlyn branch line	GWR (Carmarthen and Cardigan Railway)	Pencader to Newcastle Emlyn, via Llandyssul and Henllan	1965 (to passengers); 1973 (to all traffic)	Part of the former branch line now re-laid as the narrow gauge Teifi Valley Railway.
Newport, Abergavenny and Hereford Railway	London & North Western Railway/GWR	Hereford to Quakers Yard, via Crumlin, Hengoed and Penallta Junction	9 June 1958 (to goods traffic)	
Newtown to Brecon Line	Mid-Wales Railway; GWR		31 Dec 1962 (Completely closed as a through route north of Talyllyn & Three Cocks Junctions)	
Ogmore and Llynvi Valley lines	Great Western Rly		1958 to passenger traffic	
Pontcysyllte Branch	GWR		1931 (to passengers) 1968 (to all traffic)	
Rhondda and Swansea Bay Railway	Great Western Railway	Swansea to Treherbert, via Aberavon Town and Blaengwynfi	1962 (to regular traffic); 1983 (to all traffic)	Part of the R&SBR still extant as part of the National Network, Whilst most of the majority of the latter, between Briton Ferry and Treherbert remains completely closed. The section of the line between Pontypridd and Treherbert also still open as the local-commuter Rhondda Line.
Ruabon–Barmouth line	Great Western Railway	Ruabon to Barmouth (via Llangollen, Glyndyfrydwy, Corwen, Llandderfel, Bala and Dolgellau)	1964–5 (to passengers); 1968 (to all traffic)	Two stretches (of the former line) now preserved, as the Llangollen Railway (between Corwen and Llangollen, via Carrog, Glyndyfrydwy and Berwyn), A total of 10 miles (16.1 km) in length, and the Bala Lake Railway (between Llanuwchllyn and Bala via Pentrepiod and Llangower), A total of 4 1/2 miles (7.2 km) in length.
Swansea and Mumbles Railway				
Swansea Vale Railway		Swansea to Abercrave, Brynamman	1965 (to passengers) 1983 (to all traffic)	
Talyllyn Railway	Cambrian Railways	Tywyn Wharf to Abergynolwyn	1950 (to passengers)	Re-opened as a heritage railway in 1951
Tanat Valley Light Railway	Cambrian Railways		15 September 1951 (to passengers) December 1960 (to all traffic)	
Tondu to Blaengarw line	GWR?	Tondu to Blaengarw (via Brynmenyn, Pontyrhyl and Pontycymmer)	Closed in 1955 (to passengers); 1997 (to freight)	Most of the line now being restored as the Garw Valley Railway.
Vale of Clwyd Railway				
Vale of Neath Railway	Great Western Railway	Neath to Merthyr Tydfil, via Gelli Tarw Junction and Quakers Yard		Part of the line still exists
Vale of Rheidol Railway	Cambrian Railways	Aberystwyth to Devil's Bridge		Privatised in 1989, heritage railway services continued
Welshpool and Llanfair Light Railway		Welshpool to Llanfair Caereinion	9 February 1931 (to passengers) 5 November 1956 (to freight)	Reopened as a heritage railway in 1963
Wrexham and Ellesmere Railway	Cambrian Railways (GWR)	Ellesmere to Wrexham, via Overton-on-Dee, Bangor-on-Dee and Hightown	1962–3 (to all traffic)	
Wrexham and Minera Railway	Great Western Railway		1970–2 (to all traffic)	
Wrexham, Mold and Connah's Quay Railway	Great Western Railway	Wrexham to Connah's Quay, via Gwernsyltt, Cefn-y-Bedd, Penyffordd and Buckley Junction	Between Wrexham and Mold, via Llanfynydd en-route	Most of the line (Wrexham to Shotton) still open
Wye Valley line	WVR	Chepstow to Monmouth	4 January 1964	Passenger Services were withdrawn on 4 January 1959. Freight trains carrying Limestone to Dayhouse Quarries continued until 1992.

== See also ==
- List of railway lines in Great Britain for extant lines.
- List of British heritage and private railways
- List of closed railway stations in Britain
- History of rail transport in Great Britain
- Beeching cuts
