= Broomhill railway station (Northumberland) =

Former station in Northumberland, England

Broomhill Railway Station
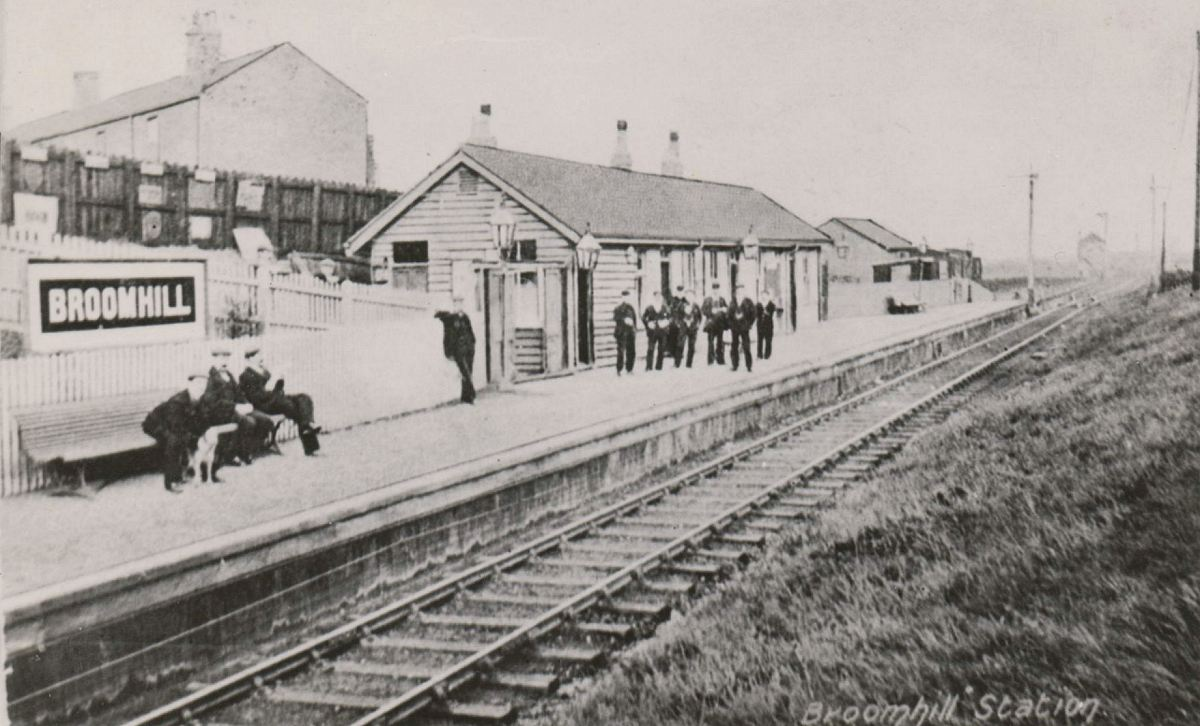
- Broomhill Station, looking north towards Amble (unknown date)

General information
- Location: England
- Coordinates: 55.30465°N 1.61356°W
- Grid reference: NU246012
- Platforms: 1

Other information
- Status: Disused

History
- Original company: North Eastern Railway
- Pre-grouping: North Eastern Railway
- Post-grouping: London and North Eastern Railway

Key dates
- September 1849: Line opened
- 2 June 1879: Station opened
- 7 July 1930: Passenger service closed
- 4 May 1964: Goods service closed

Passengers
- 27,746 (1911)
Location

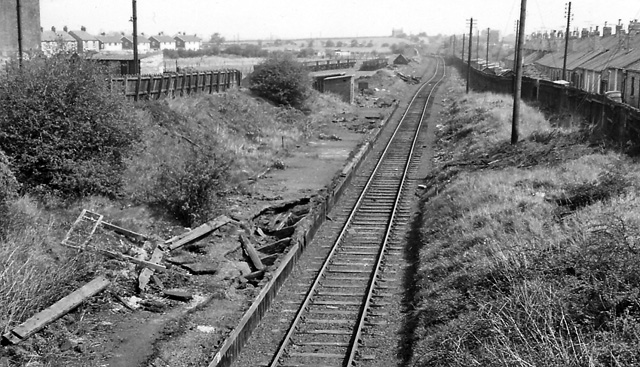
Remains of Broomhill Railway Station in 1965, a year after the goods service closed, and the complete closure of the station.

Broomhill railway station served the village of Broomhill in Northumberland, England, a former pit village. The station was on a short branch line of about 5 miles (8 km) which linked the town of Amble with the East Coast Main Line near to Chevington.

The line through the station site was opened in September 1849 by the York, Newcastle, and Berwick Railway Company (YN&BR) to carry coal from the local collieries to Amble's Warkworth Harbour, the station itself was opened on 2 June 1879 by which time the YN&BR had become part of the North Eastern Railway.

The station was located in a shallow cutting on the east side of what is now Station Road, opposite the Broomhill Hotel (now The Trap Inn), there was one platform on the north side of a single track, immediately to the east of the station was a passing loop which itself had a small goods yard and shed to its north, the yard was equipped with a 1½ ton crane. To the south of the station were extensive sidings serving Broomhill Colliery and its associated brickworks and gas works.

In the winter of 1912/1913 the station had four weekday services in each direction with an extra three or four services on Saturdays, there were no services on Sundays.

The passenger service closed on 7 July 1930, with the last train two days before on 5 July, and the goods service closed 34 years later on 4 May 1964 although by this time it had been reduced to a public delivery siding. The station had 27,746 passengers in 1911.

== Bibliography ==
- Clinker, C.R. (October 1978). Clinker's Register of Closed Passenger Stations and Goods Depots in England, Scotland and Wales 1830–1977. Bristol: Avon-Anglia Publications & Services. p. 20. ISBN 0-905466-19-5. OCLC 5726624.
- Quick, Michael (2022) [2001]. Railway passenger stations in Great Britain: a chronology (PDF). version 5.04. Railway & Canal Historical Society. Archived from the original (PDF) on 25 November 2022.
- The Railway Clearing House (1970) [1904]. The Railway Clearing House Handbook of Railway Stations 1904 (1970 D&C Reprint ed.). Newton Abbot: David & Charles Reprints. ISBN 0-7153-5120-6.
- Westlake, Ray (2012). The Territorials, 1908–1914: A Guide for Military and Family Historians. Pen & Sword Books. ISBN 9781844686568.

Preceding station	Historical railways	Following station
Chevington; Line and station closed	North Eastern Railway; Amble branch line	Amble
