= Chevington railway station =

Disused railway station in Northumberland, England

Chevington
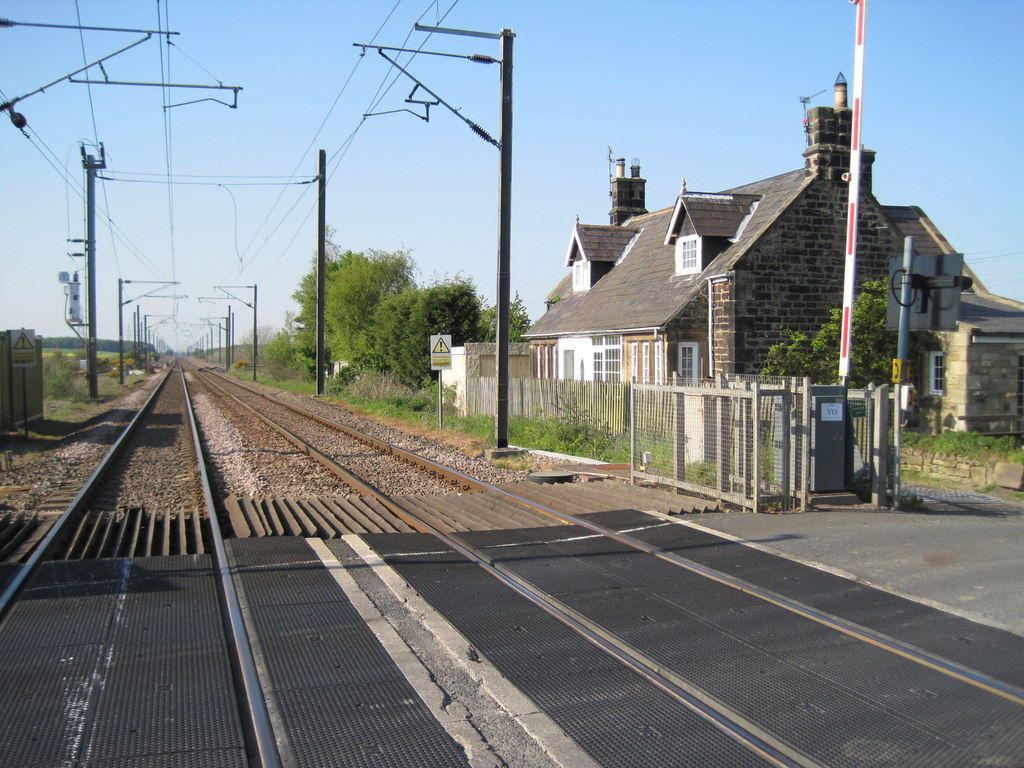
- Former location of the railway station in 2010

General information
- Location: West Chevington, Northumberland; England
- Coordinates: 55.2649°N 1.6521°W
- Grid reference: NZ222968
- Platforms: 3

Other information
- Status: Disused

History
- Original company: Newcastle and Berwick Railway
- Pre-grouping: North Eastern Railway
- Post-grouping: London and North Eastern Railway

Key dates
- 1 July 1847: Opened
- February 1879: Passenger services to Amble commenced
- 7 July 1930: Passenger services to Amble withdrawn
- 15 September 1958: Closed to passengers
- 10 August 1964: Closed completely
Location

Chevington railway station served the village of West Chevington, Northumberland, England from 1847 to 1964 on the East Coast Main Line.

== History ==
The station was opened on 1 July 1847 by the Newcastle and Berwick Railway. The station was situated on both sides of the level crossing on an unnamed lane about half-a-mile south west of the hamlet of West Chevington. On 5 September 1849, a branch line was opened to the port of Amble which diverged from the main line a mile north of Chevington though passenger services to Amble were not introduced for another 30 years.

Passenger services to Amble were replaced by bus services on 7 July 1930. In 1951 only 982 tickets were sold, an average of three per day. The station was closed to passengers on 15 September 1958 and closed completely on 10 August 1964 when goods traffic ceased.

== Accidents ==
An accident occurred on 13 September 1913, to the south of the station, when the 11:45pm express from London to Edinburgh train derailed. Its speed was between 55 and 60mph. None of the vehicles were overturned and nobody was injured in the derailment yet one person sprained their ankle when alighting from the carriage.

Preceding station	Historical railways	Following station
Widdrington; Line and station open	North Eastern Railway; York, Newcastle and Berwick Railway	Acklington; Line and station open
Terminus	North Eastern Railway; Amble branch line	Broomhill (Northumberland); Line and station closed
