= Amble branch line =

Former railway in Northumberland, England

Amble Branch Line

Overview
- Locale: Northumberland, North East England

History
- Opened: 1849
- Successor: North Eastern Railway
- Closed: 1969

Technical
- Line length: 5.75 miles (9.25 km)
- Track gauge: 4 ft 8 1/2 in (1,435 mm) standard gauge

The Amble branch line was a 5.75-mile (9.25 km) branch railway line in Northumberland, England, that ran from Amble Junction north of Chevington on the East Coast Main Line to Amble via Broomhill. The line was single track to Broomhill and then double track to Amble.

== History ==
Built in 1849 by the York, Newcastle and Berwick Railway to carry coal from the local collieries to Amble's Warkworth Harbour, the line was finally completely open to passengers in 1879.

The Amble branch became part of the London and North Eastern Railway during the Grouping of 1923. During the 1920s the line carried 750,000 tons of coal a year. The line closed to passengers seven years later, in 1930, but the goods service continued. In 1943, the council raised the question of restoring passenger services; however, the railway company stated that this would not be feasible due to the levels of freight traffic and that the necessary signal boxes had already been dismantled. The line became part of the North Eastern Region of British Railways on nationalisation in 1948. In 1964 the goods service was withdrawn and the line closed completely in 1969.
