= Yeadon railway station (England) =

Former railway station in West Yorkshire, England

Yeadon

General information
- Location: Yeadon, City of Leeds; England
- Coordinates: 53.860°N 1.688°W
- Grid reference: SE205405

Other information
- Status: Disused

History
- Original company: Guiseley, Yeadon & Headingley
- Pre-grouping: Midland Railway
- Post-grouping: London, Midland and Scottish Railway

Key dates
- 26 February 1894: Opened for goods
- 7 August 1964: Closed
Location

Yeadon railway station was a goods only railway station in West Yorkshire that operated between 1894 and 1964.

A station for Yeadon was first proposed in 1881 when the North Eastern Railway was approached to build a line between Horsforth and Guiseley via Yeadon. The North Eastern declined to be involved so the promoters of the railway sought assistance from the Midland Railway instead. With some support from the Midland Railway, a company, the Guiseley, Yeadon & Rawdon, was formed and obtained, in 1885, an act of parliament to build a branch line from Rawdon Junction to Yeadon - a distance of just over one mile (1.6 km). In 1891 the company obtained parliamentary approval for an extension of the line to Headingley. At the same time the company changed its name to the Guiseley, Yeadon & Headingley Railway Company. Despite the additional powers the company was unable to raise the necessary capital to even build the line as far as Yeadon. Instead the Midland Railway took over the powers authorised by the earlier act and built the line from Rawdon to Yeadon.

Yeadon station opened to goods traffic on 26 February 1894 and despite being equipped with all the necessary facilities for passengers, the Midland Railway did not introduce a regular passenger service on the line.

Post-grouping the station came under the control of the London, Midland and Scottish railway and continued the practice of no regular passenger traffic although it was used for excursion trains until the 1950s. During the Second World War there was an increase in freight traffic due to an Avro aircraft factory being established at nearby Leeds-Bradford airport but in spite of this demand the line was closed as a wartime economy measure in 1944. After the war the line reopened but the amount of traffic was never great and a decision was made to close both the station and the branch line. The last train ran on 7 August 1964.
