= Amble railway station =

Former railway station in Northumberland, England

Coordinates: 55.334°N 1.582°W

Amble
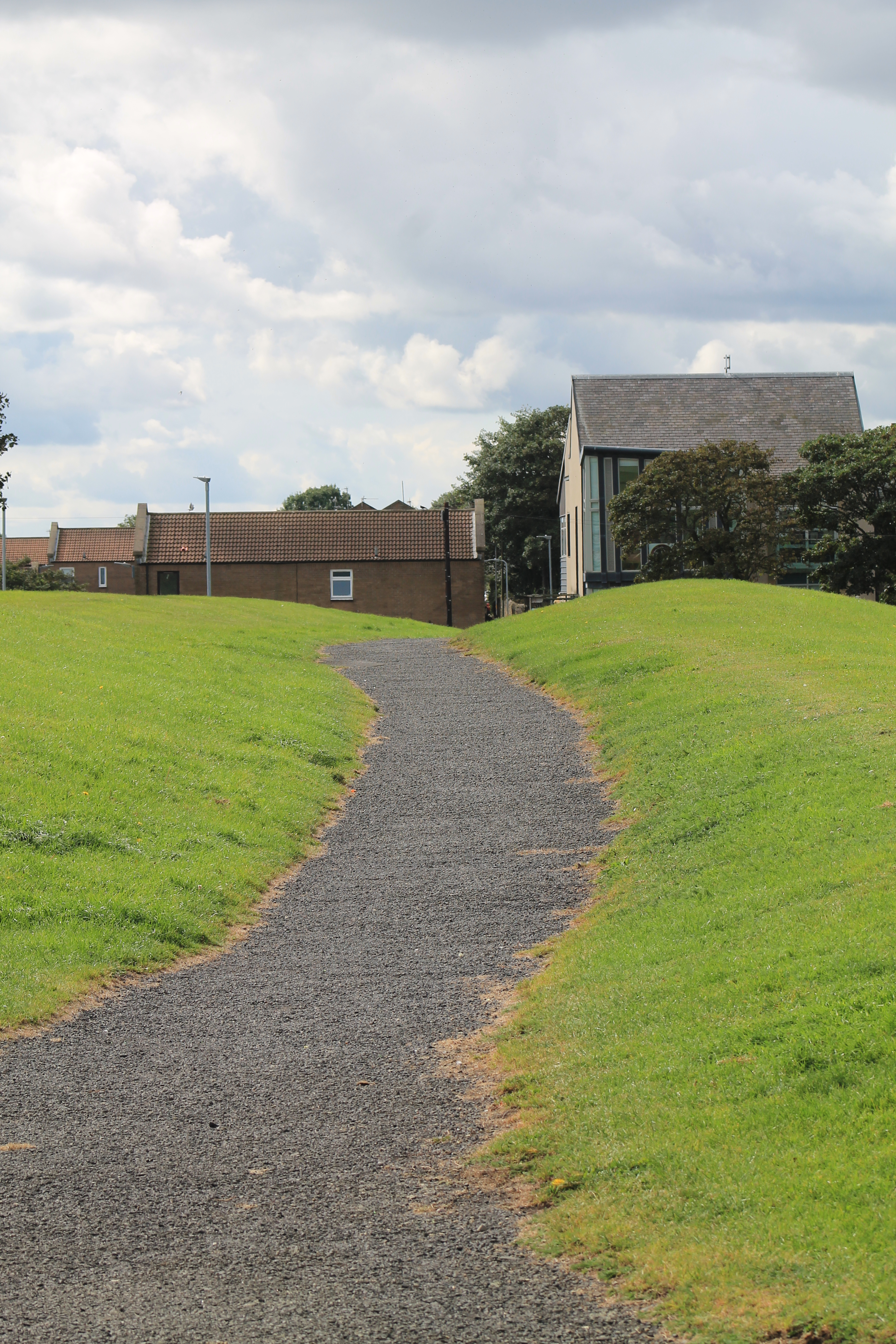
- The site of Amble railway station

General information
- Location: Amble, Northumberland; England
- Platforms: 1

Other information
- Status: Disused

History
- Original company: York, Newcastle and Berwick Railway
- Pre-grouping: North Eastern Railway
- Post-grouping: London and North Eastern Railway

Key dates
- 5 September 1849: Opened
- 7 July 1930: Closed to passengers
- 14 December 1964: Closed to general goods
- 6 October 1969: Closed to coal traffic
Location

Amble railway station served the town of Amble, in Northumberland, England. It was the terminus of the 5.75 miles (9.25 km) Amble branch line, which diverged from the East Coast Main Line at Chevington.

== History ==
Opened by the North Eastern Railway in 1849, it became part of the London and North Eastern Railway during the Grouping of 1923.

The station closed to passengers in 1930, but the goods and coal service then passed on to the North Eastern Region of British Railways on nationalisation in 1948. It was finally closed in 1969 by the British Railways Board.

Preceding station	Disused railways	Following station
Broomhill	North Eastern Railway; Amble branch line	Terminus

== The site today ==
The station was demolished and the site is now an area of public park behind the houses on the south side of George Street.
