= Eston railway station =

Disused railway station in North Yorkshire, England

Eston
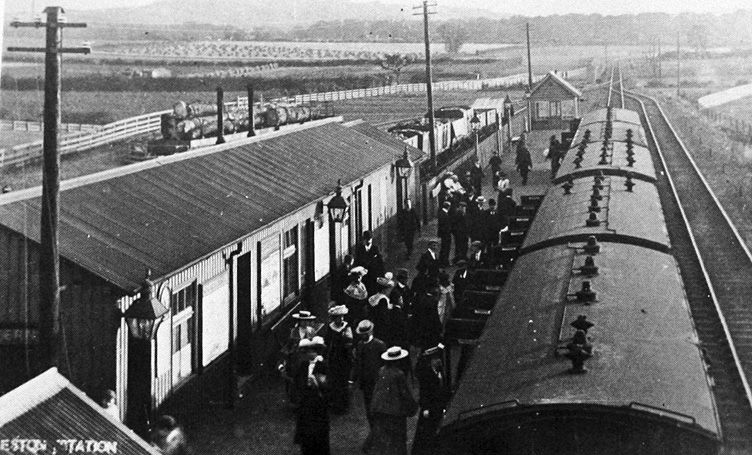
- Eston railway station in 1902

General information
- Location: Eston, Redcar and Cleveland; England
- Coordinates: 54.558601°N 1.144436°W
- Grid reference: NZ552186
- Platforms: 1

Other information
- Status: Disused

History
- Original company: North Eastern Railway
- Pre-grouping: North Eastern Railway
- Post-grouping: London and North Eastern Railway

Key dates
- 1 January 1902: Opened
- 11 March 1929: Closed to passengers
- 3 October 1966: Closed to goods
Location

Eston railway station formerly served the North Yorkshire town of Eston. It was used as a passenger station between 1902 and 1929 and as a goods-only station until 1966. It was the terminus of a short spur that curved east from the Normanby Branch of the Middlesbrough and Redcar Railway (now the Tees Valley Line). The Normanby Branch was the northern end of the former Cleveland Railway, which had been closed south of Normanby in 1873.

The station was the second to bear the name Eston. The original Eston station (which closed on 22 November 1885 and was replaced by South Bank railway station on a nearby site) was not in fact in Eston at all but was two miles north in the industrial settlement of South Bank.

When the station was opened by the North Eastern Railway on 1 January 1902, Eston had two railway connections running virtually parallel to each other about a mile apart: the Normanby Branch route to the west of Eston and the older Eston Branch Railway to the east, which had been opened in January 1851 by the mining concern Bolckow Vaughan to transport iron ore from its mines in the Eston Hills. Each branch line was about two miles long and ran north-west to join the main line on either side of Cargo Fleet railway station.

Maps of Eston railway station and surroundings
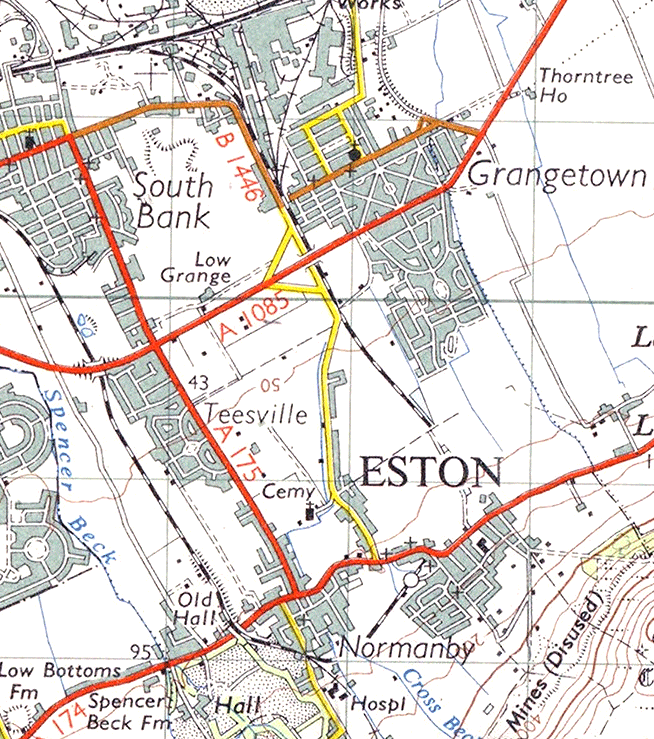
Railways around Eston in 1954, showing the Normanby Branch (left) and Eston Branch (right) with Eston station near the bottom

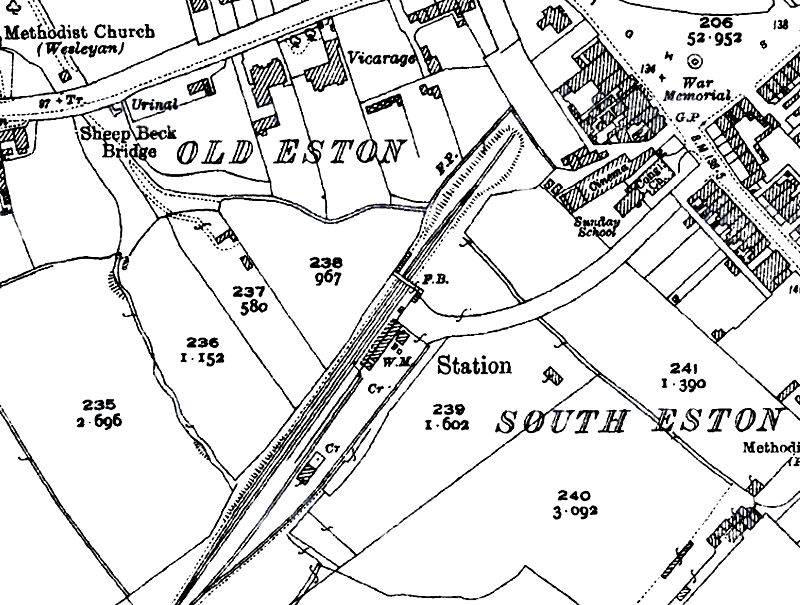
Map of Eston railway station and its surroundings in 1928, the year before its closure

The Normanby Branch crossed Flatts Lane at a level crossing just north of the junction with Hollywalk Avenue. Just to the east of the crossing, the line split three ways; a fork to the north-east went to a coal depot serving Normanby, the middle fork went on to Eston and the last fork went south-east to the brickworks of the Normanby Brick & Tile Co. The Eston Branch Railway line took virtually a mirror-image route, with a junction curving south-west into the large railway sidings of the Eston Mines Tip Yard and south-east up an incline to the Eston mines. Although the two branches terminated within only a few hundred yards of each other, they had no physical connection. The Eston Branch had no passenger stations, although the line was used for a while to transport passengers, mainly Bolckow Vaughan employees, to the mines.

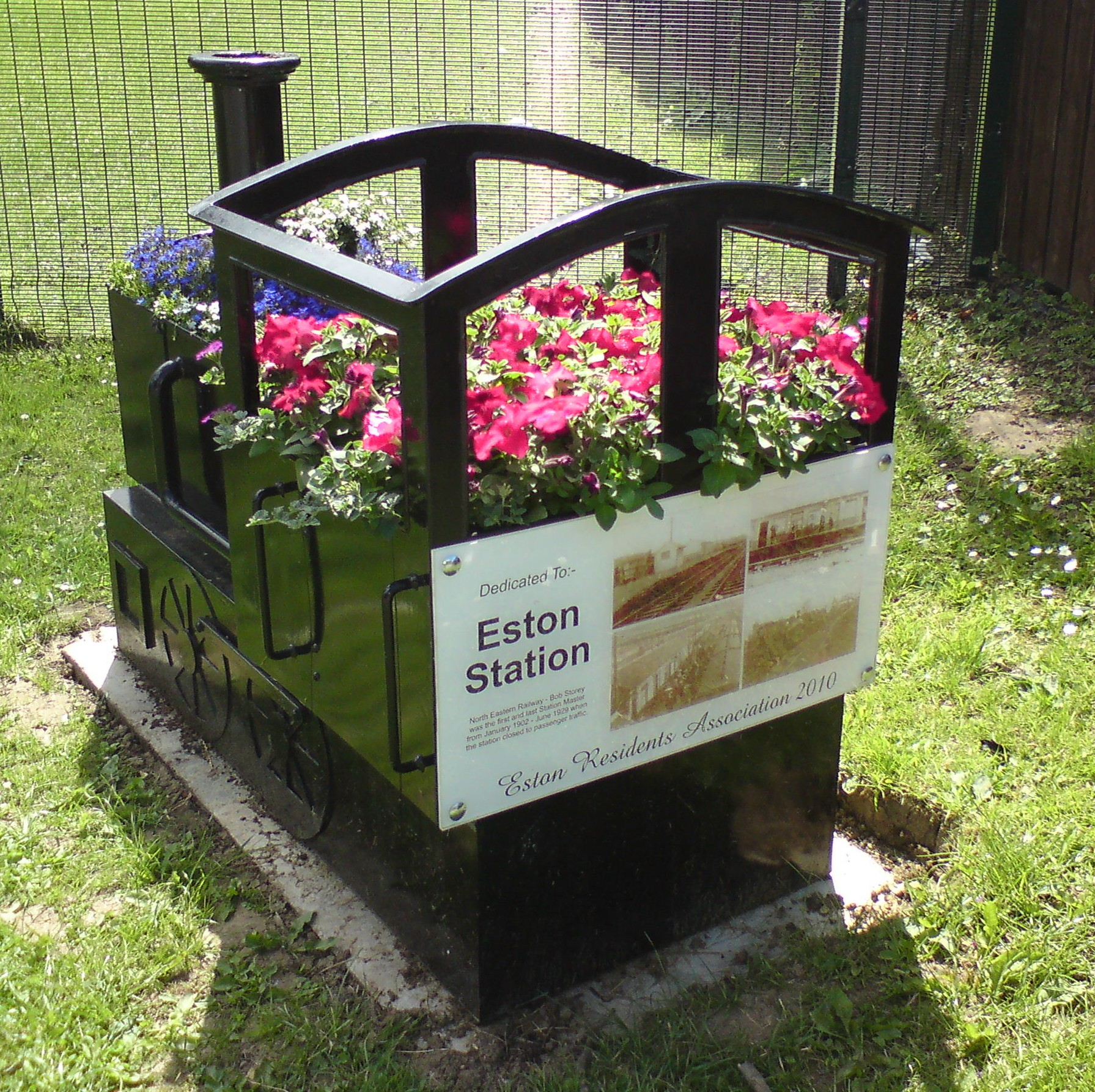
The former station is now commemorated by a locomotive-shaped planter at the old Flatts Lane level crossing site

Eston station was located on Station Road off Eston High Street. It gave direct access to the centre of the old hamlet of Eston and the mining community of California (also called South Eston). It opened on 1 January 1902 and station consisted of a single platform with a modest one-storey wooden station building and a coal depot behind. By 1911 it served a population of 28,095 people. Goods traffic was dominated by bricks, of which 6,416 tons were transported in that year.

However, the station was not heavily used by passengers. The number of tickets issued in 1911 was only 46,732 (about 128 a day). By 1925 there were only four trains per day each way, with a fifth on Saturdays, taking about 15 minutes to travel to and from Middlesbrough. The passenger service was withdrawn on 11 March 1929 and replaced with a bus, but the station remained open for goods until 3 October 1966.

Nothing now remains of Eston station and its site is now occupied by modern housing. The trackbed of the spur from the Normanby Branch has been made into a footpath and can be walked from the site of the old level crossing at Flatts Lane to Station Road in Eston. The Normanby Branch itself is also now a footpath, the South Bank Walkway, which links Flatts Lane Country Park to South Bank. The station is commemorated by a small locomotive-shaped planter with an information board, installed in 2010 near the old level crossing by the Eston Residents Association.
