= List of preserved British industrial steam locomotives =

This is the list of preserved British industrial steam locomotives. This list does not contain preserved Fireless locomotives, for a list of preserved Fireless locomotives, visit List of fireless steam locomotives preserved in Britain. Notable locomotives that weren't initially intended for industrial railway service but worked on them (e.g. Furness Railway No. 20, later Barrow Steelworks) will also be included as their rebuilding/resale classified them as industrial-employed steam locomotives.

== Use of these locomotives ==
Private companies like Manning, Wardle & Company were building locomotives as early as 1858 when E.B. Wilson and Company closed. Later located themselves at Boyne Engine Works (1840) in Jack Lane. Within the next few years, Hunslet Engine Company and Hudswell Clarke moved in besides Manning Wardle. One of Manning Wardle's oldest recorded locomotives was Sidlesham, an ex-industrial 0-6-0ST later used on West Sussex Railway. There were also companies as old or older, Kitson & Company, formerly Todd, Kitson and Laird, formed in 1838.

== Preserved locomotives ==
Over one hundred industrial tank engines have survived into preservation, from over ten different manufacturers, ranging from small to big numbers. Most of these locomotives were bought for preservation from industrial service or private use.

=== Andrew Barclay Sons & Co. ===
Over forty Andrew Barclay tank engines survived into preservation. The oldest survivor being No. 699 Swanscombe built in 1891. These lists might not contain every single locomotive preserved. Many 0-4-0 saddle tanks of small size have been preserved. Many preserved AB&SC locomotives have been preserved in several numbers at the Ribble Steam Railway, Tanfield Railway, Scottish Industrial Railway Centre and Bo’ness and Kinneil Railway. Only notable locomotives with a sizeable amount of information and/or a known recent/current status will be included. Many of these locomotives have been named after where they worked.

Steam Locomotives
Number & Name	Wheel Arrangement	Image	Current Location	Notes/Status
No. 699 Swanscombe	0-4-0ST		Buckinghamshire Railway Centre	Built in 1891. The oldest surviving Andrew Barclay locomotive. Painted in pseudo-Metropolitan Railway Red as Brill No.1. Operational, ticket expires in 2023.
No. 776 Firefly	0-4-0ST		Northampton and Lamport Railway	Built in 1896. Delivered in June 1899 to Mellingriffith and Co. Ltd. Under restoration.
No. 782 Kinlet	0-6-0ST		Blists Hill Open Air Museum	Built in 1896. Worked at Kinlet Colliery.
No. 807 Bon Accord	0-4-0ST		Royal Deeside Railway	Built in 1897. Ex-Aberdeen Gas Works. Operational following an overhaul in 2019.
No. 880 Glenfield No.1	0-4-0CT		Statfold Barn Railway	Built in 1902. Worked at the Glenfield and Kennedy works in Kilmarnock until the 1960s. Moved to RSR from Chasewater Railway. Following death of the owner in 2019, the locomotive was put up for sale and eventually moved to the Statfold Barn Railway, where it was restored and now on static display.
No. 885 The Barclay	0-6-0ST		Cambrian Heritage Railways	Built in 1900. Being cosmetically restored. Worked at Eddlewood Colliery until the 1980s when purchased for preservation.
No. 945 Annie	0-4-0ST		Whitwell and Reepham Railway	Built 1904. Under overhaul. Worked for S.J. Clave then Charles Roberts & Co. Ltd. Later sold to Yates Duxbury & Sons for work at the paper mill in Heap Bridge in 1930, when withdrawn in October 1974 Annie was the last privately owned steam locomotive in revenue-earning operation. Name comes from a then withdrawn Peckett that worked at the same site.
No. 1015 Horden	0-6-0ST		Tanfield Railway	Built in 1904. Ex-Horden Collieries. Carried the same buffer beam when involved in a collision with a LNER Q6. Undergoing heavy restoration at Marley Hill. Received extensive chassis repairs, boiler sent to workshops of Israel Newton & Sons in Derbyshire in late November 2018. New front tubeplate has been manufactured, soon to be fitted, saddle tank is under repairs at Marley Hill.
No. 1047 Storefield	0-4-0ST		East Anglian Railway Museum	Built in 1905. Ex-Cargo Fleet Iron Co. Ltd. Overhaul completed in 2013 and returned to steam.
No. 1116 NCB 16	0-4-0ST		Scottish Industrial Railway Centre	Built in 1910. Ex-Dalmellington Iron Company. Cosmetically restored and now on display at the Ayrshire Railway Preservation Group base at Engineers Shop at Dunaskin.
No. 1147 John Howe	0-4-0ST		Ribble Steam Railway	Built in 1908. Ordered by Howe's Plaster Works. Currently on static display.
No. 1175 No. 8 Dardanelles	0-6-0ST		Polkemmet Country Park	Built in 1909. Named Dardanelles after the WWI campaign in progress when Polkemmet Colliery opened. Cosmetically restored and on display as a war memorial.
No. 1193	0-4-2ST		Tanfield Railway	Built in 1919. A unique type of locomotive, one of four 0-4-2STs built. To Lothian Coal Co. Ltd. Currently unrestored at Marley Hill Yard.
No. 1219 Caledonia Works	0-4-0ST		West Somerset Railway	Built in 1910. Delivered to Stewarts & Lloyds at Clydedale Works. Operational following return to service in 2016. Based at Washford on the West Somerset Railway.
No. 1223 Colin MacAndrew	0-4-0ST		Mountsorrel and Rothley Community Heritage Centre	Built in 1911. Delivered to Colin McAndrew & Co. Now at the Mountsorrel & Rothley Heritage centre in working condition.
No. 1245	0-6-0T		Lakeside and Haverthwaite Railway	Built in 1911. Built for Carron Iron Company. Restored to working order on the Lakeside and Haverthwaite Railway in CR Livery.
No. 1260 Forester	0-4-0ST		Pontypool and Blaenavon Railway	Built in 1911. Delivered to Newport Tinplate Co. Ltd. On display at the Big Pit Mining Museum at Blaenavon.
No. 1296 NCB No. 8	0-6-0T		Scottish Industrial Railway Centre	Built in 1912. Cab, bunker, tanks and side rods stolen.
No. 1338 NCB No. 17	0-6-0T		Llangollen Railway	Built in 1913. Delivered to Dalmellington Iron Co Ltd. Being restored at the Llangollen Railway for use on the Tanfield Railway.
No. 1385 Rosyth	0-4-0ST		Pontypool and Blaenavon Railway	Built in 1914. Worked at Royal Naval Dockyard at Rosyth. Currently operational.
No. 1398 Lord Fisher	0-4-0ST		Yeovil Railway Centre	Built in 1915. Worked at Royal Naval Airship station near Rochester in Kent. Under overhaul.
No. 1458 No. 3 Victoria	0-6-0ST		Bo'ness and Kinneil Railway	Built in 1916 for Ministry of Munitions. Donated by NCB to SRPS in 1978. The locomotive was cosmetically restored in 2019.
No. 1598 Efficient	0-4-0ST		Ribble Steam Railway	Built in 1918. Spent entire working life at McKechnie Brothers’ copper smelting works at Widnes. On display in the Ribble Steam Railway's museum.
No. 1605 Ajax	0-6-0T		Isle of Wight Steam Railway	Built in 1918. After being built it worked at many locations over a period of years. Awaiting overhaul.
No. 1614 NCB No. 19	0-4-0ST		Scottish Industrial Railway Centre	Built in 1918 and used at Dalmellington Iron Company. Undergoing a cosmetic restoration.
No. 1619 Toto	0-4-0ST		Mangapps Railway Museum	Built in 1915 and used by Blaenavon Co. Ltd. Under restoration.
No. 1659 Stanley No. 32	0-4-0ST		Tanfield Railway	Built in 1920. Delivered to East Tanfield Colliery. Undergoing overhaul.
No. 1680 Nora No. 5	0-4-0ST		Big Pit National Coal Museum	Built in 1920 for the Blaenavon Co. Ltd. Now on display in the Big Pit Mining Museum at Blaenavon.
No. 1719 No. 2 Lady Nan	0-4-0ST		East Somerset Railway	Built in 1920. Returned to service in 2017 after boiler ticket expired in the same year.
No. 1823 Henry/Harry	0-4-0ST		Pontypool and Blaenavon Railway	Built in 1924. Preserved in 1972 at the Embsay and Bolton Abbey Steam Railway. Now stored at Pontypool.
No. 1833 Niddrie	0-6-0ST		Ribble Steam Railway	Built in 1924. Delivered to Niddrie Collieries. Under restoration. New firebox throatplate being shaped for 1833.
No. 1863	0-4-0ST		Caledonian Railway (Brechin)	Built in 1926. Worked at Anglo-Scottish Sugar Beet Co. at Cupar. Currently operational.
No. 1865 Alexander	0-4-0ST		Ribble Steam Railway	Built in 1926 for Southall Gas Works. Only named in preservation when at Buckinghamshire Railway Centre. Currently on static display.
No. 1875 Stanton	0-4-0CT		Midland Railway – Butterley	Built in 1925. Worked at Stanton and Staveley's Ridding yards. Now on static display at Butterley.
No. 1889	0-4-0ST		Grampian Transport Museum	Built in 1925. Worked at Aberdeen Corporation Gas Works. Now on static display.
No. 1890 Forth	0-4-0ST		Fife Heritage Railway	Built in 1926. Delivered to the Scottish Gas Board, spent most of life at Granton Gas Works in Edinburgh. Returned to steam in 2016 and operational on the Fife Heritage Railway.
No. 2127 No. 6	0-4-0CT		Bo'ness and Kinneil Railway	Built in 1942. Delivered to Clyde Alloy Steel Co. at the Craigneuk Works, Motherwell. After closure of this site, it worked at Glengarnock Steelworks as No. 6, the period livery of which it carries today. Donated to Scottish Railway Preservation Society in 1978. Static display.

=== Aveling and Porter ===
Steam Locomotives
Number & Name	Wheel Arrangement	Image	Current Location	Notes/Status
No. 3567 Sydenham	0-4-0WT		Buckinghamshire Railway Centre	Built in 1895. The locomotive worked at the wharf of Beadle Brothers until sold for use at the neighbouring Erith Oil Works. Sydenham underwent a rebuild in 1931 at the same site. Withdrawn in 1953, it was preserved in the early 1960s, eventually finding its home at the Buckinghamshire Railway Centre at Quainton Road. The locomotive was loaned to Chatham Historic Dockyard for a short operating term, returning in 2014. Stored awaiting decision on restoration.
No. 6158 Sirapite	0-4-0WT		Long Shop Museum	Built in 1906 for a gypsum mine at Mountefield. In 1929, purchase by Richard Garrett & Sons saw its use on the Leiston Works Railway, the locomotive being the first mechanical haulage of freight on site. Withdrawn in 1962, the locomotive was stored through to the closure of the Leiston line and when the site became the Long Shop Museum. Sirapite first returned to steam in 2009. 6158 was moved to the Mid Suffolk Light Railway in 2019 for the summer season as a stretch of track was laid down at its home base. Currently operational.
No. 8880 Sir Vincent	0-4-0WT		Fifield Private Railway	Built in 1917 and delivered to Vickers Armstrong Ltd at their armaments factory in Erith. It was sold in 1932, remaining in industrial service in Erith at the British Oil and Cakemills until 1966. Upon withdrawal, it was preserved and underwent a rebuild. The locomotive is currently at the Fifield Private Railway in Fifield, Berkshire where it runs during special events.
No. 9449 The Blue Circle	2-2-0WT		Nene Valley Railway	Built in 1926. It was the last locomotive built by Aveling and Porter. The locomotive's industrial career included use by the Holborough Cement Company Ltd and later the Blue Circle Cement. Donated to the Bluebell Railway in 1964. By 1997 the locomotive was at the Buckinghamshire Railway Centre, eventually operating at the Rushden, Higham and Wellingborough Railway by 2015. It wound up at the Nene Valley Railway by 2020, eventually being purchased by a volunteer based at the line. Out of service by December 2023.

=== Avonside Engine Company ===
For a list of preserved Avonside locomotives, see List of preserved Avonside locomotives

=== W.G. Bagnall ===
Steam Locomotives
Number & Name	Wheel Arrangement	Image	Current Location	Notes/Status
No. 2193 Topham	0-6-0ST		Spa Valley Railway	Built in 1922 for West Cannock Colliery Ltd, for which some of the payment was made in coal. Finally withdrawn in 1970 and preserved to the Foxfield Railway, before operating at both Foxfield and the North Downs Steam Railway, before a merger between the latter and the Spa Valley Railway saw it relocated in 1996. Currently awaiting restoration as of 2022.
No. 2469	0-4-0ST		Buckinghamshire Railway Centre	Built in 1932 for Fraser and Chalmers foundry in Erith and was numbered V45. Fitted with a second set of buffers for shunting very low wagons. Withdrawn and purchased in 1969 for preservation by a member of the Quainton Railway Centre. Currently operational.
No. 2572 Judy	0-4-0ST		Bodmin and Wenford Railway	Built in 1937 for use at the Par Docks and operated by English China Clays. Unique for being one of two 90-inch tall locomotives with driving wheels 5 feet apart to traverse the Par Moors drier. Fitted with Bagnall–Price valve gear. Paired with Alfred in 1953. Originally planned to be named Cough, though a nameplate was never fitted until 1960, when 2572 was named Judy. Withdrawn in 1969, then donated to the Wheal Martyn China Clay Museum in 1978. By 2002, Judy had been removed from the museum and sent to the Bodmin and Wenford Railway, re-joining with Alfred. Currently operational.
No. 2648 Linda	0-4-0ST		Chasewater Railway	Built in 1941 for the MoS for Royal Ordnance Factories. In 1965, 2648 was moved to the Fort Dunlop tyre works in Birmingham, where it was named Dunlop No. 6, remaining until 1971. After which, whilst at the Battlefield Line, it was named Linda before moving to the Chasewater Railway, where it is operational and carrying its Dunlop colours as of 2024.
No. 2962 No. 19	0-4-0ST		Pontypool and Blaenavon Railway	Built in 1950, 2962 was the last steam locomotive built for the Royal Navy's Devonport Dockyard. Withdrawn from service in 1965, it was then used as a stationary boiler until purchased by an employee of the dockyard, ending up at the Bodmin and Wenford Railway, not turning a wheel during its stay there. The locomotive is due to move to the Pontypool and Blaenavon Railway following a change of ownership. Currently awaiting overhaul.
No. 2994 Vulcan No. 401	0-6-0ST		North Tyneside Steam Railway	Built in 1951 as one of three New Standard 18 locomotives. Built for the Steel Company of Wales for use at the Abbey Works in Port Talbot, where it was numbered 401 and named Vulcan after the RAF bomber. Purchased in 1957 for use at Austin's Longbridge plant. Saved for preservation by the West Somerset Railway, eventually moving to the Stephenson Railway Museum, being renamed Thomas Burt after a working-class MoP who was born in the area, though it no longer carries this name in its current form; that being its first maroon scheme under SCoW ownership. Currently operational.
No. 2996 Victor No. 403	0-6-0ST		Lakeside & Haverthwaite Railway	Built in 1951 as one of three New Standard 18 locomotives. Built for the Steel Company of Wales for use at the Abbey Works in Port Talbot, where it was numbered 403 and named Victor after the RAF bomber. Purchased in 1957 for use at Austin's Longbridge plant. Saved for preservation by the West Somerset Railway where it ran for some time, departing for the Strathespey Railway in 1988 and a host of other lines afterwards. Currently awaiting overhaul at Lakeside & Haverthwaite Railway after boiler ticket expired in 2024. In Maroon livery with black and yellow lining.
No. 3058 Alfred	0-4-0ST		Bodmin and Wenford Railway	Built in 1953 for use at the Par Docks and operated by English China Clays, paired with Judy. Unique for being one of two 90-inch tall locomotives with driving wheels 5 feet apart to traverse the Par Moors drier. Preserved by the Cornish Steam Locomotive Preservation Society in 1977, then moved to the Bodmin and Wenford Railway. Currently awaiting overhaul.
No. 3059 Florence No. 2	0-6-0ST		Foxfield Railway	Built in 1953 for the National Coal Board's Florence Colliery line. Built to an identical design of a preceding locomotive, Florence No. 1 based on the same colliery system. Fitted with a tapered chimney in 1962 then withdrawn from service in 1968. Florence No. 2 sat as a spare locomotive for Florence Colliery until 1975 when it was moved to Cadley Hill, eventually being loaned by the NCB to the Battlefield Line to assist with motive power. Withdrawn with boiler repair necessary, ownership eventually passed to the Battlefield Line where it was a static display. It was bought by a Foxfield Railway member in 2000, returning to service a few years after, eventually being withdrawn in 2015. Now awaiting overhaul. One of six Cadley Hill-based locomotives to be preserved.

=== Beyer, Peacock & Company ===
Only two locomotives built by the company for industrial use have survived into preservation, one uniquely being the last surviving British standard gauge Garratt design.

Steam Locomotives
Number & Name	Wheel Arrangement	Image	Current Location	Notes/Status
No. 1827	0-4-0ST		Foxfield Railway	Built in 1878 by Beyer, Peacock for use as a shunter at their own Gorton Works. Oldest surviving industrial design. Operational as of 2021.
No. 6841 William Francis	0-4-0+0-4-0T		Bressingham Steam Museum	Built in 1937 for Baddesley Colliery and named after the founder's son. Last surviving British standard gauge Garratt locomotive. On static display.

=== Brush Electrical Engineering Company ===
Only one steam locomotive built by the then-named Brush Electrical Engineering Company is preserved.

Steam Locomotives
Number & Name	Wheel Arrangement	Image	Current Location	Notes/Status
No. 314	0-4-0ST		Mountsorrel Railway	Built in 1906. One of nine locomotives in Powlesland & Mason's Swansea Docks fleet as No. 6. Absorbed into GWR as no. 921. Withdrawn and sold to Berry Wiggins & Co. Ltd. in 1928. Withdrawn from industrial service in 1964, then on display at the Snibston Discovery Museum from 1992 until March 2016. Now at Mountsorrel Railway.

=== Dübs & Company ===
Only one standard gauge British Dübs locomotive survives in the form of a 0-4-0 crane tank.

Steam Locomotives
Number & Name	Wheel Arrangement	Image	Current Location	Notes/Status
No. 4101 'Dubs'	0-4-0CT		Foxfield Railway	Built in 1901. Operational as of Summer 2020.

=== Fletcher, Jennings & Co. ===
One standard gauge design has survived.

Steam Locomotives
Number & Name	Wheel Arrangement	Image	Current Location	Notes/Status
No. 157 No. 3 Baxter	0-4-0T		Bluebell Railway	Built in 1877 for the Dorking Greystone Lime Works where it worked its entire industrial life. Preserved in 1960 at the Bluebell Railway. Last boiler ticket expired in October 2018 and now on static display. As of its last boiler ticket duration, it carries the name Captain Baxter as it carried in the 1930s.

=== Gibb and Hogg ===
The company built twenty steam locomotives Only one has been preserved.

Steam Locomotives
Number & Name	Wheel Arrangement	Image	Current Location	Notes/Status
No. 16 No. 11	0-4-0ST		Summerlee Museum of Scottish Industrial Life	Built in 1898. First worked for Fife Coal Co. at Loganlea Colliery, being retired from service in 1967 from Cardowan Colliery. It has spent most of its preserved time on display. Currently on display at Coatbridge.

=== Hawthorns and Company ===
One locomotive built by Hawthorns and Company has survived. The company's locomotive building site was built by R. & W. Hawthorn and closed to this purpose in 1872.

Steam Locomotives
Number & Name	Wheel Arrangement	Image	Current Location	Notes/Status
No. 244 Ellesmere	0-4-0WT		National Museum of Scotland	Built in 1861 by Hawthorns and Company of Leith, for Howe Bridge Colliery until 1957, being the oldest working steam locomotive at the time. On display.

=== R. & W. Hawthorn, Leslie and Company ===
In 1831, R. & W. Hawthorn began building steam engines, and the company would become Hawthorn, Leslie and Co. in 1885 upon the merger with shipbuilders A. Leslie and Co. The drawings and patterns of Black, Hawthorn and Co. of 1865 was bought by R. & W. Hawthorn, Leslie and Co. in 1902. Several locomotives from all three iterations of the company have survived into preservation. The oldest Hawthorn, Leslie and Co. survivor being No. 2450 Commander B built in 1899.

Steam Locomotives
Number & Name	Wheel Arrangement	Image	Current Location	Notes/Status
R. & W. Hawthorn
No. 2009 No. 3 Enterprise	0-4-0ST		Whaley Bridge	Built in 1884 for Tredegar Wharf Co. It was rebuilt after 1937 and sold to wagon builders R.Y. Pickering, numbered 3. Preserved in 1979. Left Tanfield in 2024 for restoration to commence.
Black, Hawthorn and Company
No. 305 Bauxite No. 2	0-4-0ST		National Railway Museum, York	Built in 1874 for a Bauxite mine. Withdrawn in 1947, but was donated to the North Eastern Society of Engineering Historians by George Cohen, Sons and Co. It entered the National Collection in 1953. It is on display but has not been restored, so as to demonstrate the condition many industrial locomotives endured during their careers.
No. 912 City of Aberdeen	0-4-0ST		Bo'ness and Kinneil Railway	Built in 1887 for the Aberdeen Gas Works. It was fitted with motion skirting as the locomotive would operate near to public streets, its use continuing until the late 1950s. Donated to the SRPS in 1972, it has jumped from Bo'ness to the Tanfield Railway, remaining in ownership of the SRPS, until it finally returned to its home base at Bo'ness in 2017.
R. & W. Hawthorn, Leslie and Company
No. 2780 Asbestos	0-4-0ST		Chasewater Railway	Built in 1909. Worked at Turner Brother's Manchester Asbestos sheeting factory until 1968. Boiler ticket expired in 2012, and the locomotive is on static display.
No. 2859 No. 2	0-4-0ST		Tanfield Railway	Built in 1911. First employed to Keighley Gas Works, numbered 2. In 1940, the locomotive was sold to the Royal Ordnance Factory at Cargenbridge. Upon takeover by ICI in 1949, the locomotive moved to Grangeston until it was preserved in 1976. The locomotive has had many stints of operation, and is operational as of September 2023.
No. 3056 NCB No. 14	0-4-0ST		Tanfield Railway	Built in 1914. Ex-Lambton, Hetton & Joicey Collieries. It was the last locomotive on site when it left in 1968 for the Beamish Museum. Left for the Tanfield Railway in 2010, and currently stored in LH&JC green.
No. 3135 37 Invincible	0-4-0ST		Isle of Wight Steam Railway	Built in 1915. Worked at Woolwich Arsenal until mid-1950s until moved to the Royal Aircraft Establishment at Farnborough. After withdrawal and preservation in 1968, the locomotive eventually found its way to the Isle of Wight Steam Railway where for a period during the 1970s, it was the railway's only operable steam locomotive. Last withdrawn in 2009 and is currently under overhaul.
No. 3437 Isabel	0-6-0ST		Epping Ongar Railway	Built in 1919. Delivered to ICI's Blackley plant where it worked for 60 years. Isabel was damaged in 1926 during the General Strike, when some enthusiasts drove her into her sister locomotive, writing it off. Upon withdrawal, 3437 was initially preserved on the Keighley and Worth Valley Railway, then fell under the care of the Somerset and Dorset Trust, both at Radstock North, then Washford after closure of the former site. The locomotive first steamed in preservation in 2005, before Isabel was sold to another owner where she was rarely used and later sold to the Epping Ongar Railway in 2012. Withdrawn in 2014 for an overhaul, she returned to steam in 2017 and is currently operational for special events and leisurely seasons.
No. 3865 Singapore	0-4-0ST		Rutland Railway Museum	Built in 1936. Delivered to the Royal Navy Dockyard in Singapore. The locomotive survived World War II, albeit battle-scarred, under both Allied and Axis powers, falling to Japanese control in 1942 but was returned to the United Kingdom in 1953, working at Chatham. It would enter preservation in 1972, firstly at the short-lived Ashford Steam Centre, then at the Rutland Railway Museum where it returned to service in the mid-2000s. The locomotive is a registered war memorial of Far Eastern Prisoners of War 1941-45 and went on display in London, 2005 to mark 60 years since the end of the Second World War. It is currently under overhaul.
No. 3931 Linda	0-6-0ST		Ribble Steam Railway	Built in 1936 for Stewarts & Lloyds' site at Corby and is one of three of a Hawthorn Leslie design from the site that are preserved. Still at Corby by 1970 after the site fell under ownership of the British Steel Corporation and was painted in buttercup yellow. Following a farewell to steam tour, Linda moved to the Battlefield Line, then the Gwili Railway before returning to service on the Ribble Steam Railway in 2015. Stored whilst condition, for restoration, is inspected.

=== Haydock Foundry ===
Several locomotives were built for work at the Haydock Collieries. One built to a design by Josiah Evans is preserved.

Steam Locomotives
Number & Name	Wheel Arrangement	Image	Current Location	Notes/Status
Bellerophon	0-6-0WT		Foxfield Railway	Built in 1874, the third of six well tank locomotives built at Haydock. Bellerophon worked at Haydock Colliery until 1964. She was donated to the Keighley & Worth Valley Railway, then purchased by the Vintage Carriages Trust whereafter the locomotive has been on loan to the Foxfield Railway.

=== Hudswell Clarke ===
One locomotive built by Hawthorns and Company has survived. The company's locomotive building site was built by R. & W. Hawthorn and closed to this purpose in 1872.

Steam Locomotives
Number & Name	Wheel Arrangement	Image	Current Location	Notes/Status
No. 402 Lord Mayer	0-4-0ST		Museum of Rail Travel on KWVR	Built in 1893. Worked at the Salford Ship Canal Dock. The locomotive was used on several projects and duties since 1900, On display.
No. 679 31 Hamburg	0-6-0T		Keighley & Worth Valley Railway	Built in 1903. Worked for Manchester Ship Canal. Preserved in June 1967. Hamburg uniquely carries a whistle from DB Class 82 0-10-0T. On display.
No. 680 32 Gothenburg	0-6-0T		East Lancashire Railway	Built in 1903. Worked for Manchester Ship Canal. First steamed in preservation in 1987 on the East Lancashire Railway, hauling the first train upon the line's reopening. Sometimes disguised as Thomas The Tank Engine for Day Out with Thomas events. Operational
No. 750 Waleswood	0-4-0ST		Peak Rail	Built in 1906. Worked at Waleswood Colliery and named after such. Preserved in 1972, steaming at the Steamport in the mid-1970s. Eventually ended up at the Chasewater Railway before moving to Peak Rail in 2024. Operational.
No. 1026 No. 31	0-6-0ST		Fawley Hill Railway	Built in 1913 for the Sir Robert McAlpine company. The locomotive was eventually put up for sale and bought for £100 by Sir William McAlpine in the early 1960s. No. 31 now operates on the Fawley Hill Railway, on Sir William's estate. Currently under overhaul as of July 2024.
No. 1208 Nightingale and Seacole	0-6-0ST		Embsay and Bolton Abbey Steam Railway	Built in 1916 for the Ministry of Munitions. The locomotive carried multiple names, firstly Mitchell through use by multiple companies during its industrial life, including Sir Robert McAlpine. In 1930, named Illingworth it has carried this name in preservation. Withdrawn in 1957, the locomotive first operated on a preserved line in 2017 on the Embsay and Bolton Abbey Steam Railway after a long spell in private ownership. Renamed Nightingale and Seacole in April 2022 after Florence Nightingale and Mary Seacole.
No. 1369 MSC No. 67	0-6-0T		Middleton Railway	Built in 1919 for the Manchester Ship Canal. Preserved in 1969 and is currently on static display at the Middleton Railway.
No. 1544 Slough Estates No. 3	0-6-0ST		Middleton Railway	Built in 1924 for the Slough Trading Estate where it worked as No. 3. The locomotive was withdrawn from use in 1970 upon removal of the company's railways. Initially at the Swindon and Cricklade Railway, now on loan to the Middleton Railway where is it under overhaul.

=== Hunslet Engine Company ===
The Hunslet Engine Company are noteworthy for their design and production of the "Austerity" 0-6-0ST shunter, though not all were built by the company, many locomotives being subcontracted by Hunslet to other builders.

Steam Locomotives
Number & Name	Wheel Arrangement	Image	Current Location	Notes/Status
No. 299 Hodbarrow No. 5	0-4-0ST		Statfold Barn Railway	Built in 1884 for Hodbarrow Mine, Millom as No. 5, working until the early-mid 1960s. It is the eldest complete example of a standard gauge Hunslet-built industrial locomotive. Currently on static display.
No. 469 Hastings	0-6-0ST		Kent & East Sussex Railway	Built in 1888 for Manchester Ship Canal contractors, originally named Liverpool. Upon it being sold to Price, Wills & Reeves, the locomotive was renamed Hastings. It worked at Rotherham in 1915 then to Sproxton Quarry in 1935. Purchased for preservation on the Kent & East Sussex Railway in 1964 and returned to steam the following year. The locomotive jumped from the Mangapps Railway Museum to the Elsecar Heritage Railway, then finally steamed in May 2021 at the Statfold Barn Railway, 4 months later to the Chasewater Railway before returning to the Kent & East Sussex Railway in May 2022. The locomotive subsequently failed on trials and undertook repairs and was operational for the Bluebell Railway's Branch Line Gala in April 2023.
No. 686 The Lady Armaghdale	0-6-0ST		Severn Valley Railway	Built in 1898 for the Manchester Ship Canal as St John. During WWI, its name was removed and simply numbered 14. Withdrawn from MSC service in 1962 by ICI for use at Blackley, where it was given the name The Lady Armaghdale which was carried by the Hawthorn Leslie locomotive it replaced. Withdrawn in 1968, The Lady Armaghdale was preserved in 1969 and moved to the Severn Valley Railway. The locomotive had been disguised as Thomas the Tank Engine for relevant events in the 2000s before withdrawal in 2009, now on static display.
No. 1873 Jessie	0-6-0ST		Pontypool and Blaenavon Railway	Built in 1937 for the Guest Keen & Baldwins Iron & Steel Company, where it was put to work in the East Moors works in Cardiff, being number 18 in their fleet. Withdrawn in 1965, it was put on display by the Council of Cardiff, at which point subject to vandalism before being sold by its then owners sold it to a member of the Dean Forest Railway. During the locomotive's restoration, it moved to Llangollen where restoration was completed in 2003. The locomotive was converted to a side tank during its next overhaul so it could run as Thomas the Tank Engine for events; these changes were reverted in 2019 by which point the locomotive was added to the fleet of the Pontypool and Blaenavon Railway.
No. 3782 Arthur	0-6-0ST		Buckinghamshire Railway Centre	Built in 1953 for the National Coal Board to a 1923 design. It was deployed to Markham Main Colliery where it worked up until 1976, being the last Doncaster-based NCB steam locomotive in operation. Arthur jumped from several private collections after preservation in 1976 before it wound up in the care of the Buckinghamshire Railway Centre in 1979. It was stored at the site awaiting an overhaul, until one was reported to have been making progress in December 2022.

=== Kitson & Company ===
Out of all industrial Kitson & Co designs, one of their locomotive constructions were their long-boiler pannier tank locomotives built in the 1880s, originally a Stephenson design, with some working at Barrow Steel and two long boiler locomotives are believed to have worked at Dowlais Ironworks in Wales as No. 34 'Lord Wimbourne', one of which, No. 5 of 1883, survives today. Many other industrial Kitson locomotives survive, another well-known one being Lambton Railway 0-6-2T No. 29 of 1904.

Steam Locomotives
Number & Name	Wheel Arrangement	Image	Current Location	Notes/Status
No. 2509	0-6-0PT		North Tyneside Steam Railway	Built in 1883. A very common Kitson design, and a very common (long boiler) design in general. Delivered to Consett Iron Company. It lasted in industrial service until 1972. Overhaul is now considered, depending on costs.
No. 29	0-6-2T		North Yorkshire Moors Railway	Built in 1904. Ex-Lambton, Hetton & Joicey Collieries. Very similar in design to the Hull and Barnsley Railway class F1 and Lancashire, Derbyshire and East Coast Railway class A. Operational.
Austin No. 1	0-6-0ST		Llangollen Railway	Built in 1932. Built for Austin Motor Company. Currently under overhaul at Llangollen Line, based at Lavender Line.
44 Conway	0-6-0ST		Locomotion, Shildon	Built in 1933 to a Manning Wardle design after Kitson & Co acquired all drawings and plans after closure in 1926. This Manning Wardle design dates from 1917. Worked for Stewarts & Lloyds Ltd. Being cosmetically restored at Shildon.
45 Colwyn	0-6-0ST		Northampton & Lamport Railway	Built in 1933 to a Manning Wardle design after Kitson & Co acquired all drawings and plans after closure in 1926. This Manning Wardle design dates from 1917. Worked for Stewarts & Lloyds Ltd. Under restoration at the Northampton & Lamport Railway.
47 Carnarvon	0-6-0ST		South Devon Railway	Built in 1934 to a Manning Wardle design. Worked for Stewarts & Lloyds Ltd. Currently under overhaul.

=== Manning, Wardle & Co ===
Steam Locomotives
Number & Name	Wheel Arrangement	Image	Current Location	Notes/Status
641 Sharpthorn	0-6-0ST		Bluebell Railway	Built in 1877. Hired by Joseph Firbank for the construction of the Lewes and East Grinstead Railway. Became property of Samuel Williams & Sons in 1888 until 1982. Moved to the Bluebell Line in 1981 and has remained there since. Due to its maximum pulling capacity being very low, no proper consideration has gone into her potential restoration yet.
865 RAF No. 111 Aldwyth	0-6-0ST		Leeds Industrial Museum	Built in 1882 for Lucas-Aird and Perry Co. Later sold to Air Ministry to work at RAF Kenley in Surrey, later moved to MoW depot at RAF Kidbrooke. Now on static display.
1207 The Welshman	0-6-0ST		Foxfield Railway	Built in 1890 for Llay Hall Colliery. Rare long-boiler locomotive, of which only two were built, 1207 was later rebuilt by its makers in 1908. On loan to the Foxfield Railway for storage, owned by National Coal Mining Museum
1210 Sir Berkeley	0-6-0ST		Middleton Railway	Built in 1891. Used by Logan and Hemingway in the construction of the MSLR (later renamed GCR). Continued to be in used by L&H until liquidation in 1935. Received Sir Berkeley nameplates from a scrapped Manning Wardle locomotive. Underwent complete rebuild/overhaul in the 1950s, in 1957 1210 was replaced by a Hudswell Clarke locomotive when Sir Berkeley was declared redundant. Was kept as a back-up engine and later preserved in 1964 and went to the Keighley and Worth Valley Railway. Later purchased by the Vintage Carriage Trust. Overhaul complete in 2007 and withdrawn in early 2017 for another overhaul to return to service. This has begun and is underway. On loan from the VCT to the Middleton Railway.
1317 Rhiwnant	0-6-0ST		Private Site/destined for Spa Valley Railway	Built in 1891. Used by the Birmingham Corporation. Used in the construction of the Elan Valley Railway. Sold to Stewarts & Lloyds in 1912. Withdrawn in the late 1960s and sold for preservation to the Nottinghamshire Transport Centre at Ruddington. Moved to a private site in Kent, although believed to have moved to Portland for restoration to begin.

=== Locomotives sold into industrial use ===
Steam Locomotives
Number & Name	Railway & Class	Image	Current Location	Notes/Status
No. 20	Furness Railway Class A5 0-4-0		Ribble Steam Railway	Built in 1863 by Sharp, Stewart & Company. Withdrawn in 1870 and sold to Barrow Hematite Steel Company as BHSC No. 7 and was converted to an 0-4-0ST. Rebuilt with a new boiler in 1915 and re-wheeled 1950. Withdrawn from industrial use in 1960 and placed at George Hatswell Special School in Barrow until moved to Walney Island. It was purchased privately in 1983 and relocated to Steamtown Railway Museum. After restoration began, one of the owners' deaths it was sold to the Furness Railway Trust in 1990. On 24 August 1996, the Heritage Lottery Fund awarded the FRT £97,000 to the restoration of No. 20 to its original FR tender locomotive condition. It passed its boiler examination in January 1999 and was launched into service on the 20 April 1999. It was withdrawn from service in July 2018 for an overhaul which began in October 2018. Locomotive is now operational, as of 2023 and has been making visits to other heritage railway sites for special events.
No. 25	Furness Railway Class A5 0-4-0ST		Ribble Steam Railway	Built in 1865 by Sharp, Stewart & Company. Withdrawn in 1870 and sold to Barrow Hematite Steel Company as BHSC No. 17 and was converted to an 0-4-0ST. Withdrawn from industrial use in 1960 and placed at Stone Cross Special School until 1980 and purchased privately in 1983 and relocated to Steamtown Railway Museum. No. 25 was put up for sale in 2011. It was then donated to the Furness Railway Trust in May 2018. The locomotive will be rebuilt as an 0-4-0 Saddle Tank. Frames arrived at Ribble Steam Railway in November 2018 but restoration will not start until No. 20's overhaul has been completed.
No. 807	Oxford & Aylesbury Tramroad 0-4-0WT		Buckinghamshire Railway Centre	Built in 1872 by Aveling and Porter. Purchased for the opening of the Oxford & Aylesbury Tramroad and ran for 22 years until withdrawal from the then-Brill Tramway and sale to Blisworth and Stowe Brick & Tile Co. 807 was stored from 1940 to 1950 when purchased by the Industrial Locomotive Society. It was cosmetically restored by London Transport to its former glory, eventually moving to the London Transport Museum in Covent Garden before it put on loan to the Buckinghamshire Railway Centre when the former site underwent refurbishment, and has remained there, now on static display.
No. 110 Burgundy	London, Brighton & South Coast Railway Class E1 0-6-0T		Isle of Wight Steam Railway	Built in 1877 at Brighton Works. Renumbered B110 by the SR in 1923. Withdrawn from service in 1927 and sold to Cannock and Rugeley Colliery Company and the boiler replaced with a WG Bagnall boiler. It was renumbered CRC No. 9 by using an inverted No. 6 number plate from an 1876 locomotive. Withdrawn in 1963 and sold in 1970 and stored at Hednesford until 1970, being moved to the Chasewater Railway before being sold to members of the East Somerset Railway in 1978. Overhaul began in 1986 and returned to service in 1993 but was withdrawn from service in 1997 due to firebox issues. In 2000, ESR members started work on 110 to find the problem and some parts were but progress was slowed. In 2011, 110 was cosmetically restored and painted in a fictitious British Railways black livery and numbered 32110 before being moved to the Isle of Wight Steam Railway. It is undergoing an assessment for a major overhaul and has been given the identity W2 Yarmouth, the name worn by one of the E1s that operated on the original line in 1932.
No. 1378 Margaret	Narberth Road and Maenclochog Railway 0-6-0ST		Scolton Manor Museum	Built in 1878 by Fox, Walker and Company for the Narberth Road and Maenclochog Railway. To the North Pembrokeshire and Fishguard Railway in 1884 and eventually the Great Western Railway as No. 1378 and then sold to the Gwendreath Valleys Railway as No. 2 in 1911, then back to the GWR but was again sold, this time to the Kidwelly Tinplate Company, before allocation of a number, where it worked until 1941
No. 752	Lancashire & Yorkshire Railway Class 23 0-6-0ST		Keighley & Worth Valley Railway	Built in 1881 as an 0-6-0 Tender locomotive Class 25. Rebuilt in 1896 at Horwich as an 0-6-0 Saddle Tank Class 23. Renumbered 11456 by the LMS in 1923. It was sold to Blainscough Colliery in 1937. It was then purchased for preservation from the NCB in 1967 by the L&Y Saddletank Fund, later called the L&Y Railway Preservation Society. It was moved from the colliery to the Keighley & Worth Valley Railway in November 1971 and first steamed in May 1972. Significant maintenance was undertaken on 752 to ready it for participation in the Rail 150 Celebrations in May 1980. It was withdrawn from service in 1982 at 101 years old. Restoration work started in July 2016 at the East Lancashire Railway. An agreement between the ELR and the owners mean that No. 752 will operate on the East Lancs primarily and make visits to the Keighley & Worth Valley Railway too. It is appropriate as Class 23s operated at Castleton performing shunting. The locomotive was hoped to be in steam by 2020. In July 2019, the boiler was fitted and the locomotive moved under its own steam in October 2019. It returned to service in February 2020.
No. 5 Cecil Raikes	Mersey Railway Class I 0-6-4T		Museum of Liverpool	Built in 1885 by Beyer, Peacock & Company Withdrawn in 1904 and sold to Shipley Colliery. It was preserved in 1965 after being in storage for a few years at Derby Locomotive Works and was presented to the Museum of Liverpool by the British Railways Board. Currently on display at the Museum of Liverpool.
No. 1340 Trojan	Alexandra Dock Railway 0-4-0ST		Didcot Railway Centre	Built in 1897 by Avonside Engine Company as Works No. 1386. Owned by Messrs Dunn & Shute of Newport Town Dock before purchased by the Alexandra Dock Railway in 1903. Renumbered 1340 by the Great Western Railway in 1923. Withdrawn in 1932 at Cardiff and sold to Netherseal colliery. It was then sold to Alders Paper Mill in Tamworth in 1947. Saved for preservation by John True in 1968 then given to the Great Western Society at Didcot. Restored to steam from 2002 to 2011. It 2016, the locomotive was sent away for a contract overhaul but costs have slowed this effort down and is still under overhaul and not present at Didcot.
No. 28	Taff Vale Railway Class O1 0-6-2T		Gwili Railway	Built in 1897 at the Taff Vale Railway's West Works. It was the last-Welsh build standard gauge steam locomotive. Renumbered 450 by the GWR in 1922. Withdrawn by the GWR on 30 October 1926 and sold for use on the Woolmer Military Instructional Railway and named Gordon in 1927. It was renumbered WD 205 and 70205 for usage during World War II and was then sold to the National Coal Board for use of the Hetton Colliery line and renumbered 67. Overhauled in 1955 but withdrawn five years later and donated to the British Transport Board before being moved to Caerphilly. Caerphilly closed in 1963 and No. 67 became part of the National Collection. It was restored to service in 1983 and was taken out of service 7 years later. The locomotive was moved to the Dean Forest Railway in 1996 after the Caerphilly Railway closed. 28 was cosmetically restored by 2014. It is currently on static display at the Gwili Railway with a plan to restore the locomotive to steam underway as of October 2019.
No. 85	Taff Vale Railway Class O2 0-6-2T		Keighley & Worth Valley Railway	Built in 1899 by Neilson, Reid & Company as the first member of the class. Renumbered 426 by the GWR in 1922. Withdrawn in 1927 and sold to Lambton, Hetton & Joicey Colliery in 1929. Became NCB No. 52 in 1947. Withdrawn from industrial use in 1968 and sold to the Midland & Great Northern Railway Preservation Society, later sold to the Keighley & Worth Valley Railway in 1970. It was rebuilt from its industrial modifications and returned to service in the 1990s until withdrawn in 2010. No. 85 returned to service in 2016 after an overhaul.
No. 26	Port Talbot Railway 0-6-0ST		Severn Valley Railway	Built in 1900 by Hudswell Clarke Renumbered 813 in 1922 by the GWR. It was withdrawn in 1933 and sold in 1934 to Robert Stephenson & Company. It was later sold again to Backworth Collieries. It was later passed into the ownership of the National Coal Board and re-numbered NCB 11 in 1950. In 1966, NCB 11 was put on spare engine duties and sold in 1967 to the GWR 813 Preservation Society and was moved to the Severn Valley Railway. Was a static exhibit at the Rail 150 Celebrations in Shildon. It was at the GW150 Exhibition at Didcot in 1984. Restoration had started initially in 1967 after it was preserved but was halted after a lack of general resources. It was steamed again in 1976 but failed again. After another failed attempt to run 813 in 1984, work continued in 1996 that was undertaken by the SVR's Locomotive Department. It returned to service in July 2000, making visits to other heritage lines before being withdrawn in September 2009. It returned to service in August 2016. It is still owned by the GWR 813 Preservation Fund.
No. 9	Glasgow & South Western Railway Class 5 0-6-0T		Riverside Museum	Built in 1917 by North British Locomotive Company Re-numbered 324 in 1919 by the G&SWR and 16379 by the LMS. It was withdrawn in 1934 and sold to Llay Main Colliery Colliery. It was preserved in 1966 at the Museum of Transport, Glasgow. It was moved to the Riverside Museum in 2010.
No. 2	North Staffordshire Railway New L Class 0-6-2T		Foxfield Railway	Built in 1923 at the North Staffordshire Railway's Stoke Works. Built in the early months of 1923 and soon renumbered 2271 by the LMS. Withdrawn and sold to Manchester Collieries in October 1937. It received the name 'Princess' while working at Walkden Colliery. In 1960, No. 2 was restored to its North Staffordshire livery and put on display at Crewe by British Railways. After this, No. 2 returned to colliery workings until it was preserved in the Staffordshire County Council Museum. It then moved to Chatterley Mining Museum in 1984 and was placed in the NRM's National Collection. After Chatterley closed in 1993, the locomotive moved to the Churnet Valley Railway but after restoration attempts at the time being hopeless, it moved to Shildon in 2004. In April 2016, the National Railway Museum gifted the locomotive to the Foxfield Railway and are currently assessing No. 2 with a hope of returning it to steam in the future.
No. 16528	London, Midland and Scottish Railway Fowler Class 3F 0-6-0T		Midland Railway – Butterley	Built in 1927 by Hunslet Engine Company. Withdrawn in April 1966, the locomotive was sold to the National Coal Board, being preserved in 1970. It is currently under restoration, having never steamed in preservation.
No. 7754	Great Western Railway 0-6-0PT		Llangollen Railway	Built in December 1930 by North British Locomotive Company Withdrawn in January 1959 and sold to the National Coal Board, working at Talywain and Mountain Ash collieries. When it was withdrawn from service in 1975, it was the last British mainline-built operating steam locomotive in the UK. The NCB had been persuaded to donate 7754 to the National Museum of Wales, who then placed the locomotive on permanent loan to the Llangollen Railway. It returned to steam in 1994 but 18 months later was withdrawn from service after the angle ring was found to be cracked. The locomotive is now owned by the Llangollen Railway Trust and is currently under overhaul.
