= Steam technology =

Articles on Steam technology include:

- Advanced steam technology
- Boiler
- List of steam technology patents
- Steam engine
- Water-tube boiler
- Supercritical steam generator
