= List of fireless steam locomotives preserved in Britain =

A list of fireless steam locomotives preserved in Britain.

== Barclay locomotives ==
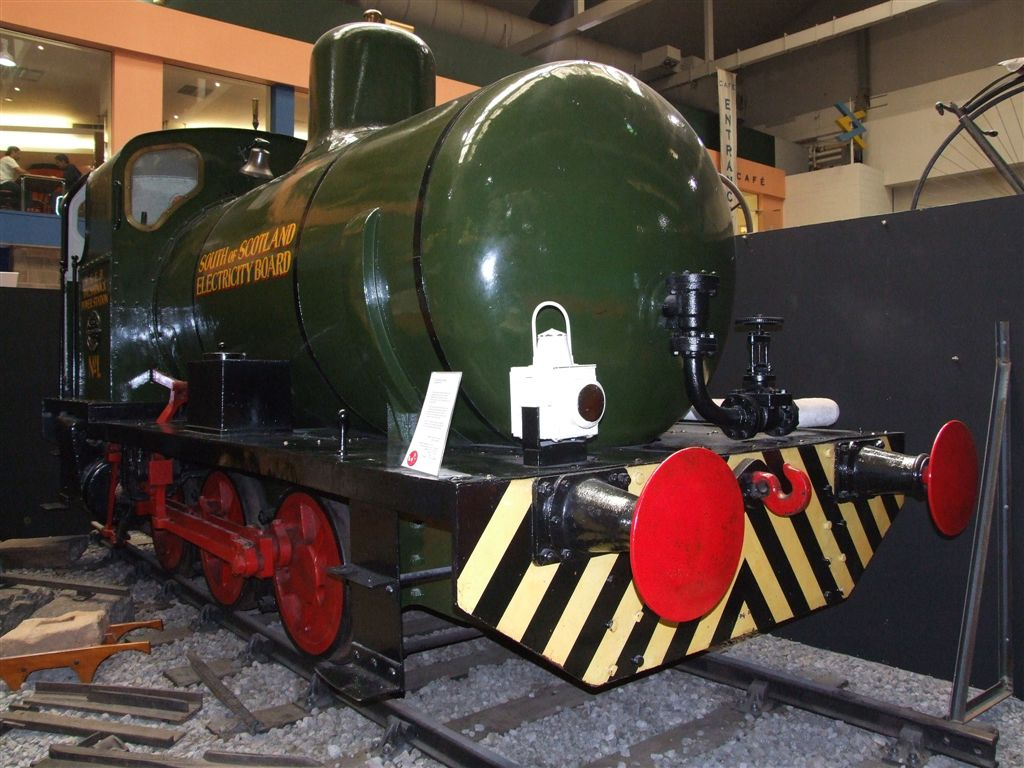
South of Scotland Electricity Board, No. 1, probably Barclay 1571 of 1917

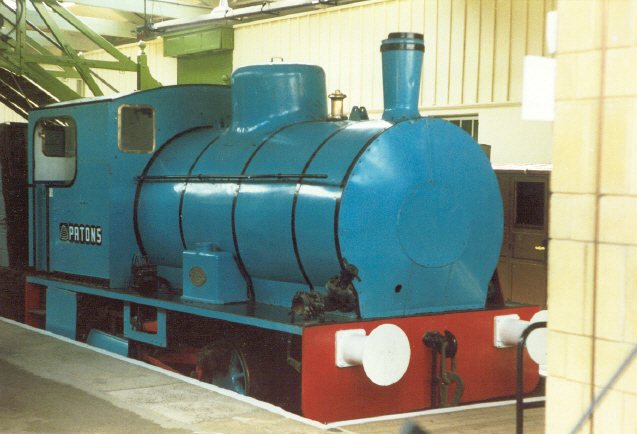
Bagnall fireless locomotive (works no. 2898, built 1948) at Darlington (The purpose of the 'chimney' at the front is unknown.)

Locomotives built by Andrew Barclay:

Works number/build date, site of preservation

- 1472/1916, Bressingham Steam Museum
- 1473/1916, Swansea Industrial and Maritime Museum
- 1477/1916, Buckinghamshire Railway Centre
- 1550/1917, On static display at HM Factory, Gretna
- 1571/1917, Glasgow Museum of Transport
- 1572/1917, Carnforth, Lancashire
- 1815/1924, Snibston Discovery Park, Coalville, Leicestershire
- 1876/1925, Sittingbourne and Kemsley Light Railway
- 1944/1927, Telford Steam Railway, Shropshire
- 1950/1928, Ribble Steam Railway, Preston, Lancashire
- 1952/1928, Scottish Industrial Railway Centre
- 1966/1929, National Museum of Wales, Nantgarw
- 1984/1930, West Somerset Restoration, Williton
- 1989/1930, Bo'ness and Kinneil Railway
- 2008/1935, Midland Railway - Butterley, Derbyshire
- 2126/1942, National Waterways Museum, Gloucestershire
- 2238/1948, National Museum of Wales, Nantgarw
- 2243/1948, Buckinghamshire Railway Centre
- 2268/1949, Carnforth, Lancashire
- 2373/1956, National Railway Museum, York

== Bagnall locomotives ==
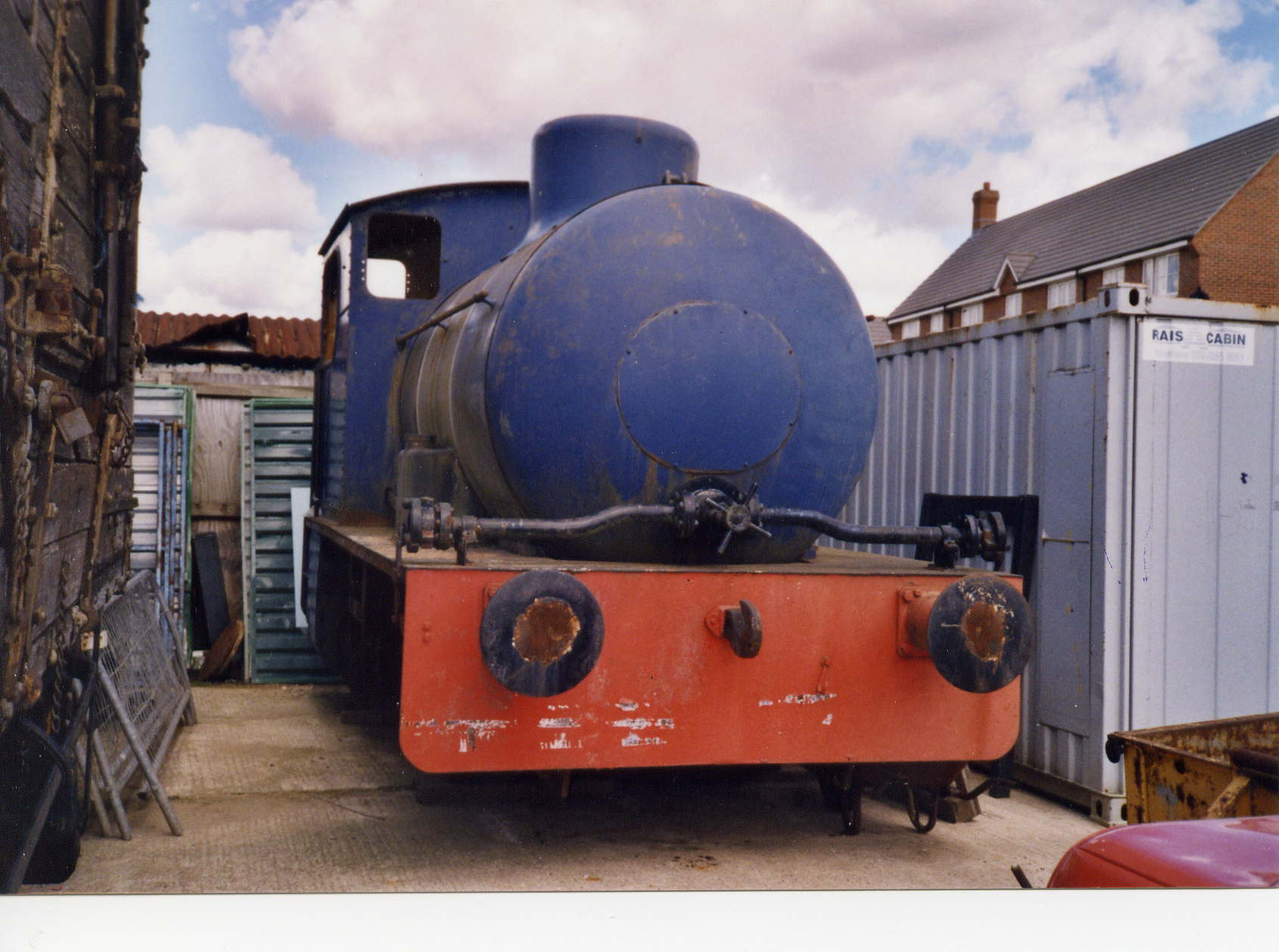
Bagnall 0-4-0 of 1932, works number 2473, "Huntley & Palmers No.1" (from Reading). Seen here on the Cholsey & Wallingford Railway in 2005.

Locomotives built by W.G. Bagnall:

Works number/build date, site of preservation

- 2216/1923, Sittingbourne and Kemsley Light Railway (2 ft 6in gauge)
- 2370/1929, Blaby "Wakes" Showground, Blaby, Leicestershire - visible from the Leicester to Nuneaton railway line
- 2473/1932, Privately preserved in West Yorkshire
- 2898/1948, Darlington Railway Preservation Society
- 3019/1952, K J Bownes & Sons Depot, Worksop, Nottinghamshire
- 3121/1957, Bodmin and Wenford Railway

== Other locomotives ==
Locomotives built by other manufacturers:

Builder, works number/build date, site of preservation

- Hawthorn Leslie, 3746/1929, Tanfield Railway
- Robert Stephenson and Hawthorns, 7803/1954, Stonham Barns Leisure & Retail Village, Suffolk
- Peckett and Sons, 2155/1955, Irlam, Salford, Manchester

== See also ==
- List of preserved British industrial steam locomotives

== Sources ==
- Industrial Locomotives: including preserved and minor railway locomotives. Vol. 15EL. Melton Mowbray: Industrial Railway Society. 2009. ISBN 978-1-901556-53-7.
- Industrial Locomotives: including preserved and minor railway locomotives. Vol. 18EL. Melton Mowbray: Industrial Railway Society. 2019. ISBN 978 1 901556 99 5.
