= Fireless locomotive =

Locomotive powered by a reservoir of superheated steam or compressed air

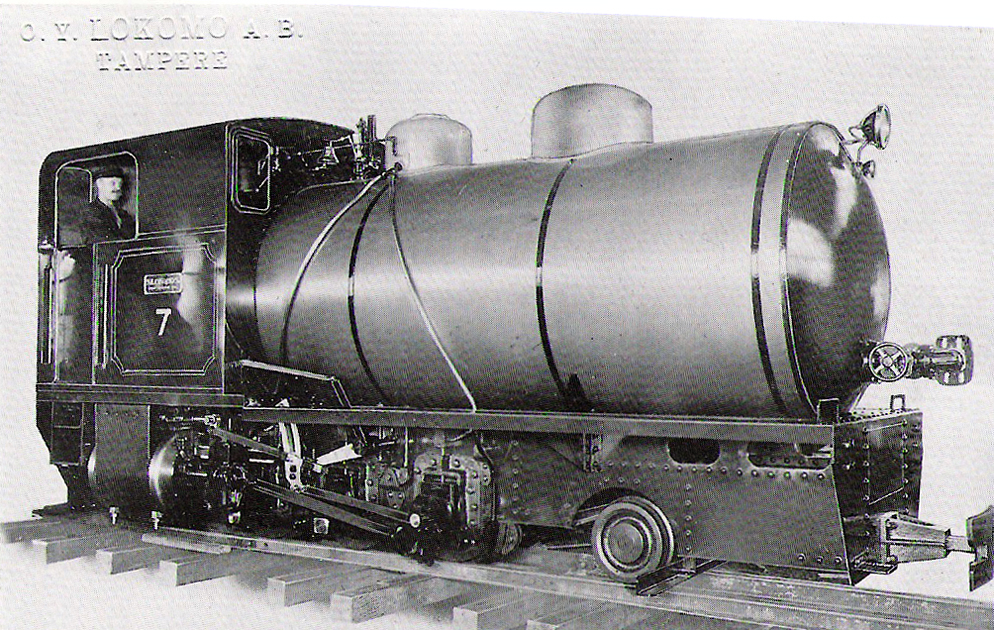
Finnish fireless locomotive showing typical configuration. Note the fitting at the front of the tank for refilling.

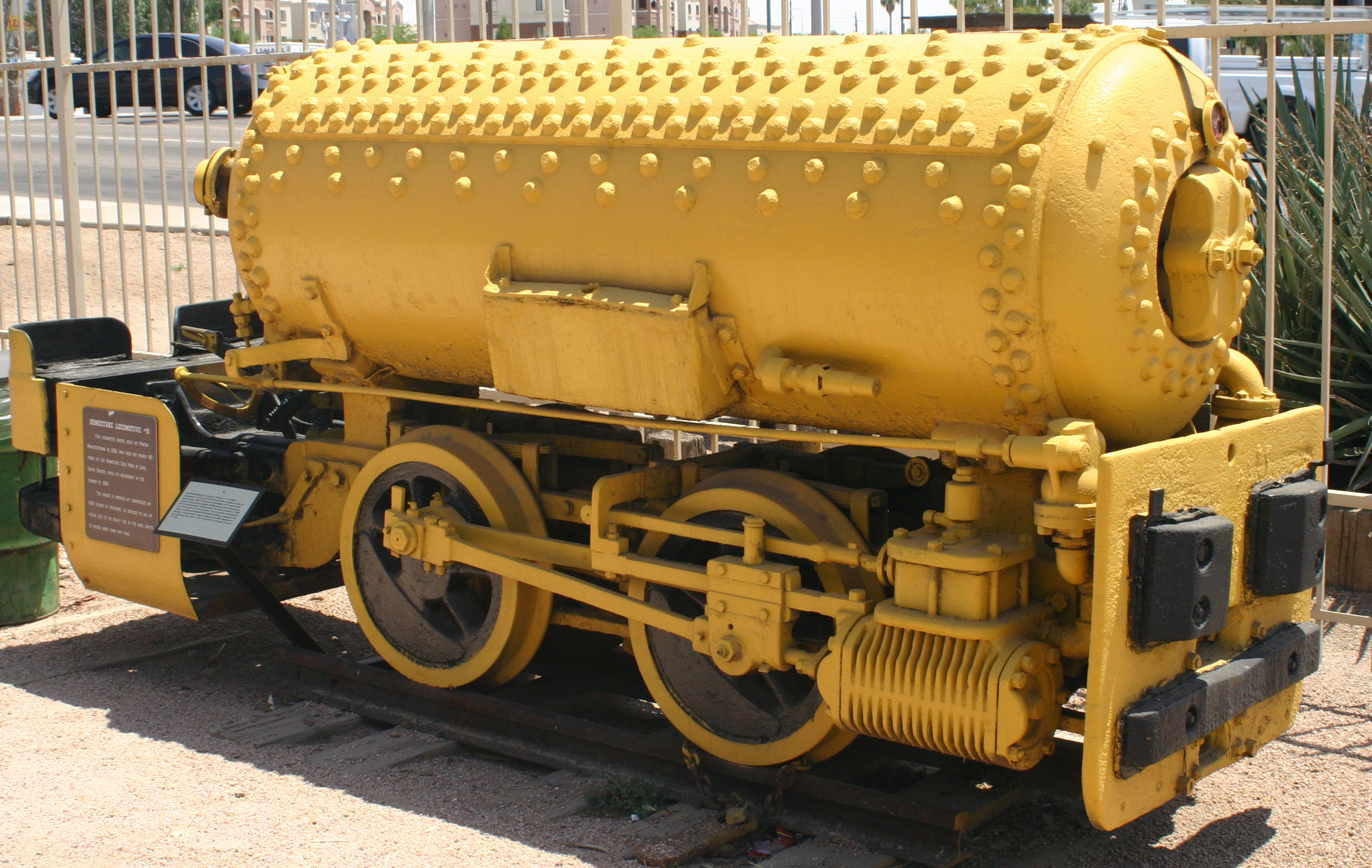
Preserved H.K. Porter, Inc. No. 3290 of 1923 powered by compressed air

A fireless locomotive is a type of locomotive which uses reciprocating engines powered from a reservoir of compressed air or steam, which is filled at intervals from an external source. They offer advantages over conventional steam locomotives of lower cost per unit, cleanliness, and decreased risk from fire or boiler explosion; these are counterbalanced by the need for a source to refill the locomotive, and by the limited range afforded by the reservoir.

They were desirable in situations where smoke from a firebox would be too noxious, or where there was risk of fire or explosion. Typical usage was in a mine, or a food or chemical factory. They were also used where a source of air or steam was readily available, and for moving loads within limited areas, such as a switch yard or within an industrial factory.

They were eventually replaced for most uses by diesel and battery electric locomotives fitted with protective appliances; these are described as flame-proof locomotives. They still have some limited use at factories that produce large amounts of excess steam and where the tasks of the locomotive do not require it to move far from the steam source.

== History ==
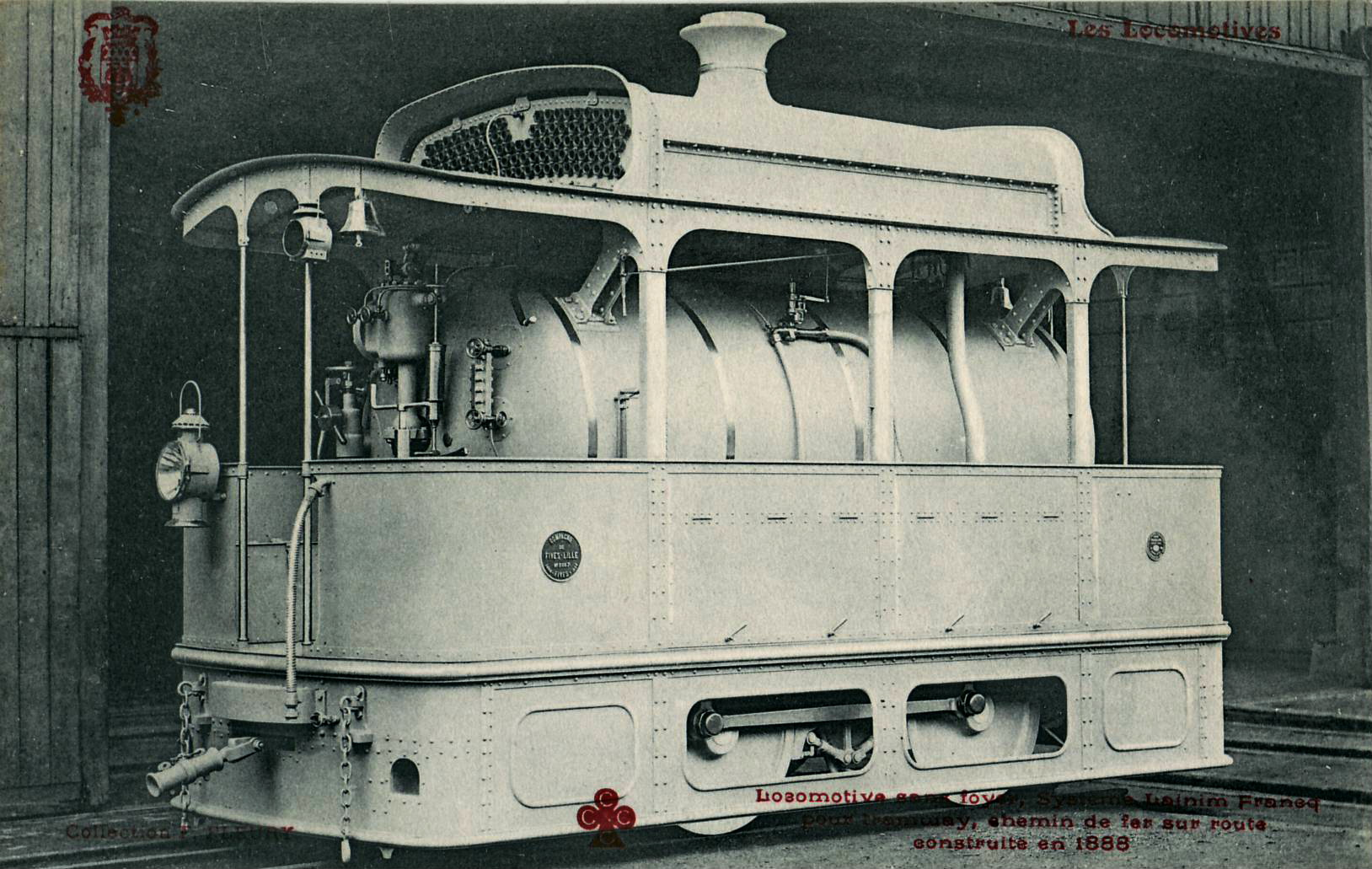
Lamm & Francq fireless tram engine, 1888

John Fowler attempted to make a "hot brick" locomotive for the London Metropolitan Railway, but trials in 1861-1862 demonstrated that the idea was not yet mature, and this embarrassing failure was later nicknamed Fowler's Ghost.

An early application of the fireless locomotive was to street tramways in the United States. Emile Lamm developed two types of fireless locomotive, one using ammonia and the other using stored steam. Lamm founded two companies, Ammonia & Thermo-Specific Propelling Company of America in 1872 and (with Sylvester L. Langdon) Lamm Fireless Engine Company in 1874. Lamm's fireless engines were briefly popular, both in the United States and in France, but were soon displaced by electric trams. The French locomotives were built in association with Leon Francq, under the name Lamm & Francq.

The fireless system then gained a new lease of life for industrial shunting locomotives. Any factory which possessed a stationary boiler could use it to charge a fireless steam locomotive for internal shunting operations. Fireless shunting locomotives became especially popular in Germany and some remained in service into the 1960s. Fireless industrial shunters were usually of the 0-4-0 or 0-6-0 wheel arrangement but some 0-8-0s were built, by companies including Heisler. Pennsylvania Power and Light "D", in the gallery below, is an example of an 0-8-0 fireless Heisler locomotive.

As of 2020, fireless locomotives were used for shunting the heavy coal hopper trains for the thermal power station in the German town of Mannheim.

== Motive power types ==
=== Steam ===
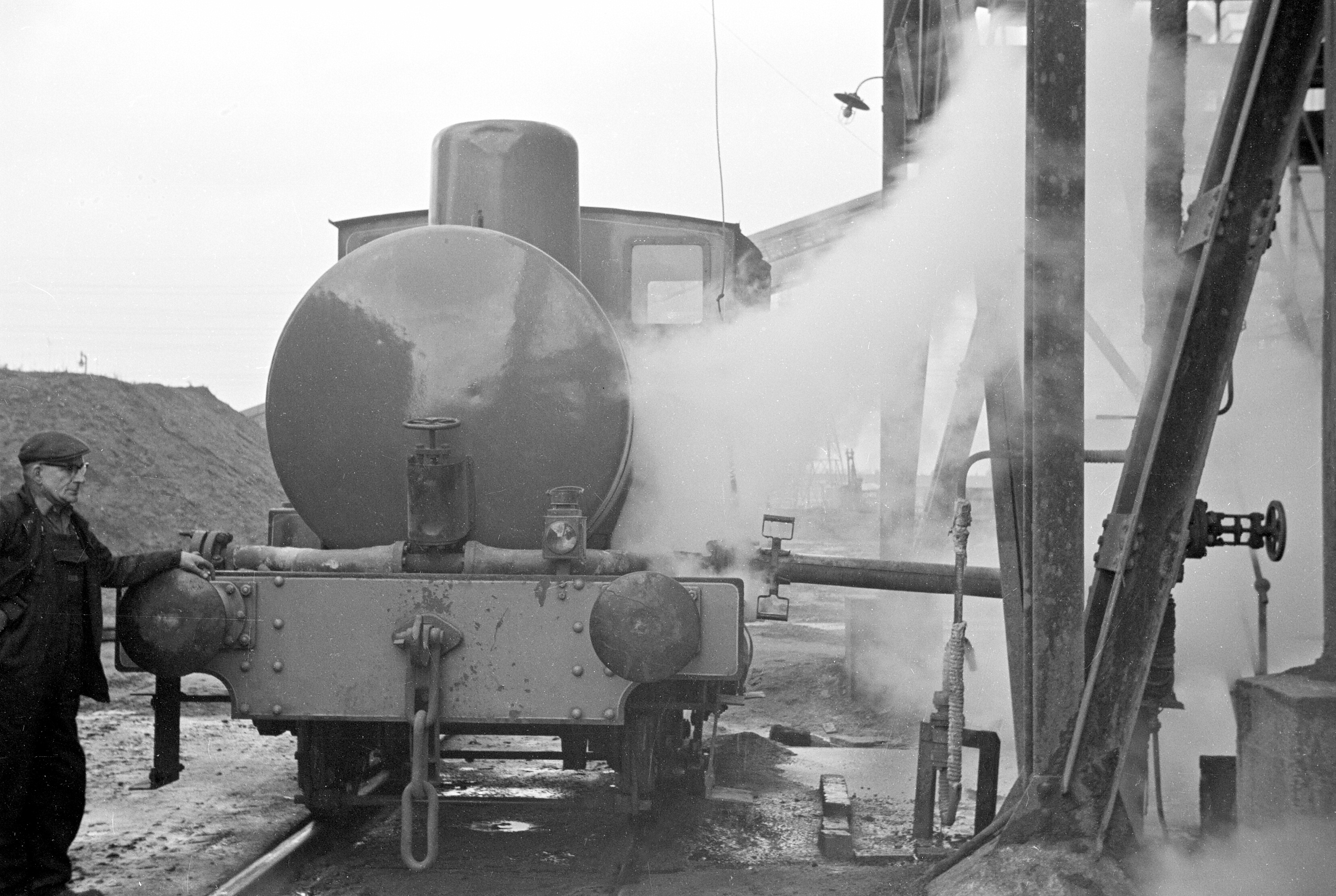
Fireless steam locomotive being recharged with high-pressure steam at Leicester power station in 1967

A fireless steam locomotive is similar to a conventional steam locomotive, but has a reservoir, known as a steam accumulator, instead of a boiler. This reservoir is charged with superheated water under pressure from a stationary boiler. The engine works like a conventional steam engine using the high pressure steam above the water in the accumulator. As the steam is used and pressure drops, the superheated water boils, replacing the used steam. The locomotive can work like this until the pressure has dropped to a minimum useful level or the water runs out, after which it must be recharged.

European fireless steam locomotives usually have the cylinders at the back, while American ones often have the cylinders at the front, as in a conventional locomotive. Major builders of fireless steam locomotives in the UK included Andrew Barclay and W. G. Bagnall.

=== Compressed air ===
Outside Switzerland, the first locomotive to run on compressed air was built in 1890, and by 1895, the basic principles of efficient compressed air engines had been developed. A particularly important engineering breakthrough was the development of the reducing and stop valve which maintains a uniform pressure of air to the engine, even as the pressure in the storage tank reduces with use. Compressed air locomotives have been used for many years, mainly in mines, but have also been used on tramways. (See Mekarski system)

=== Hybrid ===
Several hybrid locomotives have been built that have either used a fire for part of the time, e.g., Fowler's Ghost of London's Metropolitan in 1861, or have used a fire to superheat stored steam, such as the Receiver Locomotives built by Sentinel Waggon Works. None has been a success.

== Wheel arrangements ==
Most fireless locomotives have been of 0-4-0 or 0-6-0 wheel arrangement but there have been some 0-8-0 and even a few 0-10-0. Some 600 mm (1 ft 11 5/8 in) gauge 0-10-0 fireless locomotives from the German company Henschel were used in the construction of the Baghdad Railway, probably to avoid the risk of carbon monoxide poisoning during the boring of tunnels.

Another German company, Hohenzollern, built some articulated fireless steam locomotives with a cab at each end. Only one of the bogies was powered, making the wheel arrangement B-2.

The Chemins de fer de L'Ouest in France also built compressed air locomotives with B′B′ wheel arrangements for the Meudon Tunnel in the early 1900s, despite being quite similar to diesel and electric locomotives, both in wheel arrangement and in having a cab at each end, they did not seem to be successful and were all scrapped by 1910, being replaced by simpler electric locomotives.

== Current use ==
Regular steam traction became obsolete in the 1950s in the United States, and throughout the 1960s to 1990s in Europe, and was largely replaced by diesel or electric traction. However, fireless steam has its merits, especially where there is an abundant cheap source of steam, such as in industrial sites, at thermal power stations or refuse incineration plants, where fireless steam locomotives are used for shunting at very low cost.

As they do not emit any exhaust except steam, they can shunt into buildings without endangering the workforce with noxious fumes.

Considering that shunting locomotives are typically working for only about 10% of the time, 90% waiting for work; a diesel locomotive, idling most of the time, burns too much fuel while producing nothing. A well insulated modern steam accumulator can preserve pressure over many hours, but is nevertheless ready to provide tractive effort immediately. Thus the operating cost of a fireless steam shunter can be far less than that of a comparable diesel, and is an environmentally-friendly alternative to the internal combustion engine.

Fireless locomotives are also safer to operate than conventional steam locomotives, aside from the elimination of ignition hazards. The primary cause of a locomotive boiler explosion is the depletion of boiler water, through inattention or excessive use, exposing the crown sheet directly to the flames of the firebox without the cooling effect of the water covering, weakening it to the point of failure. A fireless locomotive eliminates this danger—if it runs out of sufficient water, it simply ceases to move—although precautions must be taken as with any other pressure vessel. Furthermore, they do not require careful monitoring of water levels and boiler pressure, or careful distribution of coal in the firebox for efficient combustion, and thus can be operated by less-skilled staff, not requiring a fully qualified locomotive engineer and fireman.

=== Germany ===
Several locomotive builders produced fireless engines throughout the 20th century. Meiningen Steam Locomotive Works was still building them in the 1980s. Some fireless locomotives are in daily use even in 2021. One example is the large coal-fired power station in Mannheim where coal is delivered by rail in long trains of self-discharging hopper wagons. Three fireless engines are used to shunt the hoppers on the premises of the power station.

East Germany, preferring to use its abundant supply of lignite to imported fuel, used fireless engines extensively. A series of 200 fireless locomotives was built at RAW Meiningen as late as the 1980s.

=== Indonesia ===
In 1882, the steam tramway in Batavia (Jakarta) Nederlands-Indische Tramweg Maatschappij started this traction with a series of 20 fireless engines, supplied by the German Hohenzollern with the track gauge 1188 and the serial numbers 244 to 263, labeled as I to XX.

In 2017, Semboro sugar mill in Jember, East Java used two fireless locomotives due to the presence of flammable bagasse. The locos were built by Orenstein & Koppel in Germany in 1928 and 1929 and were used for shunting inside the mill.

Pagottan sugar mill in Madiun, also in East Java used three Luttermöller axle locomotives, numbered 6, 7 and 8. These were conventional steam locomotives that were converted to fireless operation in 2011.

=== Switzerland ===
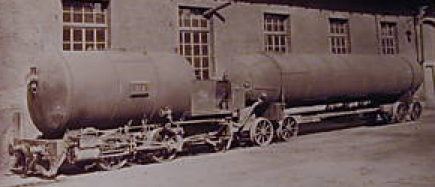
Locomotive used in the construction of the Gotthard Rail Tunnel

The 15 km (9.3 mi) Gotthard Tunnel construction (1872–82), introduced compressed-air locomotives.

Switzerland had used older fireless engines in industry, such as breweries, which were taken out of use in the 20th century. In the 21st century the steam company Dampflokomotiv- und Maschinenfabrik refurbished two locomotives of the German Meiningen type and modernised them for use on industrial sidings.

== Preservation ==
Numerous examples have been preserved across the world.

=== Germany ===
The German Wikipedia has a list of steam accumulator locomotives preserved in that country. It includes over 100 preserved fireless engines, 8 of them operational.

=== Mexico ===
The Mexico City railroad museum has a fireless steam locomotive Davenport no. 013 "Sin Fuego". It was a donated by Pemex and operated from 1940s – 1990s at the 18 de marzo refinery.

=== South Africa ===
The Electricity Supply Commission of South Africa (ESKOM) has preserved two fireless steam locomotives. They are Bagnall 0-6-0F no. 2571 of 1937 and Hawthorne Leslie 0-4-0F no. 3858 of 1935.

=== United Kingdom ===
One notable example is "Lord Ashfield" (Andrew Barclay works no. 1989 of 1930) at the Museum of Science and Industry in Manchester. It ran in limited service in the 1990s sharing a steam supply with the stationary exhibits.

The Ayrshire Railway Preservation Group has rebuilt its Andrew Barclay 0-4-0 fireless locomotive (Works Number 1952 of 1928). The engine returned to service in 2015, and operates as part of a demonstration freight train.

=== United States ===
The North Carolina Transportation Museum in Spencer has a fireless steam locomotive, the North Carolina Power and Light #3 0-4-0.

Three National Cash Register 0-4-0 fireless switchers have been preserved: two, named Dayton and Rubicon, at Carillon Historical Park in Dayton, Ohio, and one, named South Park, at the National Museum of Transportation in Kirkwood, Missouri.

Pennsylvania Power and Light "D", an 0-8-0 switcher, is preserved in the Railroad Museum of Pennsylvania.

Union Electric Company 4, a 0-4-0 is preserved in the Illinois Railway Museum of Union Illinois.

Cleveland Electric Illuminating Company, an 0-6-0 built by the H.K. Porter Company, is preserved in the Mad River and NKP Railroad Museum in Bellevue, Ohio

North American Rayon Company, 1936 H.K. Porter Company, 0-6-0F Fireless Locomotive, Elizabethton, Tennessee. The locomotive was called "The Pot". This rare fireless locomotive was built in 1936 for the North American Rayon Company (N.A.R.C.) of Elizabethton. Its steam was supplied from a large reservoir located inside of the N.A.R.C. plant. Fireless locomotives were used in industrial situations where there was an increased risk of fire. N.A.R.C. made Rayon, which is a highly flammable material. The locomotive retired from service in 1992 and it is possibly the last fireless locomotive to be retired from service in the United States. N.A.R.C. shutdown in 2000 and donated "The Pot" to the Carter County Chamber of Commerce and is on public display in Elizabethton, Tennessee.

Connecticut Coke Company 3, a 1930 H.K. Porter Company 0-4-0F, is owned by the Valley Railroad and is currently on display at the Westbrook (CT) Outlet Mall.

The Heart of Dixie Railroad Museum in Calera, AL has a recently cosmetically restored 0-4-0 Davenport on display.

Preserved fireless locomotives
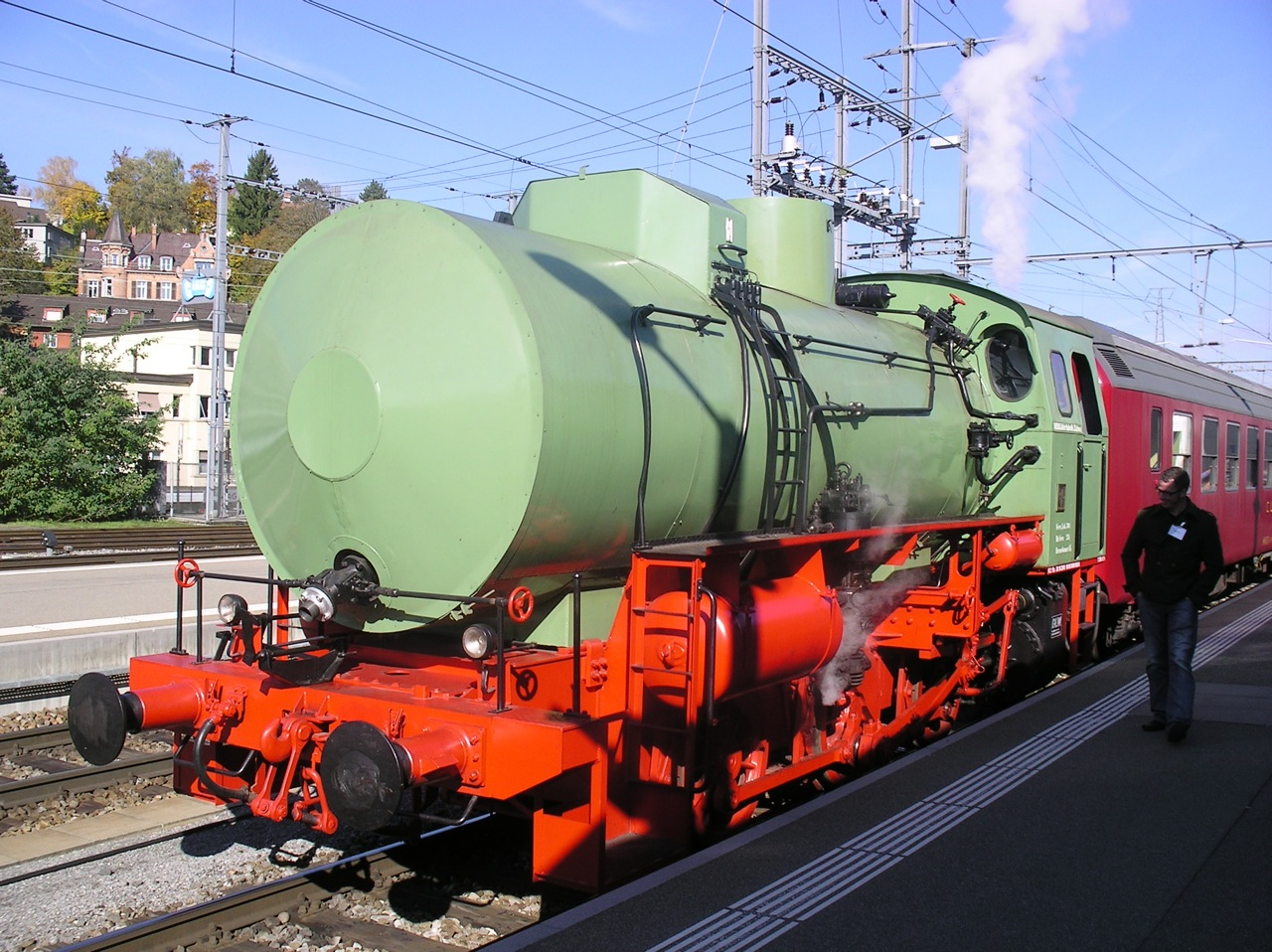
Fireless engine 002 of DLM, ready for industrial use at a demonstration in Schaffhausen 2010

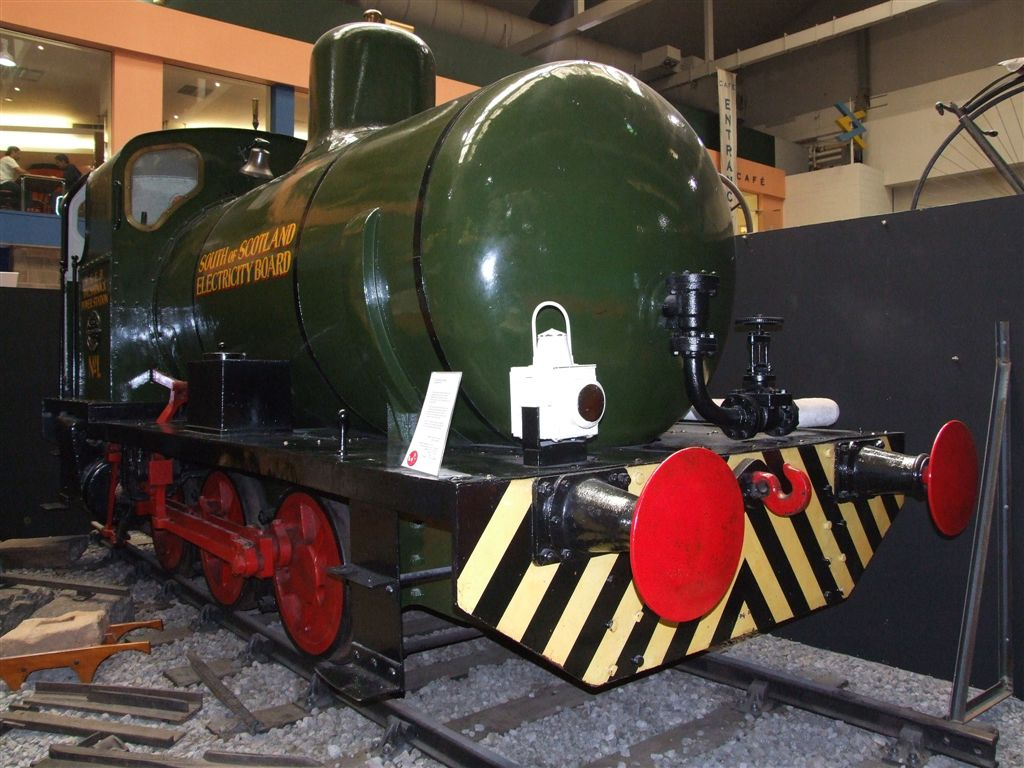
Andrew Barclay 0-6-0 South of Scotland Electricity Board, No. 1 at Glasgow Museum of Transport

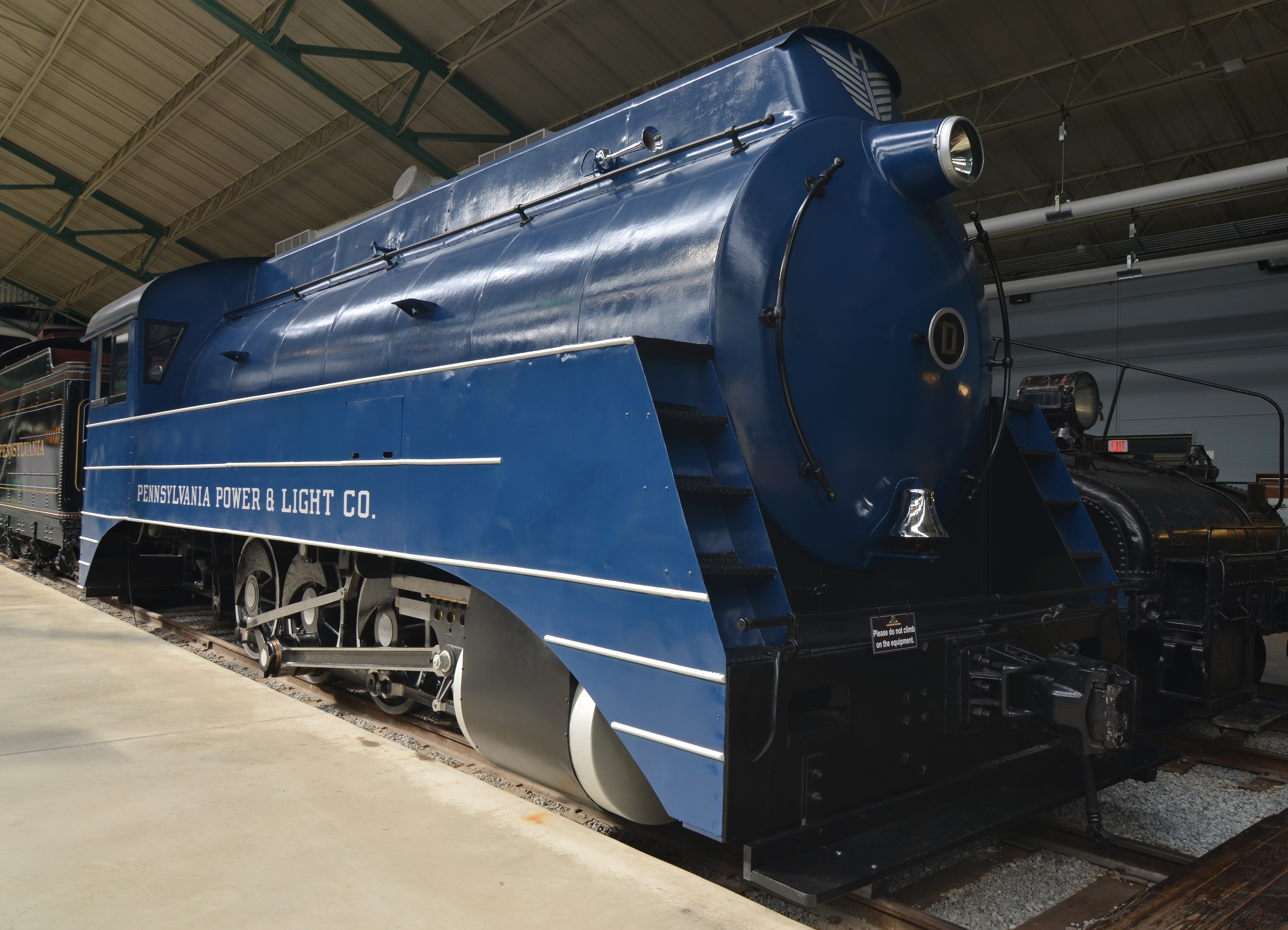
Pennsylvania Power and Light "D" at the Railroad Museum of Pennsylvania

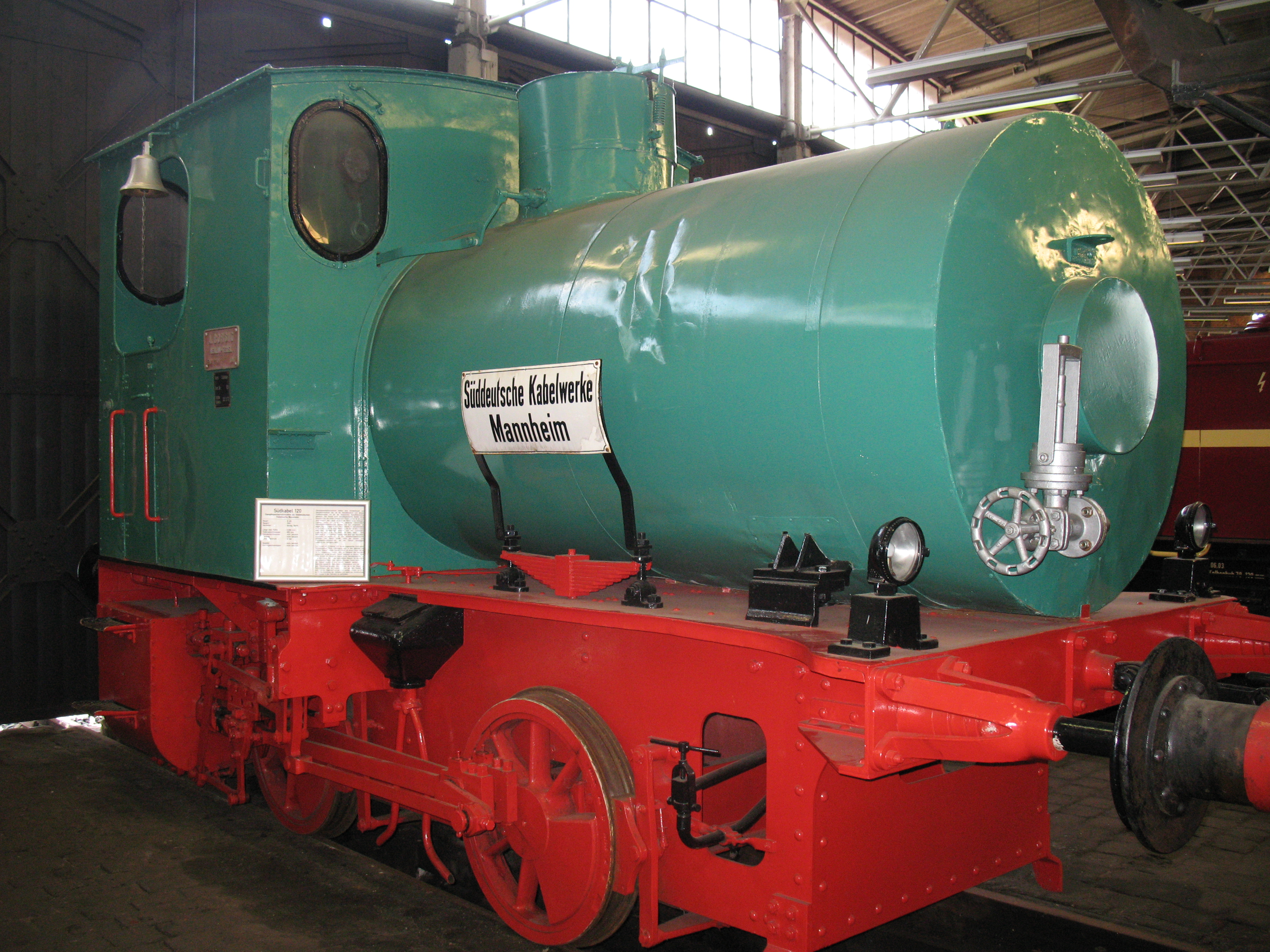
Fireless steam locomotive at railroad museum Bochum Dahlhausen, Germany

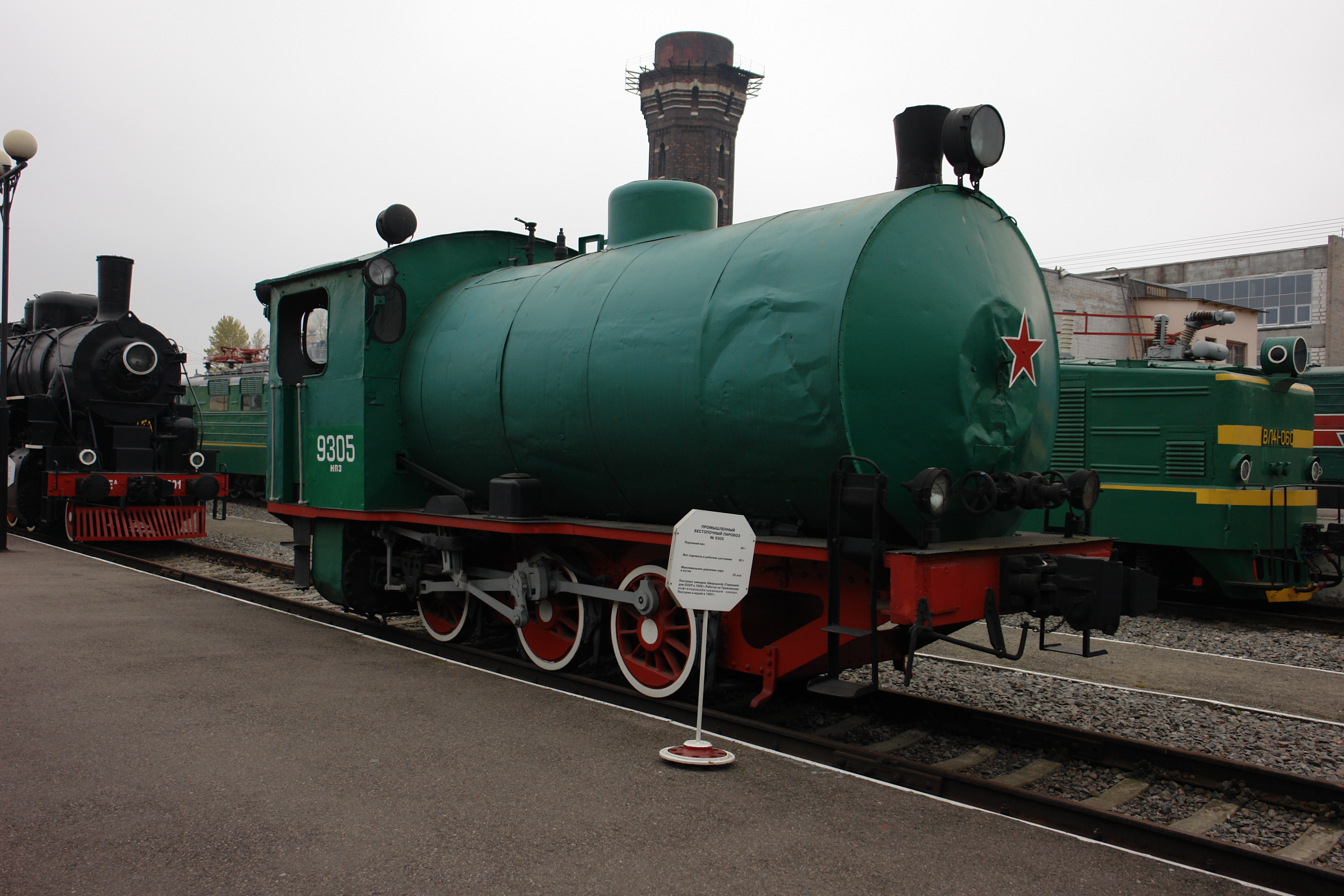
Industrial fireless locomotive No.9305 on display at Varshavsky railway station, St.Petersburg. Built in Germany in 1928

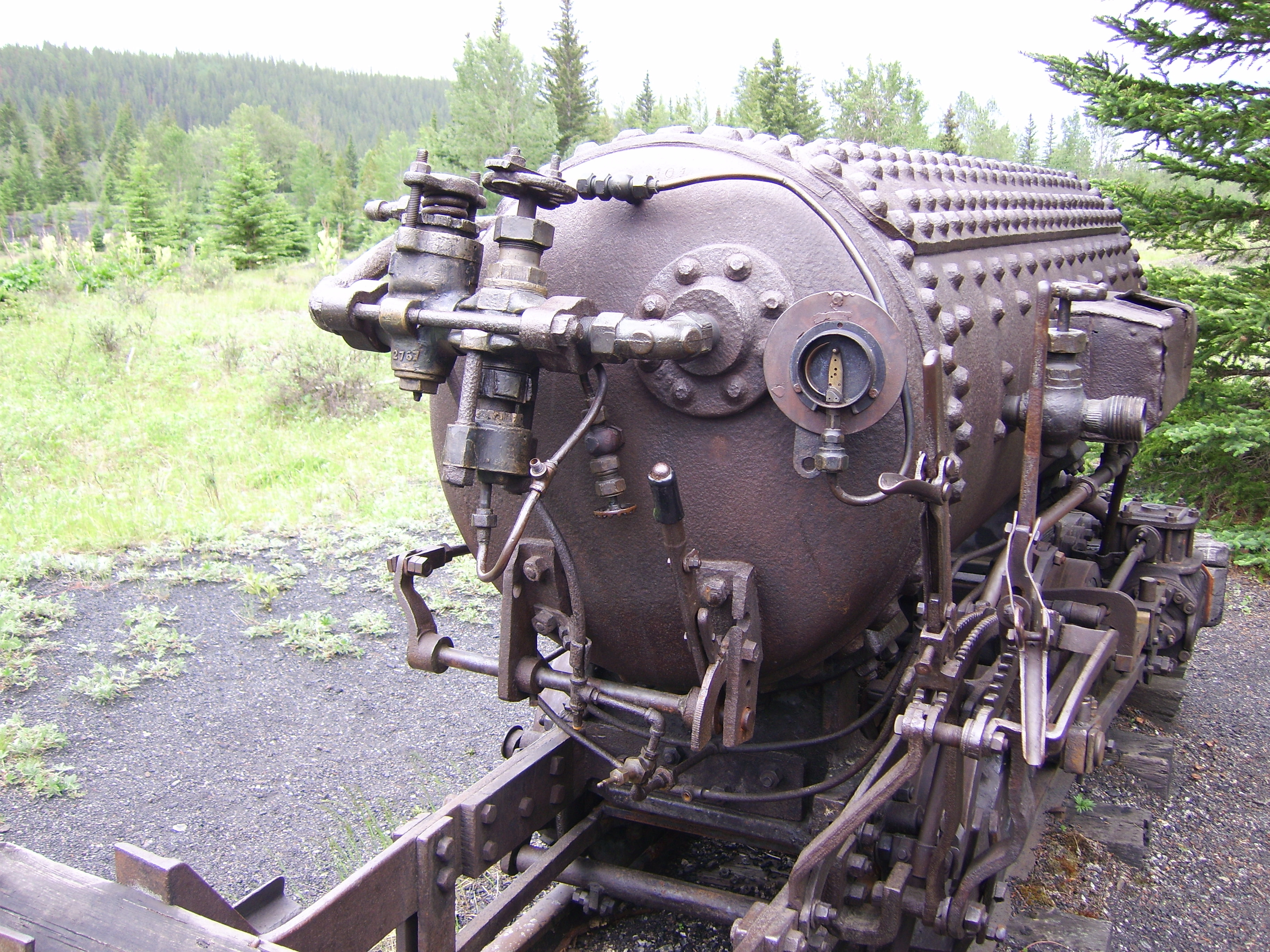
Compressed air locomotive at Bankhead, Alberta, Canada, formerly used in coal mining

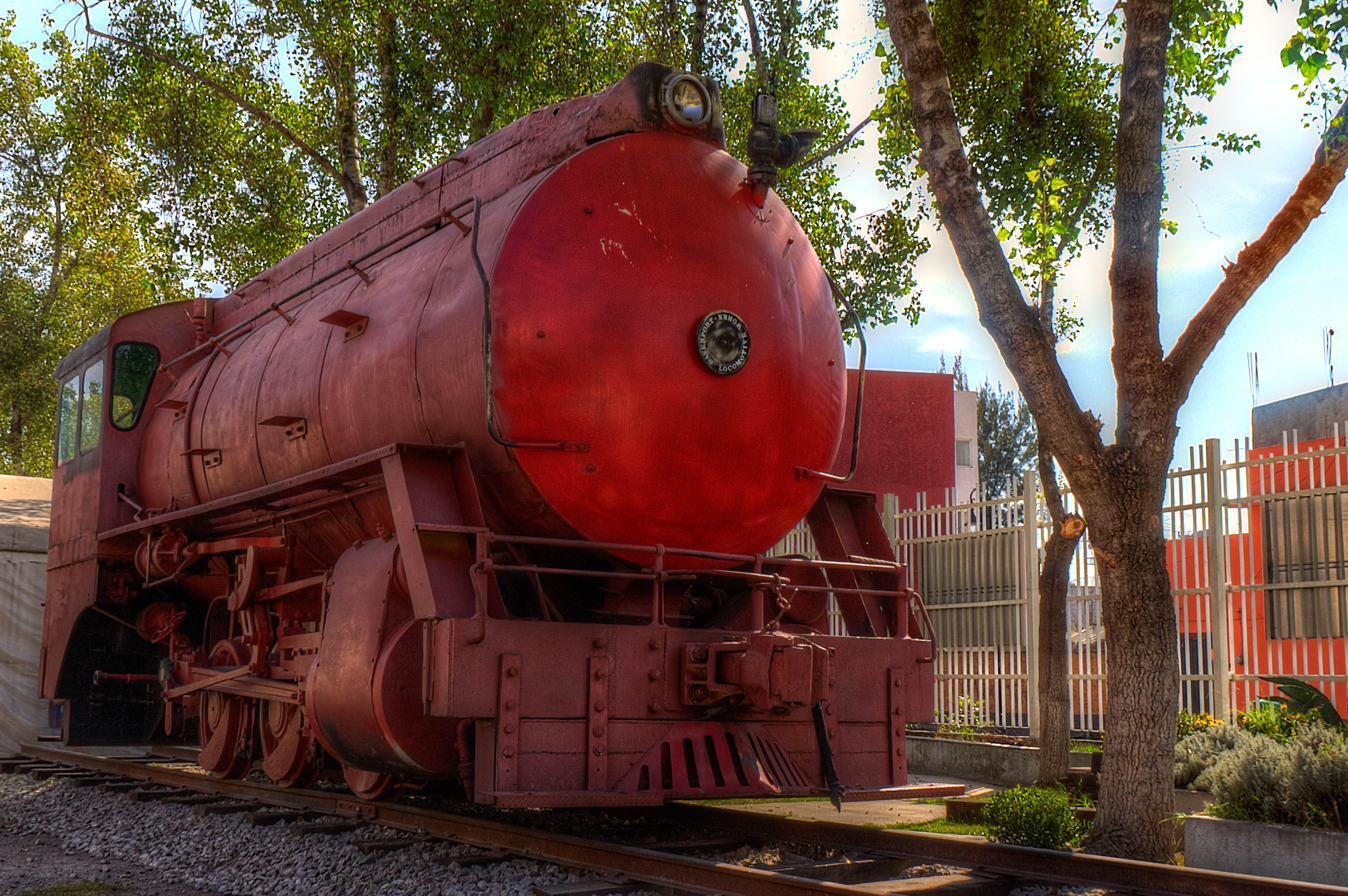
Fireless steam locomotive Davenport no. 013 "Sin Fuego" at Mexico City railroad museum

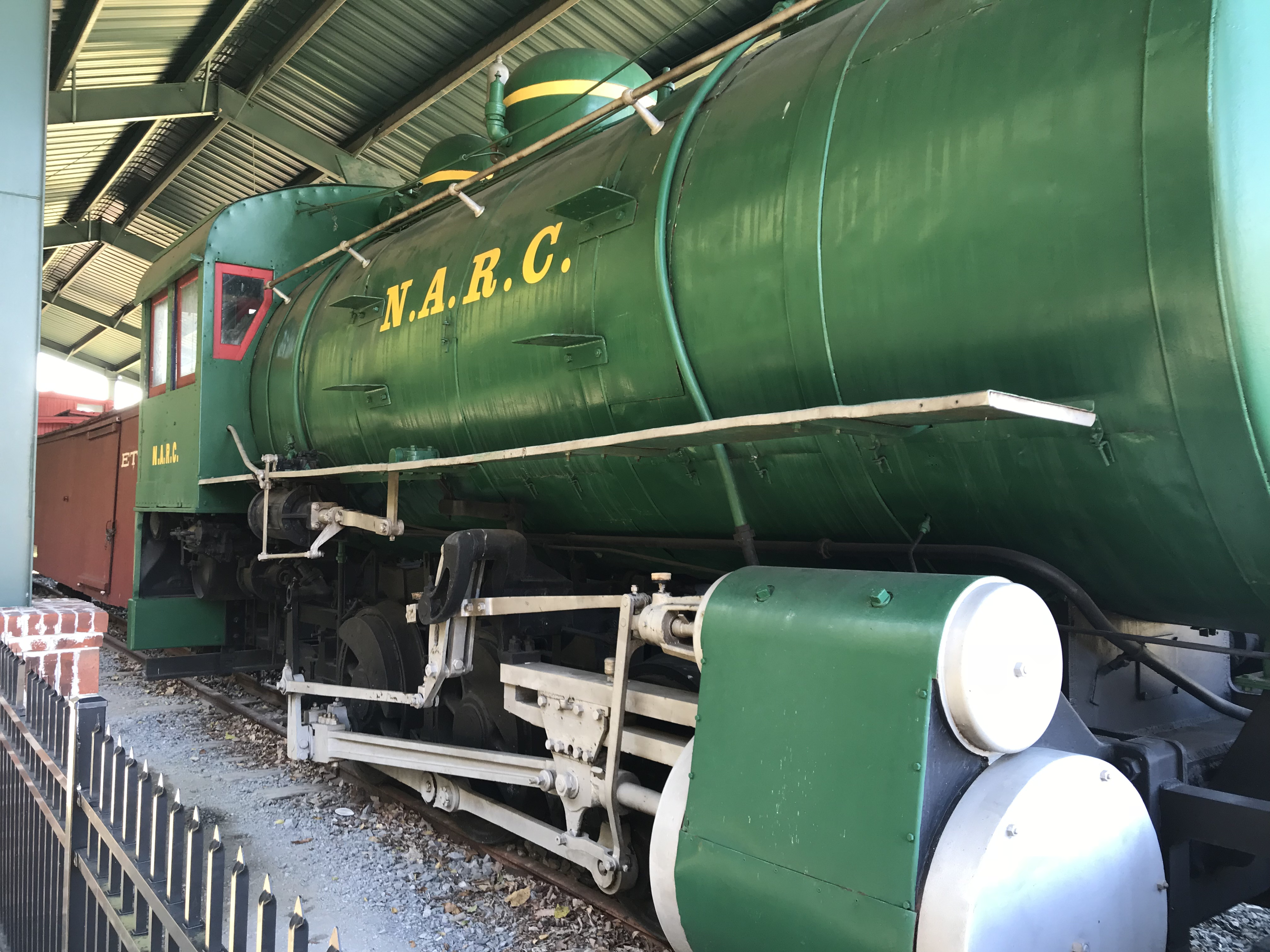
North American Rayon Corp 0-6-0F Fireless Locomotive

== See also ==
- Advanced steam technology
- Bagnall fireless locomotives (preserved)
- List of fireless steam locomotives preserved in Britain
- List of steam technology patents
