= GWR 813 Preservation Fund =

Heritage rail vehicle trust in Britain

The GWR 813 Preservation Fund is an organisation that was founded in 1966 to acquire, restore and preserve Port Talbot Railway No. 26 (GWR 813). It is based on the Severn Valley Railway.

== History ==
The Fund was formed in 1966 to purchase the last-known surviving Port Talbot Railway (No. 26, later GWR 813) steam locomotive from the National Coal Board. They purchased GWR 813 in 1967 and it was moved from Backworth Colliery the same year, later moving to the Severn Valley Railway. They are now currently based at the Severn Valley Railway and have a sales stand at Kidderminster.

=== GWR 813 ===
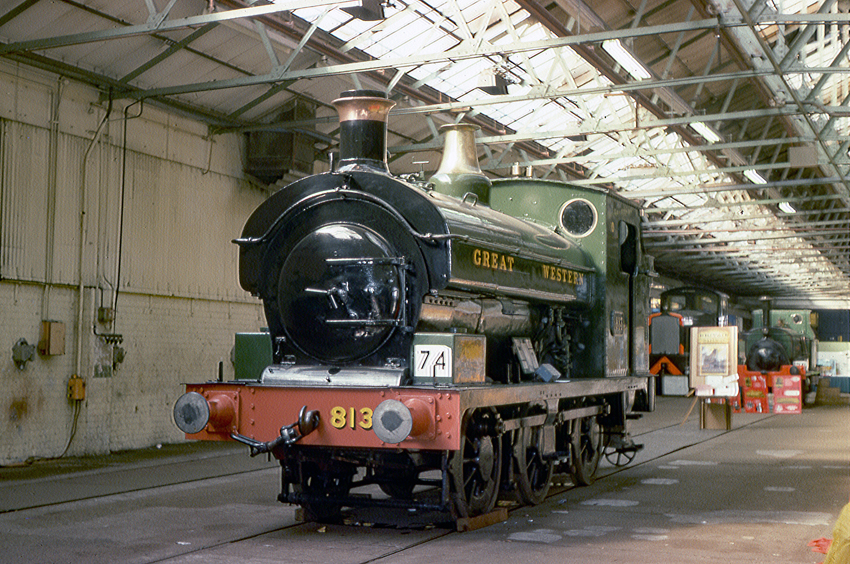
813 GWR 0-6-0ST on static display at Shildon 150

Port Talbot Railway No. 26 was built by Hudswell Clarke in 1901 along with five other locomotives. It was withdrawn in 1933 and then sold to Robert Stephenson & Company in 1934. Later it was sold to Backworth Colliery and re-numbered 12. It then became NCB 11 in 1950. The newly-formed GWR 813 Preservation Fund were looking to purchase this locomotive, it being the last of its kind. Offered for £320, then sold to the Preservation Fund in 1967. It was displayed as a static exhibit at the Rail 150 Celebrations in 1975. Mechanical faults prevented the locomotive from being fully operational for over a decade, although it steamed on a few occasions.

The trust fund got the locomotive fully operational in July 2000, when it was the only one in service at the time, at the time that many locomotives were reported to have boiler issues. After it was overhauled, from 2001 to 2009 the locomotive visited several heritage lines including Didcot, Dean Forest, Pontypool & Blaenavon, WSR, South Devon Rly, Vale of Glamorgan, etc. The '813 Fund' became a Charitable Incorporated Organisation on October 11, 2021. Registered Charity Number: 1196114.

== Owned stock ==
The GWR 813 Preservation Fund bought a covered van in 1968 to store parts for their locomotive, this was followed by the fund's interest in purchasing more ex-GWR stock. Today they own four coaches, and over 100 wagons of many types, in the collection is the only surviving ex-Brecon and Merthyr Railway open wagon.

=== Locomotives ===
| Number | Type | Current Location | Photograph | Notes |
|---|---|---|---|---|
| Port Talbot Railway No. 26 (GWR No. 813) | Port Talbot Railway 0-6-0ST | Severn Valley Railway | | Built in 1901. Acquired in 1967. Operational. Returned to traffic in November 2016. The oldest locomotive in operation on the SVR. (Boiler ticket expires in 2026). |

=== Carriages ===
| Number | Type | Current Location | Photograph | Notes |
|---|---|---|---|---|
| 98 | GWR 98 Hawksworth Full Brake 'Snake' | Severn Valley Railway | | Purchased direct from BR following withdrawal from service in 1977. |
| 215 | GWR 215 Dean 4-Wheeled 1st/2nd Composite | Gwili Railway | | Built in 1900. Acquired in 1985. |
| 1146 | GWR 1146 Collett Corridor Third | Severn Valley Railway | | Built in 1938. Operational. Part of ex-Swindon test train. |
| 4872 | GWR 4872 Collett Corridor Third Bow Ended | South Devon Railway | | Built in 1927. Acquired in 1984. Moved from the Severn Valley Railway in 2008. |

=== Brown (passenger rated) vehicles ===
| Number | Type | Current Location | Photograph | Notes |
|---|---|---|---|---|
| 55 | GWR 55 Breakdown Riding Van | Severn Valley Railway | | Built 1908 Lot 571 Acquired 1973 Allocated to Trowbridge - Westbury - Severn Valley Railway photo Gareth Price |
| 66 | GWR 66 Breakdown Tool Van | Severn Valley Railway | | Built 1921 Lot 864 Acquired 1985 Allocated to Taunton when built Then to Severn Valley Railway photo Gareth Price |
| 594 | GWR 594 Monster' Scenery Van | South Devon Railway | | Built in 1920. Diagram P18 Lot 1265 Acquired 1999 Enparts Vehicle 975789 photo Nick Baxter |
| 2303 | GWR 2303 Fruit Van | Severn Valley Railway | | Built 1898 Acquired 1973 |
| 2424 | GWR 2424 Fruit 'C' Fruit Van | Severn Valley Railway | | 6. Built 1911; Acquired 1986 |
| 2671 | GWR 2671 'Bloater' Fish Van | Didcot Railway Centre | | Built 1925 Acquired 1976 |
| 2862 | GWR 2862 Fruit 'C' Fruit Van. | Didcot Railway Centre | | Built 1939 Acquired 1980 |
| 2890 | GWR 2890 Siphon 'G' Bogie Milk Van | West Somerset Railway | | Built 1945 Acquired 1987 |
| 2988 | GWR 2988 Siphon 'G' Bogie Milk Van. | Dean Forest Railway | | Built 1945 Acquired 1982 |
| 58725 | Improvised Gunpowder Van | Severn Valley Railway | | Built 1896. Acquired 1977. |
| 105493 | 'Cone' Gunpowder Van | West Somerset Railway | | Built 1924. Acquired 1976. |

=== Covered goods vans ===
| Number | Type | Current Location | Photograph | Notes |
|---|---|---|---|---|
| 16307 | Mink 'A' Covered Goods Van | West Somerset Railway | | Built 1913. Acquired 1991. |
| 42239 | Grain Hopper Van | Didcot Railway Centre | | Built 1927. |
| 65620 | 'Vanfit' Covered Goods Wagon | Severn Valley Railway | | Built 1947. Acquired 1975. |
| 65801 | 'Mogo' Motor Car Van | Severn Valley Railway | | Built 1946. Acquired 1973. |
| 93016 | Mink 'A' Covered Goods Wagon | Severn Valley Railway | | Built 1914. Acquired 1972. |
| 93045 | Mink 'A' Covered Goods Van | Severn Valley Railway | | Built in 1914. Acquired 2008. |
| 95353 | Covered Goods Van | Severn Valley Railway | | Built in 1916. Ex-Rutland Railway Museum. |
| 101961 | Mink 'A' Covered Goods Van | Severn Valley Railway | | Built 1923. Acquired 1989. |
| 103592 | Mink 'A' Covered Goods Wagon | Severn Valley Railway | | Built in 1923. Acquired 1987. |
| 104621 | Mink 'A' Covered Goods Van | Severn Valley Railway | | Built 1924. Acquired 1971. |
| 112889 | Mink 'G' Covered Goods Wagon | Severn Valley Railway | | Built 1931. Acquired 1993. |
| 126359 | 'Mogo' Motor Car Van | South Devon Railway | | Built in 1934. |
| 126779 | Mink 'A' Covered Goods Van | West Somerset Railway | | Built 1936. Acquired in 1981. |
| 139760 | Mink 'A' Covered Goods Van | West Somerset Railway | | Built 1938. Acquired in 1991. |
| 145428 | Covered Goods Van | Didcot Railway Centre | | Built 1944. Acquired 1973. |

=== Water & Milk Tanks ===
| Number | Type | Current Location | Photograph | Notes |
|---|---|---|---|---|
| 102 | 6-Wheeled Water Tank Wagon | West Somerset Railway | | Built 1946. Acquired 1996. |
| 2016 | 6-Wheeled Milk Tank Wagon | South Devon Railway | | Built 1931. Acquired 1994. Originally 4-wheeled for United Dairies. |
| 2501 | 'Rotank' 6-Wheeled Road Milk Tank Flat Wagon | Evesham | | Built 1932. First such vehicle built by GWR. |
| 2504 | 6-Wheeled Milk Tank Wagon | Severn Valley Railway | | Built 1932. Acquired 1995. |
| 3018 | 6-Wheeled Milk Tank Wagon | West Somerset Railway | | Built 1946. Acquired 1994. |

=== Fruit Vans ===
| Number | Type | Current Location | Photograph | Notes |
|---|---|---|---|---|
| 82554 | Fruit 'B' Banana Van | Severn Valley Railway | | Built 1908. Acquired 1991. |
| 105565 | Fruit 'B' Banana Van | Evesham. | | Built in 1929. Acquired 1990. Body and underframe only. |

=== Meat Vans ===
| Number | Type | Current Location | Photograph | Notes |
|---|---|---|---|---|
| 105860 | Mica 'B' Refrigerated Meat Van | Didcot Railway Centre | | Built 1925. Acquired 1976. Photo: Edward Bull |
| 105873 | Mica 'B' Refrigerated Meat Van | Severn Valley Railway. | | Built 1925. Acquired 1973. |
| 105916 | Mica 'B' Refrigerated Meat Van | South Devon Railway | | Built 1925. Acquired 1978. |

=== Open Goods Wagons ===
| Number | Type | Current Location | Photograph | Notes |
|---|---|---|---|---|
| 10931 | Open 'A' 5-Plank Open Goods Wagon | Avon Valley Railway | | Built 1913. Acquired 1975. |
| 13154 | Open 'A' Open Goods Wagon. | Severn Valley Railway | | Built 1913. Acquired 1975. |
| 19818 | Open Goods Wagon | Didcot Railway Centre | | Built 1917. Acquired 1981. |
| 25190 | Open Goods Wagon | | | Built 1904. Acquired 1988. |
| 41277 | 4 Plank Open Wagon | Severn Valley Railway | | Built 1890. Acquired 1984. |
| 52137 | Open Goods Wagon | Evesham | | Built 1892. Acquired 1996. |
| 52243 | Open Goods Wagon | Avon Valley Railway | | Built 1896. Acquired 1996. |
| 75745 | Open Goods Wagon | Avon Valley Railway | | Built 1902. Acquired 1996. |
| 86582 | Open 'A' 5-Plank Open Wagon | Avon Valley Railway | | Built 1912. Acquired 1975. |
| 94059 | China Clay Open Goods Wagon | Severn Valley Railway | | Built 1914. Acquired 1975. |
| 97398 | Open 'A' 4-plank Open Goods Wagon | Severn Valley Railway | | Built 1921. Acquired 1970. |
| 98480 | Open 'A' Open Wagon | Severn Valley Railway | | Built 1921. Acquired 1981. |
| 99766 | Open 'A' 4 Plank Open Wagon | Severn Valley Railway | | Built 1902. Acquired 1990. Ex-Brecon & Merthyr Railway. |
| 99965 | Open 'C' Open Goods Wagon | Severn Valley Railway | | Built 1927. Acquired 1988. |
| 102691 | Open 'B' Open Goods Wagon | Severn Valley Railway | | Built 1924. Acquired 1985. |
| 108085 | 5 plank Open Goods Wagon | Severn Valley Railway | | Built 1924. |
| 108207 | 5-plank Open Goods Wagon | South Devon Railway | | Acquired 1982. |
| 117993 | Open Goods Wagon | Didcot Railway Centre | | Built 1931. Acquired 1981. |
| 135744 | Open 'A' 5-plank Open Goods Wagon | West Somerset Railway | | Built 1937. Acquired 1993. |
| 137696 | 5-plank Open Goods Wagon | West Somerset Railway | | Built 1938. Acquired 1993. |

=== Brake Vans ===
| Number | Type | Current Location | Photograph | Notes |
|---|---|---|---|---|
| 17464 | 20 Ton Goods Brake Van | Avon Valley Railway | | Built 1940 Diagram AA21 Lot 1370 Acquired 1994 |
| 68501 | 20 Ton Goods Brake Van | Severn Valley Railway | | Built 1925 Diagram AA15 Lot 932 Acquired 1971 |
| 68765 | 20 Ton Goods Brake Van | West Somerset Railway | | Built 1939 Diagram AA20 Lot 1277 Acquired 1988 |
| 68784 | 20 Ton Goods Brake Van | Avon Valley Railway | | Built 1939 Diagram AA20 Lot 1277 Acquired February 2016 |
| 114571 | 20 Ton Goods Brake van | West Somerset Railway | | Built 1934 Diagram AA20 Lot 1171 Acquired November 2021 |

=== Crated Glass Wagon ===
| Number | Type | Current Location | Photograph | Notes |
|---|---|---|---|---|
| 41723 | Coral 'A' Plated Glass Wagon | Didcot Railway Centre | | Built 1908. Acquired 1981. Awaiting restoration.. |

=== Boiler Truck ===
| Number | Type | Current Location | Photograph | Notes |
|---|---|---|---|---|
| 41945 | 'Crocodile G' Boiler Trolley | West Somerset Railway | | Built 1908. Acquired 1995. |

=== Machinery Trucks ===
| Number | Type | Current Location | Photograph | Notes |
|---|---|---|---|---|
| 41990 | Loriot 'Y' Machinery Flat Wagon | Severn Valley Railway | | Built 1939. Acquired 1994. |
| 42138 | Machinery Flat Wagon | Severn Valley Railway | | Built 1909. Acquired 1984. |
| 42272 | Loriot 'L' Machinery Flat Wagon | Severn Valley Railway | | Acquired 1981. |

=== Ballast Wagons ===
| Number | Type | Current Location | Photograph | Notes |
|---|---|---|---|---|
| 30903 | Ballast Wagon | Severn Valley Railway | | Built 1939. Acquired 1973. |
| 40841 | Ballast Wagon | Severn Valley Railway | | Built 1893. Acquired 1990. |
| 60562 | Ballast Wagon | Severn Valley Railway | | Built 1900. Acquired 1980. |
| 60906 | Ballast Wagon | Severn Valley Railway | | Built 1915. Acquired 1990. |
| 80646 | Ballast Wagon | Dean Forest Railway | | Built 1936. Acquired 1981. |
| 80669 | Ballast Wagon | West Somerset Railway | | Built 1936. Acquired 1988. |
| 80684 | Ballast Wagon | Severn Valley Railway | | Built 1936. Acquired 1984. |

== Rail & Timber Wagons ==
| Number | Type | Location | Photograph | Notes |
|---|---|---|---|---|
| 32337/8 | Single Bolster Wagons | Didcot Railway Centre | | Built 1881 Acquire 1994 |
| 32742 | Bogie Bolster Wagon | West Somerset Railway | | Built 1938 Acquired 1973 |
| 32822 | Bogie Bolster Wagon | West Somerset Railway | | Built 1939 Acquired 1990 |

| Number | Type | Location | Photograph | Notes |
|---|---|---|---|---|
| 60828 | Gane A Bogie Bolster Wagon | Dean Forest Railway | | Built 1937 Acquired 1982 |
| 84685 | Bogie Bolster Wagon | West Somerset Railway | | Built 1918 Acquired 1993 |

== Hand Cranes ==
| Number | Type | Location | Photograph | Notes |
|---|---|---|---|---|
| 264 | Hand Crane | West Somerset Railway | | Built 1908 Acquired 1982 |
| 446 | Hand Crane | Severn Valley Railway | | Built 1896 Acquired 1982 |
| 601 | Hand Crane | Kidderminster Museum | | Built 1892 Acquired 1982 |
| 603 | Hand Crane | Moreton-on-Lugg | | Built 1892 Ex Broad Gauge Acquired 1982 |

== Match Trucks ==
| Number | Type | Location | Photograph | Notes |
|---|---|---|---|---|
| 541 | Match Truck | West Somerset Railway | | Built 1884 Acquired 1982 |
| 603 | Match Truck | Moerton-on-Lugg | | Built 1883 Acquired 1982 |

== Tool Van & Workshop Van ==
| Number | Type | Location | Photograph | Notes |
|---|---|---|---|---|
| 16908 | Pooley Van | Honeybourne | | Built 1905 Acquired 1995 |
| 80982 | Workshop Van | Severn Valley Railway | | Built 1913 Acquired 1972 |

| Number | Type | Location | Photograph | Notes |
|---|---|---|---|---|
| 83831 | Loco Coal Wagon | Severn Valley Railway | | Built 1932 Acquired 1985 |

Cattle Wagon

| Number | Type | Location | Photograph | Notes |
|---|---|---|---|---|
| 106557* | Cattle Wagon Frame | West Somerset Railway | | Built 1937 Acquire 2021 Number and Diagram under investigation |
| 78 | BRW Cattle Wagon Chassis | West Somerset Railway | | Acquired 2021 Ex SRPS Bo'ness |

Grounded Body

| Number | Type | Location | Photograph | Notes |
|---|---|---|---|---|
| 37150 | Grounded Body | Severn Valley Railway | | Built 1892 Wooden Framed Mink |
