= List of steam technology patents =

List of steam technology patents. This is a list of patents relating to steam engines, steam locomotives, boilers, steam accumulators, condensers, etc.

== Belgian patents ==
- BE 904602 (A1), 1986, Boiler fed water heater - has flue gas closed-circuit heat exchanger contg. pure water with self-regulating operation

== British patents ==
- GB 189718087 (A), 1897, Improvements in means for providing for the free circulation of air in steam cylinders when the pistons are running and the steam cut off
- GB 189921940 (A), 1899, Improvements in feed water purifiers and heaters for steam generators
- GB 189922137 (A), 1899, Improvement in rotary steam engines
- GB 189923234 (A), 1899, Improvements in steam generators
- GB 190006487 (A), 1901, An improvement in starting valves for compound steam engines
- GB 190022906 (A), 1901, Improvements in valves for use in compound locomotives and other compound engines
- GB 190504645 (A), 1905, Improvements relating to the working of compound engines and in regulator valves therefor
- GB 190516372 (A), 1906, Improvements in valve gear for locomotives or similar coupled steam engines
- GB 190604729 (A), 1907, Improvements in locomotive superheaters
- GB 190605839 (A), 1907, Combined spark arrester and ash ejector for locomotive engines
- GB 191321689 (A), 1914, Improvements in and relating to power systems
- GB 125433 (A), 1919, Improvements in or relating to fireless steam locomotives and engines
- GB 235249 (A), 1925, Improvements in closed cycle steam power installations
- GB 446060 (A), 1936, Improvements in or relating to steam power plants comprising feedwater heaters and hot-water accumulators
- GB 446061 (A), 1936, Improvements in or relating to steam plants including hot-water accumulators
- GB 522279 (A), 1940, Improvements in or relating to plant for operating fireless locomotives
- GB 541689 (A), 1941, Improvements in or relating to steam generators
- GB 626087 (A), 1949, Improvements in or relating to the conversion of fired locomotives into fireless locomotives
- GB 629296 (A), 1949, Improvements in or relating to apparatus for electrically heating high-pressure steam generators or high-pressure steam accumulators
- GB 634497 (A), 1950, Improvements in or relating to fireless locomotives having high pressure steam accumulators
- GB 636122 (A), 1950, Improvements in or relating to charging cranes for fireless locomotives
- GB 637797 (A), 1950, Improvements in or relating to throttle valves for high-pressure steam accumulator fireless locomotives
- GB 639989 (A), 1950, Improvements in or relating to the arrangement of controls in the cabs of fireless locomotives
- GB 640235 (A), 1950, Improvements in or relating to high pressure steam accumulator locomotives
- GB 738935 (A), 1955, Fireless steam-driven vehicle
- GB 888793 (A), 1962, Solid fuel grates for locomotive fire boxes
- GB 929486 (A), 1963, Means for supplying solid fuel to locomotive fire boxes

== Canadian patents ==
- CA 2039935 (A1), 1992, Electrical steam locomotive

== French patents ==
- FR 2609152 (A1), 1988, Removable furnace body, burning poor-grade (lean) fuel, for an industrial generator

== German patents ==
- DE 4005467 (A1), 1990, Blast pipe for steam locomotive - has control systems for varying pipe opening
- DE 4311775 (A1), 1994, Feedwater-preheater construction for preheating temperatures above 100 deg C for steam generators, in particular locomotive-type boilers
- DE 19746384 (A1), 1999, Steam locomotive with steam storage boiler coupled to running gear, and used for shunting and industrial purposes

== Japanese patents ==
- JP 8144702 (A), 1996, Rotary steam engine

== Russian patents ==
- RU 2421619 (C1), 2011, Method of operating steam locomotive tandem compound steam engine

== US patents ==
- US 4425763 (A), 1984, Coal-fired steam locomotive
- US 4633818 (A), 1987, Mobile coal-fired fluidized bed power unit
- US 2011180024 (A1), 2011, Steam boiler with radiants
