= Scottish Industrial Railway Centre =

Heritage railway in Patna, Scotland

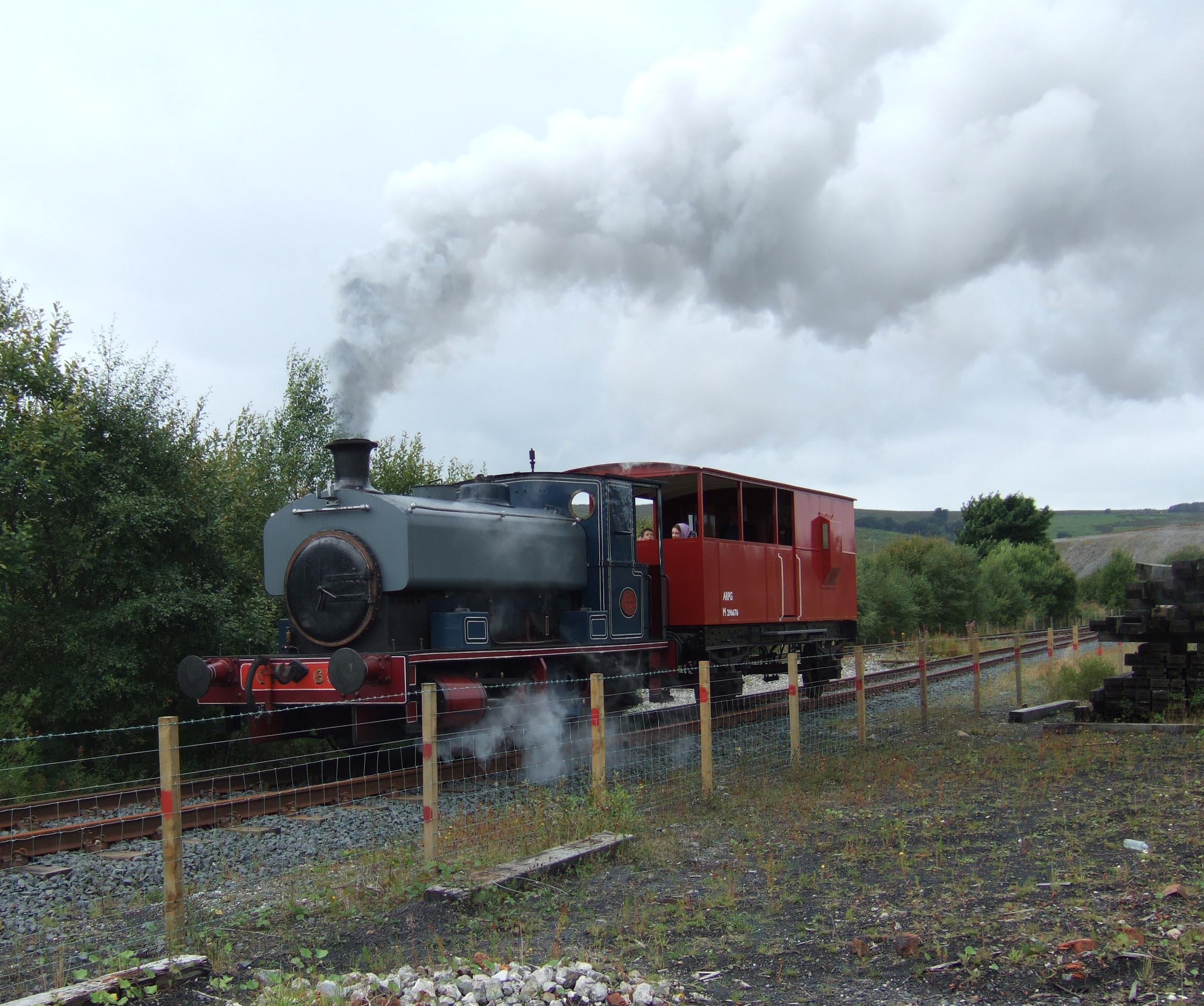
An Andrew Barclay saddle tank, normally resident at the Caledonian Railway (Brechin), operating on the centre's running line in 2005

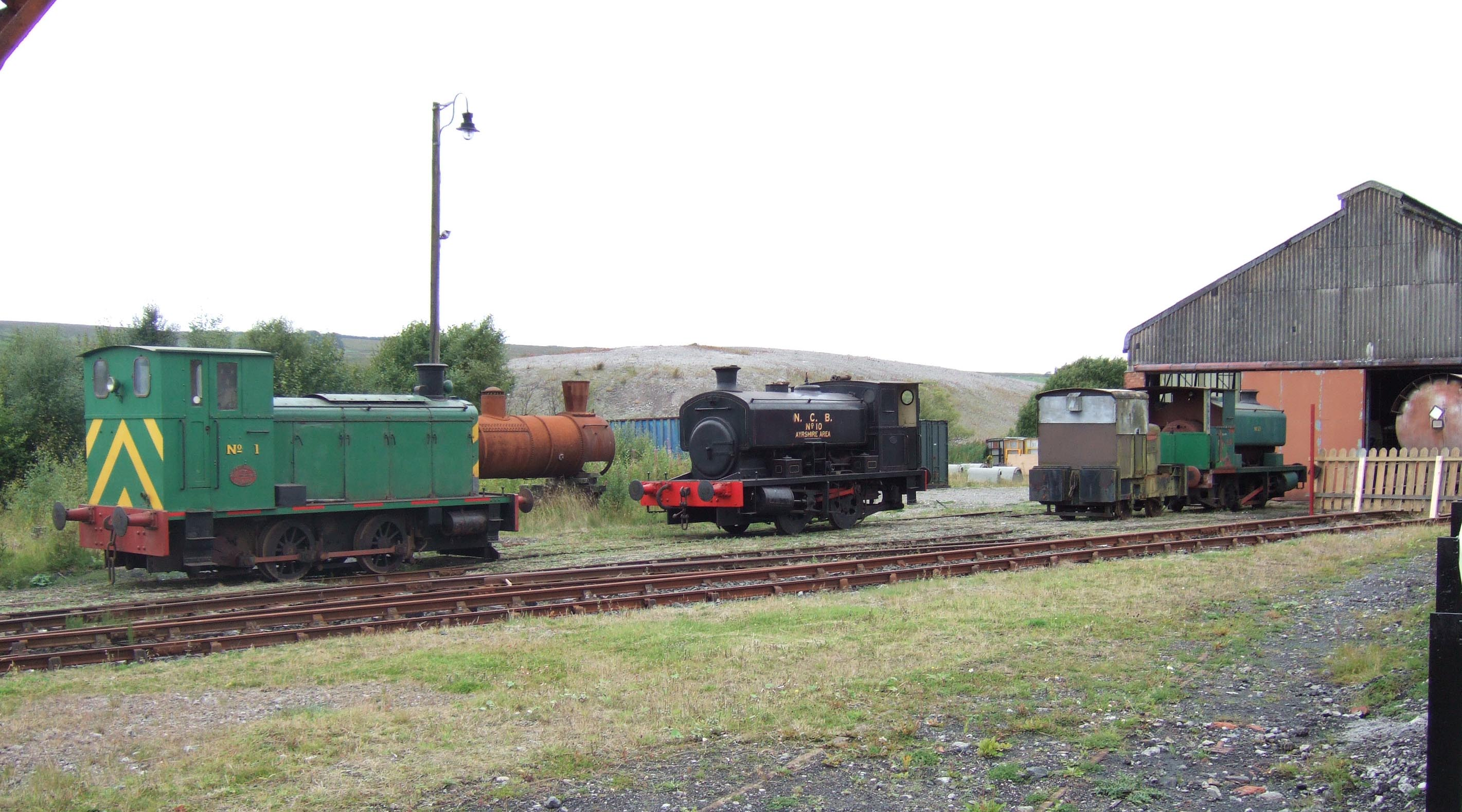
Locomotives outside the old NCB Waterside Shed

The Scottish Industrial Railway Centre is now the Doon Valley Railway which is an industrial heritage railway operated by the Ayrshire Railway Preservation Group (ARPG).

ARPG owns a number of standard gauge steam locomotives and diesel locomotives as well as some narrow gauge items and an extensive collection of photographs.

== History ==
The centre was based at the former Minnivey Colliery (grid reference NS474072), Dalmellington, East Ayrshire, Scotland, from 1980; but, following problems with the lease, the Group decided in 2002 to move the centre to the nearby Dunaskin Heritage Centre (NS441083).

During 2005 council funding was withdrawn from the Dunaskin Heritage Centre causing it to close, but the railway was still able to start running steam-hauled rides at the Dunaskin site, using a borrowed locomotive.

A lack of locomotive availability curtailed operations during 2006 and 2007 but, following the completion of the boiler swap and overhaul of Andrew Barclay 0-4-0ST N.C.B. No. 10, a series of successful steam days have been held since 2008. In 2023 the group were told that the buildings they use are to be sold.

This centre has now been reformed as the Doon Valley Railway (DVR) and ARPG are the management of this railway.

== Steam locomotives ==
The museum has a collection of Andrew Barclay Sons & Co. steam locomotives.

- Andrew Barclay 0-4-0ST N.C.B. No. 16. built in 1910. On display at Dunaskin
- Andrew Barclay 0-4-0ST N.C.B. No. 19. built in 1918. Stored out of use, partially cosmetically restored.
- Andrew Barclay 0-4-0F No. 8. built in 1928. Operational after its overhaul was completed in July 2015. Steam to operate the locomotive is provided by No. 10. One of only two operational Fireless locomotives in the UK (The other being at West Somerset Railway) and operates alongside No.10 on steam days.
- Andrew Barclay 0-4-0ST N.C.B. No. 10. built in 1947. Operational after swapping boilers with No. 19 and is now running after a boiler frailer in 2021.
- Andrew Barclay 0-4-0ST N.C.B. No. 23. built in 1949.Stored in a line of locos and rolling stock.
- Andrew Barclay 0-6-0ST N.C.B. No. 25. built in 1954.Awaiting restoration.
- Andrew Barclay 0-4-0ST N.C.B. No. 1. built in 1955.It will be a of the last steam locomotives to be restored.

== Diesel Locomotives ==
- Andrew Barclay Sons & Co. 0-4-0DM "Powfoot" No. 1. Operational and regularly performs shunting duties.
- Andrew Barclay 0-4-0DM No. 399. is nearly done with its overhaul and will be up and running for 2026.
- Hunslet Engine Company 0-4-0DM No. 107. Stored out of use.
- North British 0-4-0DH No. 277644 "Tees Storage". I will restored after No.399.
- Ruston and Hornsby 4wDM No. BE116. Stored out of use.
- Ruston and Hornsby 4wDM No. 324 "Blinkin Bess". Stored out of use.
- Ruston and Hornsby 4wDM No. 417890 "Johnnie Walker". Awaiting restoration.
- Ruston and Hornsby 0-4-0DM No. 421697. Stored out of use.
- Sentinel 4wDM No. 10012. Operational and regularly performs shunting duties.

== Rolling Stock ==
The centre is home to a wide variety of goods wagons including British Railways 16 ton mineral wagons and pallet vans, the latter having been formerly owned and operated by Scotch Whisky manufacturer Johnnie Walker. The railway has a London, Midland and Scottish Railway Inspection Saloon which has currently been repaired.
