= Sherburn =

Sherburn may refer to:

== Places ==
- Sherburn, County Durham, England
  - Sherburn Hill, a separate village to the east of Sherburn
  - Sherburn House, a hamlet to the south-west of Sherburn
  - Sherburn Hospital, a medieval hospital located at Sherburn House
- Sherburn, North Yorkshire, England
- Sherburn Rural District, East Riding of Yorkshire, England
- Sherburn in Elmet, North Yorkshire, England
- Sherburn, Minnesota, United States

== People ==
- Beth Sherburn (born 1991), English singer-songwriter
- George Sherburn (1884–1962), American scholar
- Sherburn M. Becker (1876–1949), American politician
- Sherburn Wightman (1882–1930), American football player and coach

== See also ==
- Sherburn railway station (disambiguation)
- Sherburne (disambiguation)
