= Leamside railway station =

Disused railway station in Leamside, County Durham

Leamside
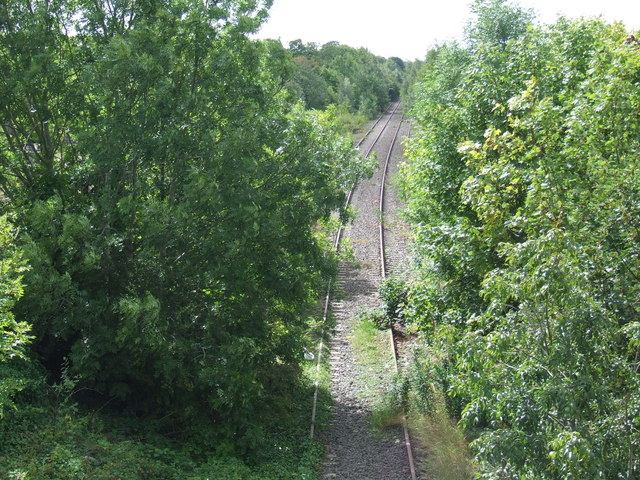
- The site of the station in 2011

General information
- Location: Leamside, County Durham; England
- Coordinates: 54.8119°N 1.5137°W
- Grid reference: NZ313464
- Platforms: 4

Other information
- Status: Disused

History
- Original company: Newcastle and Darlington Junction Railway
- Pre-grouping: North Eastern Railway
- Post-grouping: LNER; British Rail (North Eastern)

Key dates
- 15 April 1844: First station opened
- 1 April 1857: First station replaced by second station
- 5 October 1953: Second station closed and demolished
Location

Leamside railway station served the villages of Leamside and West Rainton, in County Durham, England from 1844 to 1953 on the Leamside line.

== History ==
The first station was opened on 15 April 1844 by the Newcastle and Darlington Junction Railway as an intermediate station on their route from Gilesgate and Ferryhill to the Durham Junction Railway at Rainton Crossing. The station was situated on the south side of Station Road bridge.

On 1 April 1857, the North Eastern Railway opened a line from Bishop Auckland to a junction with the former N&DJR south of the original Leamside station and, due to it becoming a junction station, decided to open a new, more suitable, Leamside station a short distance to south of the previous one. The freight facilities were on the up side with a goods shed. In 1913 NER statistics show that 11,128 tons of bricks and 21 wagons of livestock were handled at these goods facilities. Passenger booking plummeted from 61,571 to 5,968 in 1951. The station was closed to both passengers and goods traffic on 5 October 1953.

== Members of staff at Leamside ==
James Lowrie retired as Station master in 1909.

Robert Cochrane worked from 1857 to 1882, first as a Fireman and later as Signalman.

William Cowan worked as the Assistant Station Master from 1882 to 1904.

Preceding station	Disused railways	Following station
Belmont; Line and station closed	Newcastle and Darlington Junction Railway; Leamside line	Fencehouses; Line and station closed
Frankland; Line and station closed	North Eastern Railway; Leamside line	Fencehouses; Line and station closed
Sherburn Colliery; Line and station closed	North Eastern Railway; Leamside line	Fencehouses; Line and station closed
