= Sherburn railway station =

Sherburn railway station may refer to:

- Sherburn Colliery railway station in County Durham, England, originally opened as Sherburn
- Sherburn House railway station in County Durham, England, originally opened as Sherburn
- Sherburn-in-Elmet railway station in North Yorkshire, England
- Weaverthorpe railway station in North Yorkshire, England, originally opened as Sherburn
