= Hetton railway station =

Disused railway station in Hetton-le-Hole, Tyne and Wear

Hetton
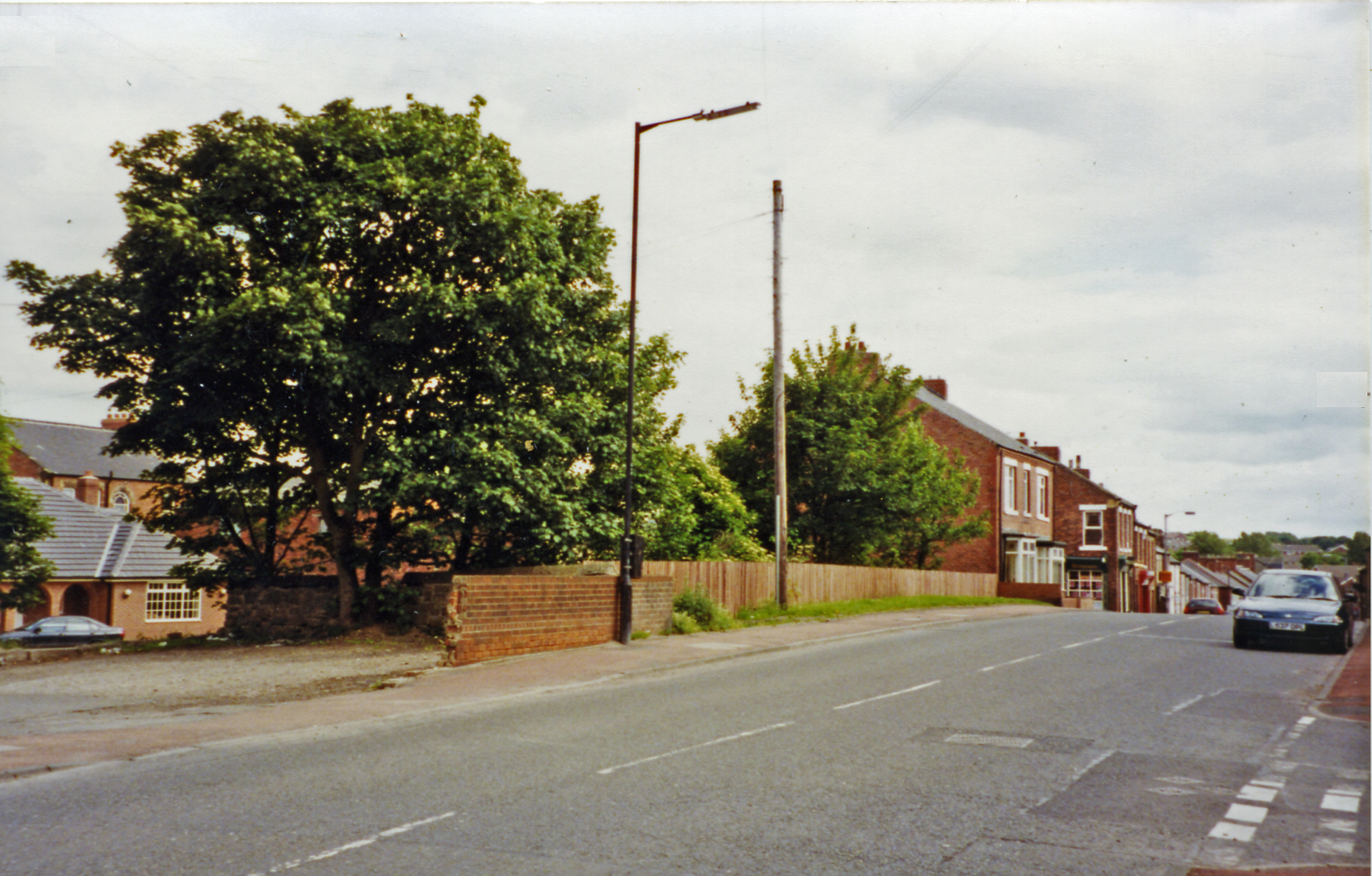
- The site of the station in 2002

General information
- Location: Hetton-le-Hole, Tyne and Wear; England
- Coordinates: 54.8175°N 1.4515°W
- Grid reference: NZ353470
- Platforms: 2

Other information
- Status: Disused

History
- Original company: Durham and Sunderland Railway
- Pre-grouping: North Eastern Railway
- Post-grouping: LNER; British Railways (North Eastern Region)

Key dates
- 6 November 1837: Opened
- 5 January 1953: Closed to passengers
- 11 November 1963: Closed to goods
Location

Hetton railway station served the town of Hetton-le-Hole, Tyne and Wear, England, from 1837 to 1963 on the Durham and Sunderland Railway.

== History ==
The station opened on 6 November 1837 on the Durham and Sunderland Railway. It was situated on the west side of Station Road. It closed to passengers on 5 January 1953 and closed to goods on 11 November 1963. It is now a cycle path that runs between Barrow-in-Furness and Sunderland.

Preceding station	Disused railways	Following station
Murton; Line and station closed	Durham and Sunderland Railway	Pittington; Line and station closed
