= Sherburn Colliery railway station =

Disused railway station in Sherburn, County Durham

Sherburn Colliery
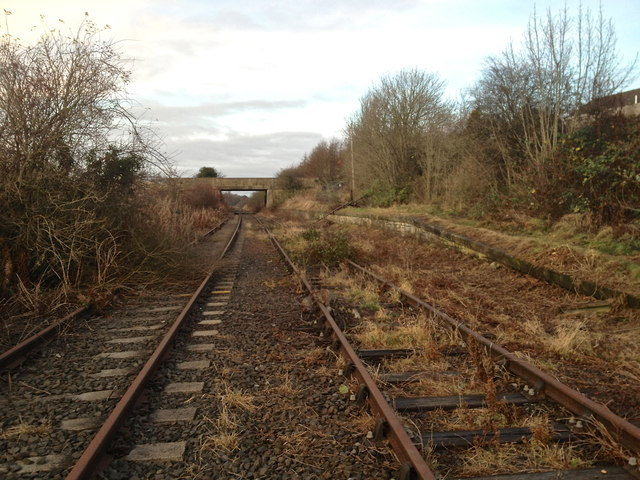
- The site of the station in 2012

General information
- Location: Sherburn, County Durham; England
- Coordinates: 54.7765°N 1.5133°W
- Grid reference: NZ314425
- Platforms: 2

Other information
- Status: Disused

History
- Original company: Newcastle and Darlington Junction Railway
- Pre-grouping: North Eastern Railway
- Post-grouping: LNER

Key dates
- 19 June 1844: Opened as Sherburn
- 1 April 1874: Renamed Sherburn Colliery
- 28 July 1941: Closed to passengers
- 14 September 1959: Closed completely
Location

Sherburn Colliery railway station served the village of Sherburn, County Durham, England from 1844 to 1959 on the Leamside line.

== History ==
The station opened as Sherburn on 19 June 1844 by the Newcastle and Darlington Junction Railway. The station was situated on the north side of the road bridge over the railway on Front Street, part of the B1283. Due to having two stations named Sherburn, the North Eastern Railway renamed this as Sherburn Colliery whilst Sherburn station the station on the Durham to Sunderland Line became Sherburn House. The goods facilities were south of the road bridge and east of the through lines. The 1913 NER statistics showed that barley and livestock were the principal goods handled at the station. Although the LNER intended to close the station in 1939, passenger services continued until 28 July 1941. The only services after passenger closure were excursions, including a school trip in 1951. The station closed to goods traffic on 14 September 1959.

Preceding station	Disused railways	Following station
Shincliffe; Line and station closed	Newcastle and Darlington Junction Railway; Leamside line	Belmont; Line and station closed
