= Belmont Junction railway station (Durham) =

Disused railway station in Belmont, Country Durham

Belmont Junction
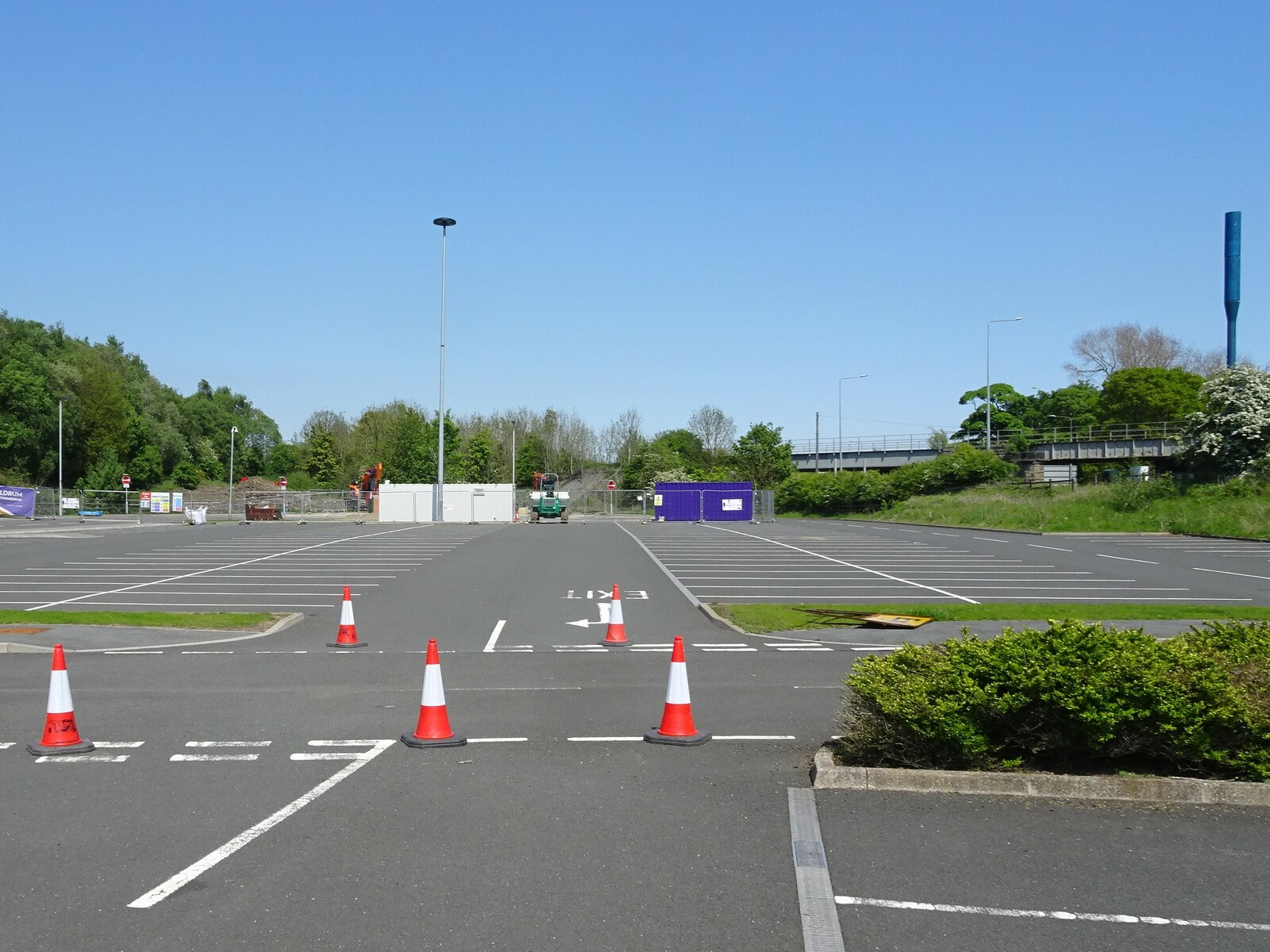
- The site of the station in 2021

General information
- Location: Belmont, County Durham; England
- Coordinates: 54.7972°N 1.5206°W
- Grid reference: NZ309448
- Platforms: 2

Other information
- Status: Disused

History
- Original company: Newcastle and Darlington Junction Railway
- Pre-grouping: York, Newcastle and Berwick Railway; North Eastern Railway

Key dates
- 15 April 1844: Opened as Belmont
- 1852: Renamed Belmont Junction
- 1 April 1857: Closed completely
Location

Belmont Junction railway station was a railway station that served the civil parish of Belmont in County Durham, North East England, from 1844 to 1857. It was located at the junction between the main line and Gilesgate branch of the Newcastle and Darlington Junction Railway.

== History ==
The station opened as Belmont on 15 April 1844 by the Newcastle and Darlington Junction Railway. It was situated north of the railway bridge over the A690, close to junction 62 of the A1. The station name was changed to Belmont Junction in 1852. The station ceased to have a purpose when the North Eastern Railway opened its branch from Leamside to Bishop Auckland, on which the present day Durham station is located. This station is far closer to the centre of Durham than the former station at Gilesgate was and thus the Gilesgate branch and Belmont Junction closed to all traffic on 1 April 1857.

Preceding station	Disused railways	Following station
Durham (Gilesgate); Line and station closed	Newcastle and Darlington Junction Railway; Leamside line	Leamside; Line and station closed
Sherburn Colliery; Line and station closed	Newcastle and Darlington Junction Railway; Leamside line	Leamside; Line and station closed
