= Durham (Gilesgate) railway station =

Disused railway station in Gilesgate, County Durham

Durham (Gilesgate)
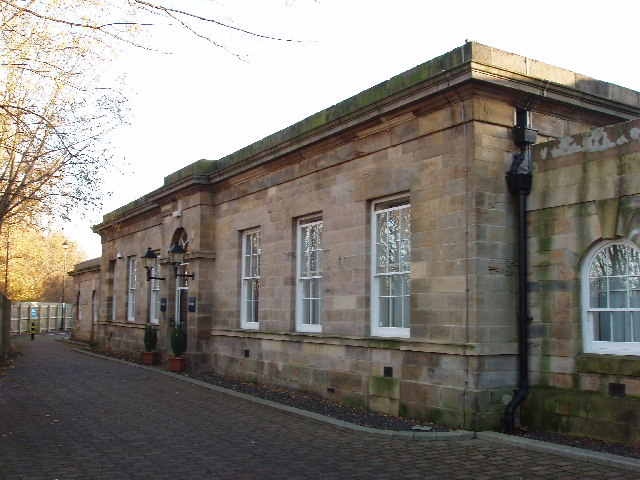
- The site of the station in 2005

General information
- Location: Gilesgate, County Durham; England
- Coordinates: 54.7787°N 1.563°W
- Grid reference: NZ282427
- Platforms: 1

Other information
- Status: Disused

History
- Original company: Newcastle and Darlington Junction Railway
- Pre-grouping: North Eastern Railway
- Post-grouping: LNER; British Rail (North Eastern)

Key dates
- 15 April 1844: Opened
- 1 April 1857: Closed to passengers
- 17 November 1966: Closed completely
Location

Durham (Gilesgate) railway station (when in passenger use known simply as Durham and later also as Durham Goods) served the Gilesgate area of Durham City in County Durham, North East England from 1844 to 1857 as the terminus of the Newcastle & Darlington Junction Railway Durham Branch passenger service (later to be incorporated into the Leamside line). Its life as a passenger station was short and it was quickly converted to goods station, a role which it played for more than a century.

== History ==
The station opened on 15 April 1844 by the Newcastle and Darlington Junction Railway. It was adjacent to Gilesgate and Station Lane. This was the second of four railway stations built to serve Durham City, the first being Shincliffe (later being renamed Shincliffe Town) on the Durham and Sunderland Railway. Due to the inconvenient site of the station, it had a short lifespan, only being open for 13 years before closing to passengers on 1 April 1857, although it remained open for goods traffic. In the 1898 map the station was called Durham and Belmont - Goods Trains and in the 1913 Railway Clearing House map it was referred to as Durham Goods. There was a trainshed to the southeast of the platform with a pair of carriage sidings. A wooden goods shed joined the trainshed and had one single line going into it. Kepier Colliery was nearby which closed in the 1920s. The station closed to goods traffic on 17 November 1966 and the tracks were quickly lifted. The station building is now a Travelodge.

Preceding station	Disused railways	Following station
Terminus	Newcastle & Darlington Junction Railway; Durham Branch	Belmont; Line and station closed
