= Aycliffe railway station =

Disused railway station in Aycliffe, County Durham, England

Coordinates: 54.596°N 1.559°W

Aycliffe
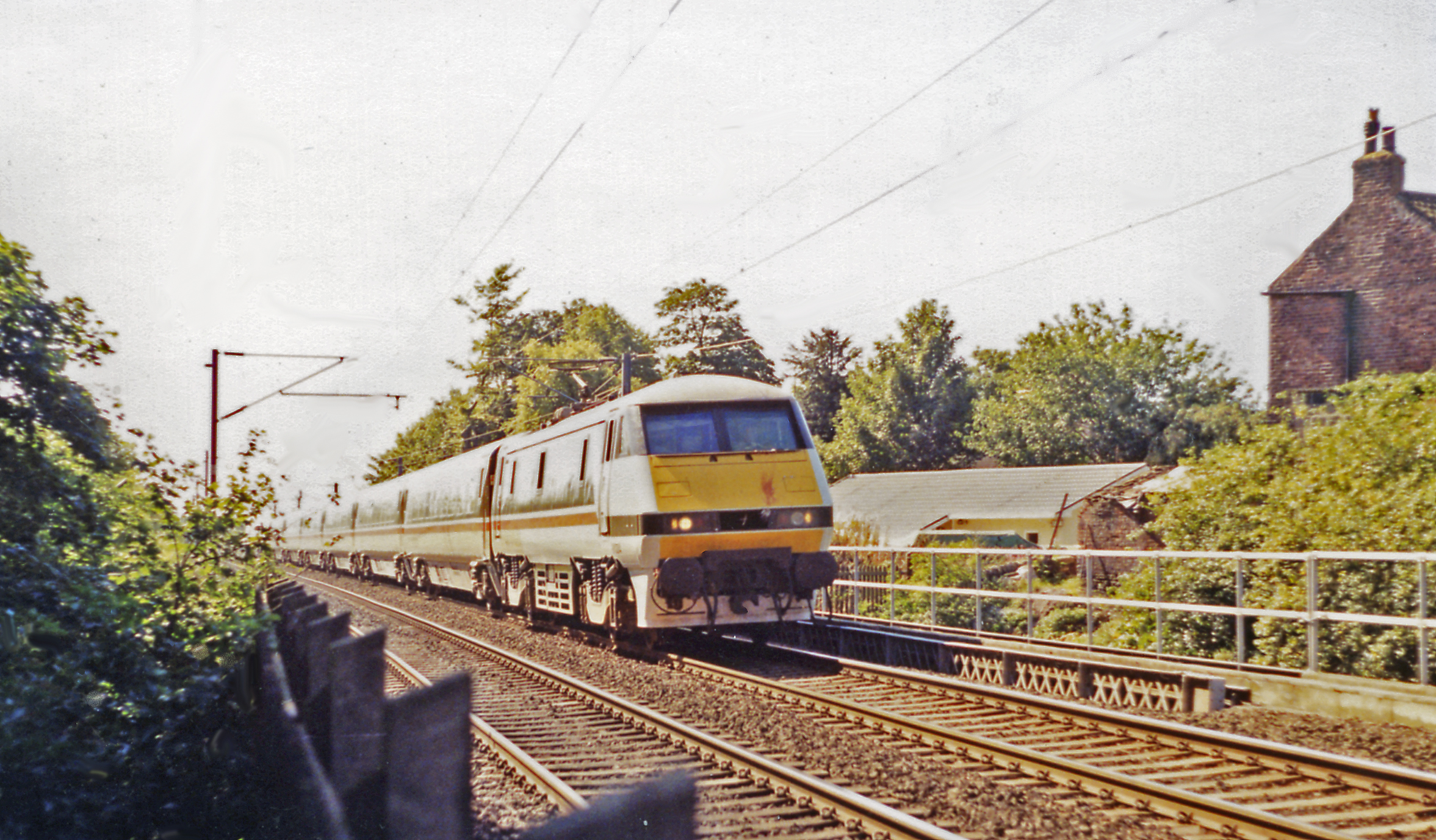
- Site of the station in 1991

General information
- Location: Aycliffe, County Durham; England
- Platforms: 2

Other information
- Status: Disused

History
- Original company: Newcastle and Darlington Junction Railway
- Pre-grouping: North Eastern Railway
- Post-grouping: London and North Eastern Railway

Key dates
- 19 June 1844: Station opened
- 2 March 1953: Station closed
Location

Aycliffe railway station served the village of Aycliffe in County Durham, England. The railway station was served by trains on the East Coast Main Line between Darlington and Durham.

== History ==
Opened by the Newcastle and Darlington Junction Railway, and then the North Eastern Railway, it became part of the London and North Eastern Railway during the Grouping of 1923, passing on to the Eastern Region of British Railways during the nationalisation of 1948. It was then closed by British Railways.

== The site today ==
Trains still pass at speed on the now electrified East Coast Main Line.

Preceding station	Historical railways	Following station
Darlington Bank Top; Line and station open	North Eastern Railway; East Coast Main Line	Bradbury; Line open, station closed
