= Leamside =

Coordinates: 54.815°N 1.515°W

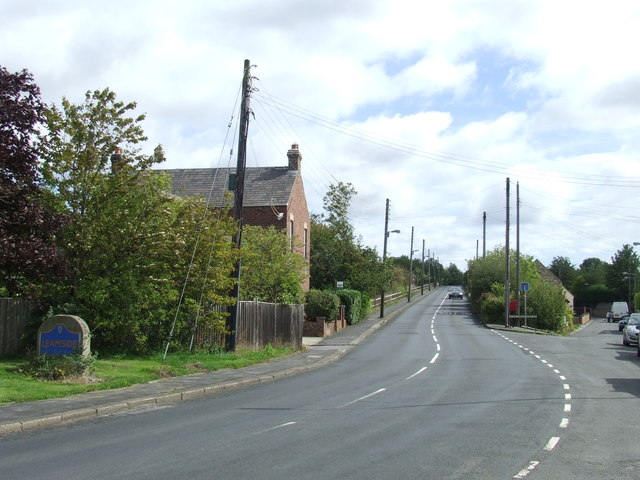
- Station Road

- Location within County Durham
- Population: 112
- OS grid reference: NZ311467
- Unitary authority: County Durham
- Ceremonial county: County Durham
- Region: North East
- Country: England
- Sovereign state: United Kingdom
- Post town: HOUGHTON LE SPRING
- Postcode district: DH4
- Dialling code: 0191
- Police: Durham
- Fire: County Durham and Darlington
- Ambulance: North East
- UK Parliament: City of Durham

Leamside is a small village close to the city of Durham, County Durham, in England. It is situated to the west of West Rainton. It is part of the civil parish of West Rainton. There is one restaurant, a plant nursery, and some livery stables, but there are no other community or commercial entities.

== Notable residents ==
- Edward Fenwick Boyd (1810–1889), industrialist who built and lived in Moor House in the village
- Janet Boyd (1850–1928), militant suffragette

== See also ==
- Leamside railway station
