= Frankland railway station =

Disused railway station in Brasside, County Durham

Frankland

General information
- Location: Brasside, County Durham; England
- Coordinates: 54.8012°N 1.5519°W
- Grid reference: NZ289452
- Platforms: 2

Other information
- Status: Disused

History
- Original company: North Eastern Railway
- Pre-grouping: North Eastern Railway

Key dates
- March 1861: Opened
- July 1877: Closed
Location

Frankland railway station served the village of Brasside, County Durham, England, from 1861 to 1877 on the Leamside Line.

== History ==
The station opened in March 1861 on the North Eastern Railway. It was situated south of where Frankland Prison is today. It was known as Frankland Siding from 1861 to 1868 in the Bradshaw timetables. Goods trains served a nearby colliery as well as a brick works. Trains only ran on Saturdays until towards the end until it became fortnightly and closed in July 1877.

Preceding station	Historical railways	Following station
Leamside; Line and station closed	Leamside Line; North Eastern Railway	Durham; Line open, station closed
