= Sherburne =

Sherburne may refer to:

== People with the surname ==
- Edward Sherburne (1618–1702), English poet, translator, and Royalist
- Henry Sherburne (1611–1680), early settler in Portsmouth, New Hampshire
- Henry Sherburne (colonel) (1748-1824), officer in the Continental Army during the American Revolution
- John C. Sherburne (1883-1959), attorney and judge from Vermont
- John Samuel Sherburne (1757–1830), politician from New Hampshire
- Moses Sherburne (1808–1868), jurist and politician from Maine and Minnesota

== Places ==
- Sherburne, Kentucky, an unincorporated community
- Sherburne County, Minnesota, a county in the central part of the state
- Sherburne (town), New York, a town in Chenango County, and Sherburne (village), New York, a village therein
- Sherburne National Wildlife Refuge, Minnesota
- Lake Sherburne, Montana
- Killington, Vermont (formerly known as Sherburne), a ski resort town in Vermont

== Other uses ==
- USS Sherburne (APA-205)
- A well-known melody from the Sacred Harp, to which the lyric, "While Shepherds Watched Their Flocks by Night", by Nahum Tate, may be sung

== See also ==
- Henry Sherburne House, ca, 1766-1770, in Portsmouth, New Hampshire
- Sherburn (disambiguation)
