= Sherburn House railway station =

Disused railway station in Sherburn House, County Durham

Sherburn House
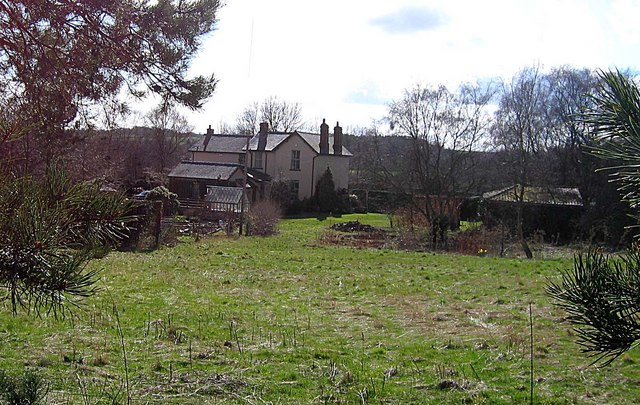
- Site of the station in 2008

General information
- Location: Sherburn House, County Durham; England
- Coordinates: 54.7697°N 1.5283°W
- Grid reference: NZ304417
- Platforms: 2

Other information
- Status: Disused

History
- Original company: Durham and Sunderland Railway
- Pre-grouping: North Eastern Railway
- Post-grouping: LNER

Key dates
- 1837: First station opened as Sherburn
- 1 April 1874: First station renamed Sherburn House
- 24 April 1893: Second station replaces first station
- 1 January 1931: Second station closed to passengers
- 11 January 1954: Second station closed completely
Location

Sherburn House railway station served the hamlet of Sherburn House and the village of Sherburn, County Durham in England from 1837 to 1931 on the Durham to Sunderland Line.

== History ==
The first station opened was as Sherburn in 1837 by the Durham and Sunderland Railway. It served as the temporary terminus of their line from Sunderland Town Moor until the line reached its intended terminus at Shincliffe Town station in Shincliffe on 28 June 1839. The station was renamed Sherburn House on 1 April to avoid confusion with another Sherburn station which was renamed Sherburn Colliery on the same day.

On 24 July 1893, the North Eastern Railway (by then the owners of the Durham to Sunderland line) opened a line from the original Sherburn House station to a new terminus at Durham Elvet which was much closer to Durham City than the original D&SR terminus in Shincliffe and as a consequence the line to Shincliffe Town was closed. At the same time as the opening of the line to Durham Elvet, the original station at Sherburn House was replaced by a new station on the Elvet branch. The second station was situated on the west side of the A181. The passenger service to Elvet was unsuccessful, thus regular passenger services were withdrawn on 1 January 1931. The station was still used for one day a year (except the war years) until 11 January 1954, when the station closed to all traffic.

Preceding station	Disused railways	Following station
Shincliffe Town; Line and station closed	Durham and Sunderland Railway; Durham to Sunderland Line	Pittington; Line and station closed
Durham Elvet; Line and station closed	North Eastern Railway; Durham to Sunderland Line	Pittington; Line and station closed
