= Bradbury railway station =

Disused railway station in Bradbury, County Durham

Bradbury
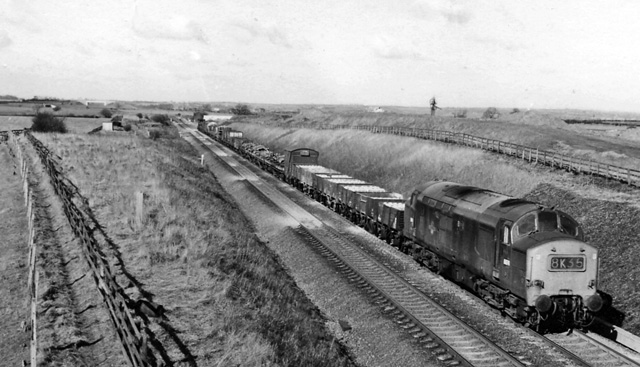
- The site of the station, looking north towards Ferryhill, in 1970

General information
- Location: Bradbury, County Durham; England
- Coordinates: 54.6488°N 1.5025°W
- Grid reference: NZ322283
- Platforms: 2

Other information
- Status: Disused

History
- Original company: North Eastern Railway
- Pre-grouping: North Eastern Railway
- Post-grouping: LNER

Key dates
- 19 June 1844: Opened
- 2 January 1950: Closed
Location

Bradbury railway station served the village of Bradbury, County Durham, England from 1844 to 1950 on the East Coast Main Line.

== History ==
The station opened on 19 June 1844 by the North Eastern Railway. It closed to both passengers and goods traffic on 2 January 1950.

Preceding station	Historical railways	Following station
Aycliffe; Line open, station closed	North Eastern Railway; East Coast Main Line	Ferryhill; Line open, station closed
