= Durham–Sunderland line =

Disused railway line in England

Coordinates: 54.773°N 1.565°W

The Durham–Sunderland line was a railway line in the North East of England. The line no longer exists, but many features along its path are still visible.

== History ==
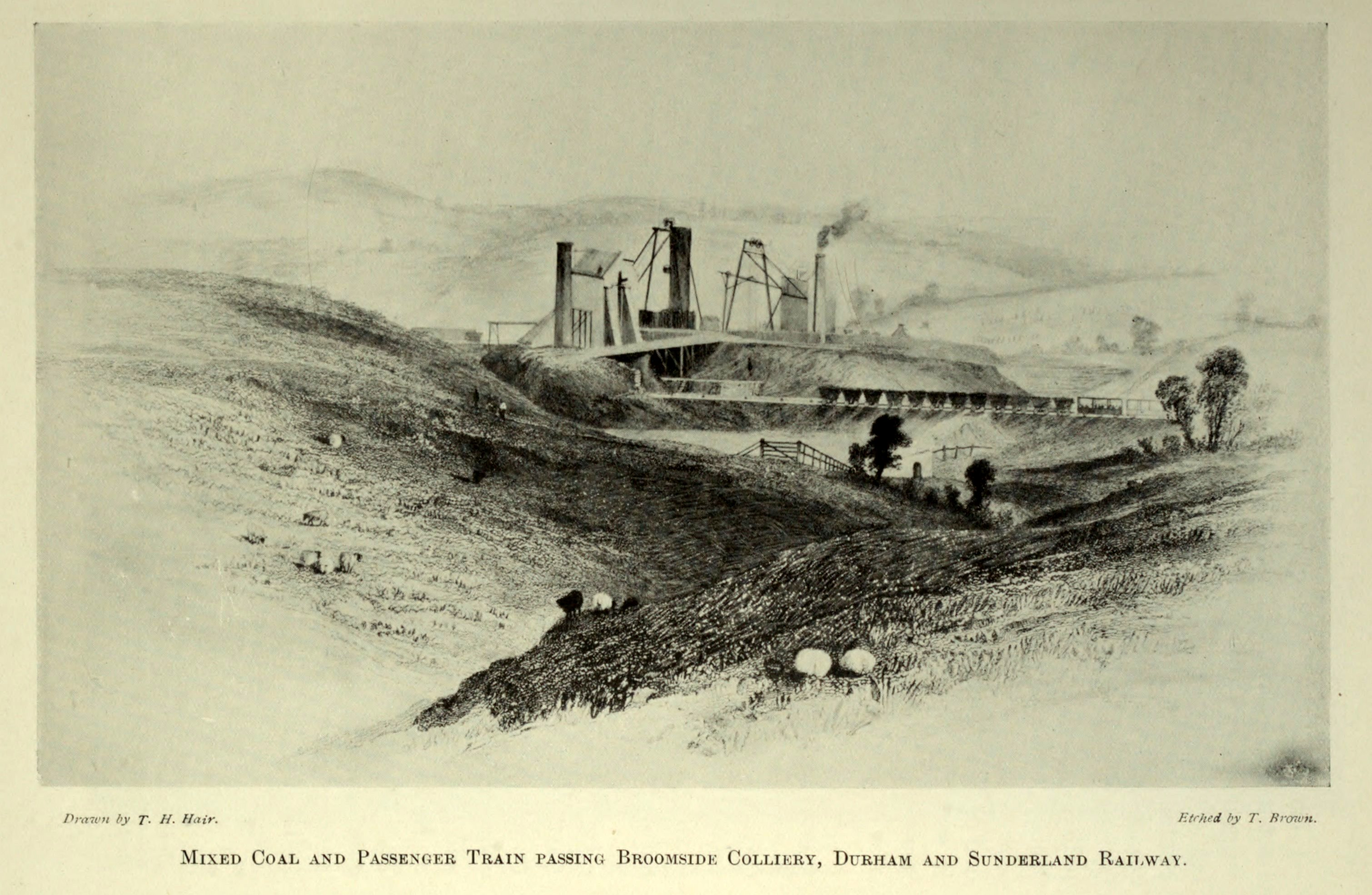
Mid-19th century engraving of a passenger and coal train on the line past Broomside Colliery, between Pittington and Sherburn House.

From 1836, the railway line only ran from Sunderland to Ryhope, a year later reaching Sherburn, and after another year stretching to Shincliffe. The original Sunderland terminus was at Town Moor, a station later described as being a building that "has never been much admired for its architecture, nor for its convenience and accommodation". At this stage, the railway was powered by rope hauling, until around 1857, when locomotives were first used. In 1858, a new Sunderland station was opened at Hendon, about 880 yards south of the original terminus, but, from 1879, passenger trains were diverted into a new Central station. 1893 saw the line reach Durham Elvet by way of a branch off before Shincliffe.

The line started to see decline after World War I, and passenger services to Durham Elvet were stopped at the start of 1931, and instead terminated at Pittington until 1953. The track to Durham Elvet, however, remained, as it was used by specials to ferry in visitors during the annual Durham Miners Gala. In 1953, the line west of Murton saw its last ever train, a travelling circus from Europe. The station buildings at Durham Elvet were demolished in the mid-1960s. Freight services continued to run along the section between Ryhope and Murton (to serve Murton colliery) until the early 1990s.

== The line today ==
The site of Durham Elvet station, near Whinney Hill, is now occupied by a student accommodation for the University of Durham. Where the line crossed the River Wear, the abutments of the bridge can still be seen.

Durham is now only served by Durham railway station (East Coast Main Line) on Wharton Hill.

Sections of the line have been converted into scenic cycle tracks, namely Regional Cycle Network route 20 and National Cycle Network route 14.

== See also ==
- List of closed railway lines in Great Britain
