= Pittington railway station =

Disused railway station in Pittington, County Durham

Pittington
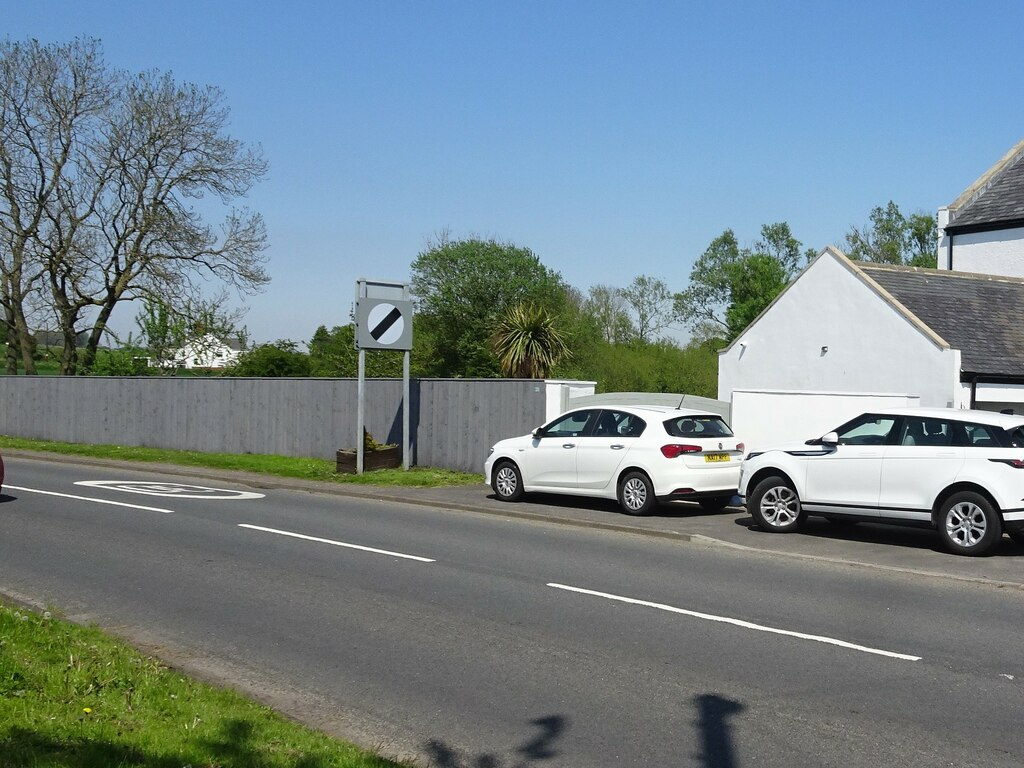
- The site in 2021

General information
- Location: Pittington, County Durham; England
- Coordinates: 54.7984°N 1.4967°W
- Grid reference: NZ324449
- Platforms: 1

Other information
- Status: Disused

History
- Original company: Durham and Sunderland Railway
- Pre-grouping: North Eastern Railway
- Post-grouping: London and North Eastern Railway; British Railways (North Eastern Region)

Key dates
- 6 November 1837: Opened
- 5 January 1953: Closed to passengers
- 4 January 1960: Closed to goods
Location

Pittington railway station served the village of Pittington, County Durham, England, from 1837 to 1960 on the Durham and Sunderland Railway.

== History ==
The station opened on 6 November 1837 by the Durham and Sunderland Railway. It was situated on the east side of Station Road. It was rebuilt in 1875 with a new signal box being installed on the platform. This was replaced in 1948. The station closed to passengers on 5 January 1953 and closed to goods on 4 January 1960. The site is now a cycle way.

Preceding station	Disused railways	Following station
Hetton; Line and station closed	Durham and Sunderland Railway	Sherburn House; Line and station closed
