= Sherburn, County Durham =

Coordinates: 54.774601°N 1.5042200°W

Sherburn
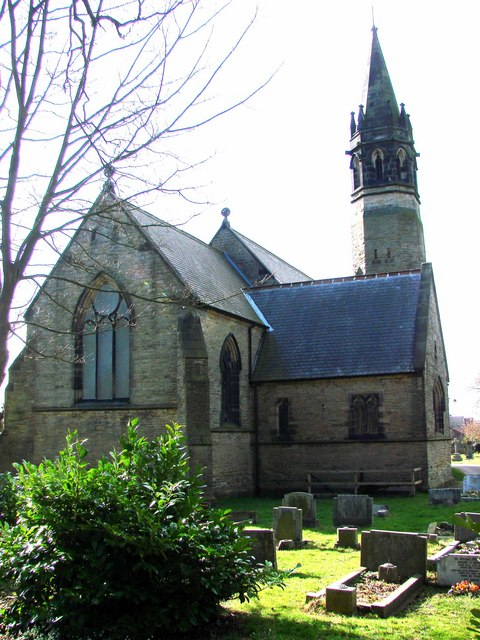
- Church of St Mary The Virgin, Sherburn

- Location within County Durham
- Population: 3,140 (2011)
- OS grid reference: NZ 3199142300
- Civil parish: Sherburn Village
- Unitary authority: County Durham
- Ceremonial county: County Durham
- Region: North East
- Country: England
- Sovereign state: United Kingdom
- Post town: DURHAM
- Postcode district: DH6
- Police: Durham
- Fire: County Durham and Darlington
- Ambulance: North East
- UK Parliament: City of Durham

Sherburn, or Sherburn Village, is a village and civil parish in County Durham, England. It is 4 miles east of Durham. In 2011 the parish had a population of 3140.

The village is located in the Sherburn division of Durham County Council and the City of Durham constituency for Westminster elections. The population of this division taken at the 2011 census was 9,108.

== History ==
A settlement has existed in this location for some considerable time. Until the 19th century Sherburn was a farming village, but with the Industrial Revolution came the sinking of mines to provide coal to fuel the industries and railways to ensure its distribution. By the 1930s the two pits that were within the Parish boundaries were closed and with the demise of neighbouring collieries in the 1960s the railway lines also became redundant.

In recent years Sherburn Village has become a popular place in which to live, surrounded by countryside and with transport links to the city of Durham, Newcastle upon Tyne, Sunderland and Teesside.

Former Sunderland, Peterborough United and West Bromwich Albion centre-half John Wile was born in Sherburn.
