= Lambton Railway =

Railway line in North-East England

Coordinates: 54.8515°N 1.5075°W

The Lambton Railway was a private industrial railway in County Durham, England, constructed initially as a tramway from 1737, to enable coal to be transported from Lambton Collieries to the Port of Sunderland. It closed under the ownership of the National Coal Board in August 1967.

== History ==
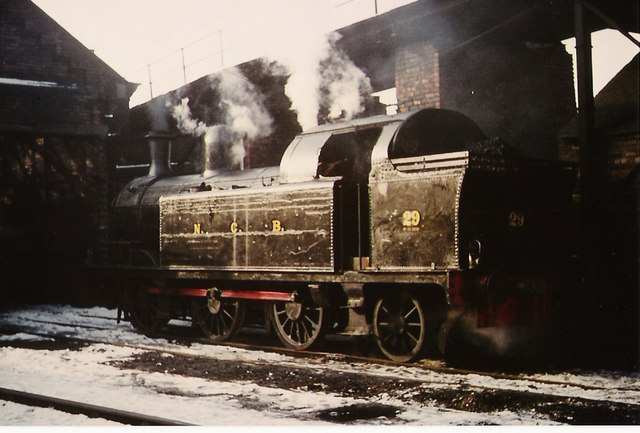
Ex-Lambton Collieries 0-6-2T No.29 at the NCB works, Philadelphia, Tyne and Wear

To enable the coal extracted from the collieries to be transported to the River Wear, from 1737 the company had constructed a horse-drawn tramway from Fatfield to Cox Green. In 1819, the Lambtons bought the Newbottle wagonway, and connected this to the Lambton Railway with a line between Bournmoor and Philadelphia. This now meant that the company had a direct route from its collieries to the River Wear, where it constructed Lambton Staithes within the Port of Sunderland.

The company went steam powered from 1814, initially with a series of 0-6-0T locomotives. However, due to the steepness of the route over Warden Law, which lies 570 feet (170 m) above sea level, the route was worked as a rope-incline with stationary engines until 1864. By 1860, the Lambton was the largest of all the colliery railways in the northeast, totalling across its mainline and branches alone some 70 miles (110 km) of track. Still mainly rope-incline worked and developed from original horse-drawn tramways, in the next 20 years it was reengineered to be mainly steam locomotive powered.

In 1854, the North Eastern Railway was formed, which gave it control of the mainline from Darlington to Newcastle via the Leamside Line. In 1865, the NER opened a branch from Penshaw to Sunderland, which brought about a running-rights agreement between the Lambton and the NER to allow the company to run its trains over NER metals when required. This resulted in the company buying a new series of 0-6-0 tender locomotives to power these heavier mainline trains.

After Lambton Collieries merged with Hetton Collieries in 1911, the company gained control over the Hetton Railway, which was surveyed and laidout by George Stephenson from 1822 primarily for the use of steam locomotives. This was still mainly a rope-incline railway, which was made redundant through access to the Lambton Railway. The company did however additionally connect Lambton staithes to the Hetton staithes within the docks.

In 1924, after the merger with Joicey Collieries, the company gained control of the Beamish Railway, although this remained a separate operation.

== Closure ==
In 1959, the Hetton Railway via Warden Law was closed. A further spate of closures occurred in 1967 with Lambton Staithes being closed in January and the line to Pallion closing in August of the same year.

== Locomotives ==
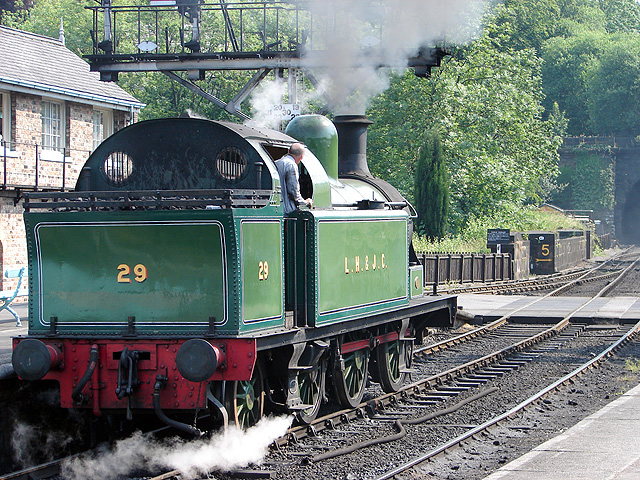
Preserved 0-6-2T Lambton Collieries locomotives No.29, as preserved on the North Yorkshire Moors Railway

In 1904, the Lambton Railway contracted Kitson and Company of Leeds to supply their first 0-6-2T tank engine. Fleet No.29 (Works No 4263) proved so successful, that in 1907 it was supplemented by No's 30 and 31 (Works No’s 4532 & 4533). In 1909, Robert Stephenson and Company of Darlington supplied the modified design No's 5 and 10 (Works No’s 3377 & 3378), followed by No.42 in 1920 (works No 3801). The final locomotive to the design, No.57 (works No 3834) was supplied by Hawthorn Leslie in 1934.

On the merger with Hetton Collieries in 1911, the Lambton Railway had 33 locomotives (12 with tenders), while the Hetton Railway had 8. In 1924, these were supplemented by the merger with Joicey Collieries, which brought an additional 57 locomotives. In 1931, the company bought redundant 0-6-2T from the Great Western Railway: No's 52, 53 and 54 were ex-Taff Vale Railway; No's 55 and 56 were ex-Cardiff Railway. locomotives.

All locomotives on the Lambton Railway were built or modified to a unique loading gauge, which resulted in a rounded-cab profile. This was to enable them to work down the narrow bored tunnel to Lambton Drops (coal staiths) at the Port of Sunderland.

== Lambton Engine Works ==
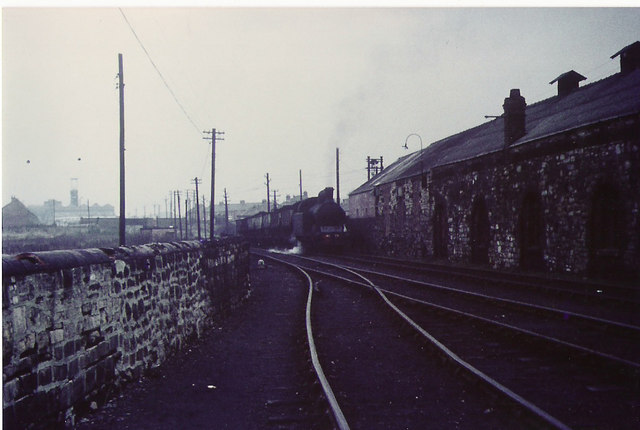
Ex-Lambton Collieries 0-6-2T passes the former Lambton Engine Works at Philadelphia, Tyne and Wear, 1970

By 1882, the original overhaul and heavy maintenance facilities were inadequate for the railway's extensive operations, and so a new "Earl of Durham Works" was built in Philadelphia, which was quickly renamed the Lambton Engine Works. Consisting of two through-running roads for loco repairs, the rest of the structure was filled with machinery. Adjacent to the building were boiler, fitting and machine shops, so that the Works was almost self-contained, with new boilers and fireboxes being the only major items purchased from outside contractors.

In 1917, the works was supplemented by the addition of a running shed. After the merger with Hetton Collieries, that systems Works stayed open until the winter of 1934–1935. After the creation of the NCB in 1947, the Works became the regional centre for all major repairs and all overhauls.

Both the works and running shed buildings still stand today.

== Preserved Locomotives ==
Six locomotives that ran over the Lambton Railway and its successors are known to remain in preservation.

Fleet Number	Builder	Build Date	Works Number	Current Location	Status	Notes	Photograph
5	Robert Stephenson and Company	1909	3377	North Yorkshire Moors Railway	Awaiting Overhaul	0-6-2T	
14	Hawthorn Leslie	1914	3056	Tanfield Railway	Awaiting Overhaul	0-4-0ST	
29	Kitson and Company	1904	4263	North Yorkshire Moors Railway	In Service	0-6-2T	
52	Neilson and Company	1899	5408	Keighley & Worth Valley Railway	In Service	0-6-2T. Ex-TVR Class O2 number 85, GWR number 426. To LH&JC 1929.	
60†	Hunslet Engine Company	1948	3686	Aln Valley Railway	In Service	0-6-0ST	
67†	Taff Vale Railway	1897	306	Gwili Railway	Cosmetically Restored	0-6-2T, Ex-TVR Class O1 number 28, GWR number 450. To LMR 1927, became W.D 205 then 70205. To NCB 1947.	

† Only operated on the Ex-Lambton Hetton & Joicey lines during National Coal Board ownership.
