= Lambton Collieries =

UK business

Lambton Collieries was a privately owned colliery and coal mining company, based in County Durham, England.

== History ==
The name derives from Lambton Castle, the ancestral family home of the Lambton family.

With coal having been extracted in the area from the 1600s, the commercial extraction of coal was developed by John Lambton in the lands surrounding the castle through the Wear Valley. The first of seven pits was sunk in the village of Bournmoor from 1783 onwards, which together were to make up what was known as Lambton Colliery.

The company was first formed when Lambton's grandson, John Lambton the first Earl of Durham, entered Parliament as a Whig politician. The formal name change to Lambton Collieries was adopted in 1896.

In 1910 the company merged with Hetton Collieries to form Lambton & Hetton Collieries. In 1924, that company merged with Joicey Collieries to form Lambton, Hetton & Joicey Collieries.

In 1947, along with all of the other private coal companies of the United Kingdom, it was nationalised under the Coal Industry Nationalisation Act 1946 to form the National Coal Board.

== Lambton Railway ==
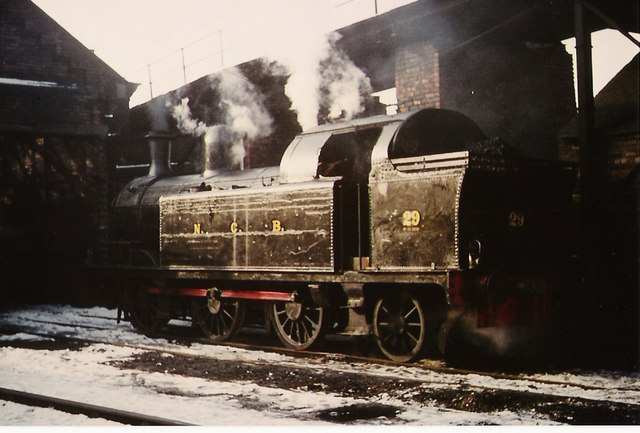
Ex-Lambton Collieries 0-6-2T No.29 at the NCB works, Philadelphia, Tyne and Wear

To enable the coal extracted from the collieries to be transported to the River Wear, from 1737 the company had constructed a horse-drawn tramway from Fatfield to Cox Green. In 1819 the Lambton's bought the Newbottle wagonway, and connected this to the Lambton Railway with a line between Bournmoor and Philadelphia. This now meant that the company had a direct route from its collieries to the River Wear, where it constructed Lambton Staithes within the Port of Sunderland.

The company went steam powered from 1814, initially with a series of 0-6-0T locomotives. However, due to the steepness of the route over Warden Law, which lies 570 feet (170 m) above sea level, the route was worked as a rope-incline with stationary engines until 1864. By 1860, the Lambton was the largest of all the colliery railways in the northeast, totalling across its mainline and branches alone some 70 miles (110 km) of track. Still mainly rope-incline worked and developed from original horse-drawn tramways, in the next 20 years it was reengineered to be mainly steam locomotive powered.

In 1854 the North Eastern Railway was formed, which gave it control of the mainline from Darlington to Newcastle via the Leamside Line. In 1865, the NER opened a branch from Penshaw to Sunderland, which brought about a running-rights agreement between the Lambton and the NER to allow the company to run its trains over NER metals when required. This resulted in the company buying a new series of 0-6-0 tender locomotives to power these heavier mainline trains.

After Lambton Collieries merged with Hetton Collieries in 1911, the company gained control over the Hetton Railway, which was surveyed and laidout by George Stephenson from 1822 primarily for the use of steam locomotives. This was still mainly a rope-incline railway, which was made redundant through access to the Lambton Railway. The company did however additionally connect Lambton staithes to the Hetton staithes within the docks.

In 1924 after the merger with Joicey Collieries, the company gained control of the Beamish Railway, although this remained a separate operation.

In 1959 the Hetton Railway via Warden Law was closed. A further spate of closures occurred in 1967 with Lambton Staithes being closed in January and the line to Pallion closing in August of the same year.

== Collieries ==
Name	Location	Sunk	Depth	Closed	Notes
Lambton A	Bournmoor	1783			
Lambton B	Bournmoor				
Lambton C	Bournmoor				
Lambton D	Bournmoor				
Lambton E	Bournmoor				
Adolphus Pit	High Pittington	1826			Named after Lord Adolphus Vane-Tempest, a son of the Marquess of Londonderry. All pits in the area were served by the Sherburnhouse branch of the Lambton Railway
Londonderry Pit	High Pittington	1828			Named after the Marquess of Londonderry
