= Washington railway station (England) =

Disused railway station in Washington, Tyne and Wear

Washington
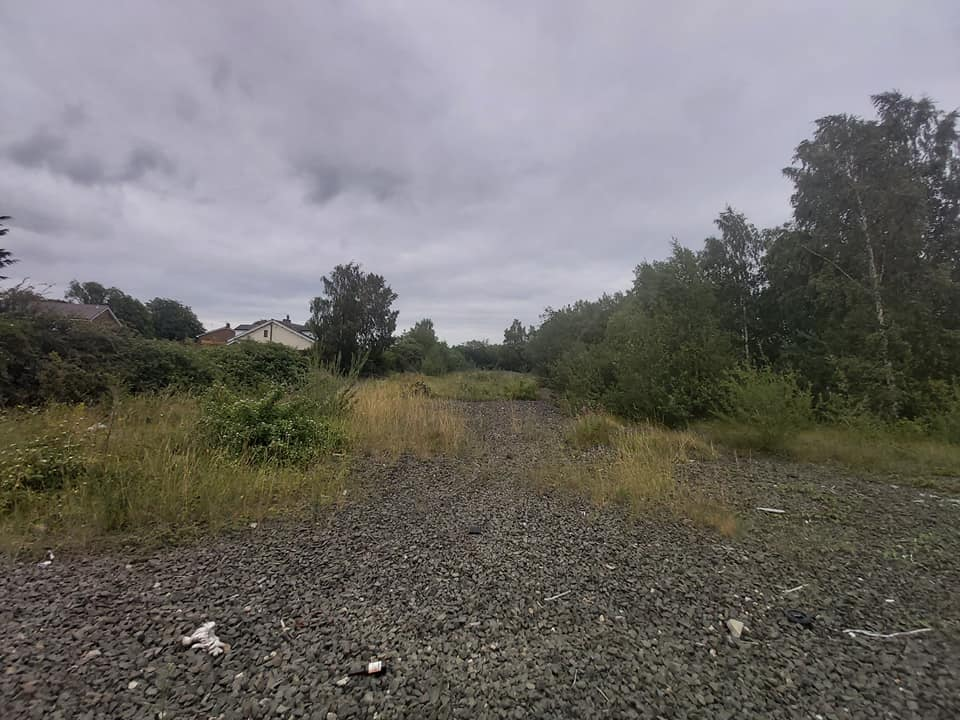
- The station site in 2020

General information
- Location: Washington, Tyne and Wear; England
- Coordinates: 54.8946°N 1.5034°W
- Grid reference: NZ319556
- Platforms: 2

Other information
- Status: Disused

History
- Original company: Stanhope & Tyne Railway
- Pre-grouping: North Eastern Railway
- Post-grouping: LNER; British Rail (North Eastern)

Key dates
- 16 April 1835: First station opened on Stanhope & Tyne Railway
- 9 March 1840: Passenger services to Rainton Meadows commence
- 1 October 1850: Second station opened 600yd to the north east on direct line to Pelaw
- December 1853: First station closed completely
- 9 September 1963: Second station closed to passengers
- 7 December 1964: Second station closed completely
Location

Washington railway station served the town of Washington, Tyne and Wear, England from 1835 to 1963, initially on the Stanhope & Tyne Railway and later the Leamside line.

== History ==
The first station in Washington was opened on 16 April 1835 as an intermediate stop on the Stanhope and Tyne Railway passenger service between Durham Turpike and South Shields. On 9 March 1840 the Durham Junction Railway introduced a passenger service along their line from Rainton Meadows which, beyond Washington, continued along the S&TR and the Brandling Junction Railway to Oakwellgate in Gateshead via Brockley Whins. The station was not conveniently located, being 1 mile to the south east of Washington Village with the station building located between the tracks of S&TR and DJR, immediately south of the junction between them. On 19 June 1844, southbound services along the DJR were diverted to Gilesgate and Ferryhill along the newly constructed Newcastle and Darlington Junction Railway and on 1 October 1850, the York, Newcastle and Berwick Railway diverted Gateshead services along a new, more direct route to Pelaw, thus allowing the line to bypass Brockley Whins. When the YN&BR diverted services onto the direct line to Pelaw, they began to use a new station in Washington, 600yd to north east of the original and only the market day services to Durham Turnpike continued to use the first station until they were withdrawn in December 1853.

The second station was situated on Station Road, south of the railway bridge and level crossing on Usworth Station Road and Washington Road respectively and was closer to Washington Village than the first station had been. Adjacent to the station were brickworks a wire rope works and a large chemicals plant. North of the footbridge were two buildings: one was the rear of a goods shed and the other was lower with a hipped roof. The goods shed was reached by the sidings on the up platform. The goods handled at the station were bricks, iron, steel, composition and livestock.

In March 1862, a passenger service along the former S&TR route was reintroduced (this time from the second station) providing a service to Chester-le-Street and Pelton. However the opening of Chester-le-Street station on the Team Valley Line led to it being permanently withdrawn in January 1869. Inter-city services between London and Newcastle continued to use the line through Washington until 15 January 1872 when services were diverted via Durham and the Team Valley line after which point only local services used the Leamside line.

The passenger bookings had declined to a mere 2,318 in 1951. Passenger services started to decline after summer 1957, and by 1963 Monday-Friday departures consisted of a single morning arrival at 8:56 and a single afternoon departure at 17:33 from and to Newcastle. The Beeching Report recommended closing the station to passenger traffic, which occurred on 9 September 1963 (making it the first post-Beeching closure in the country). Goods continued to be handled at the station until 7 December 1964.

== Reopening ==
As part of the Washington extension of the Tyne & Wear Metro, this station may be reopened as Washington South metro station.

Preceding station	Disused railways	Following station
Durham Turnpike; Line and station closed	Stanhope & Tyne Railway; Durham Turnpike-South Shields	Boldon; Line and station closed
connection to Durham Junction Railway	Stanhope & Tyne Railway; Durham Turnpike-South Shields	Boldon; Line and station closed
Penshaw; Line and station closed	Durham Junction Railway; Rainton Meadows-Oakwellgate	connection to Stanhope & Tyne Railway
Penshaw; Line and station closed	North Eastern Railway; Leamside line	Usworth; Line and station closed
