= Vigo railway station =

Vigo railway station may refer to:

- Vigo-Urzáiz railway station, station in Vigo, Spain
- Vigo-Guixar railway station, station in Vigo, Spain
- Vialia Vigo, a 2016 high speed railway station in Vigo, Spain, by architect Thom Mayne
- Vigo railway station (England), former station in Tyne and Wear, England
