= LCR 29 =

Preserved British 0-6-2 locomotive

LCR No. 29
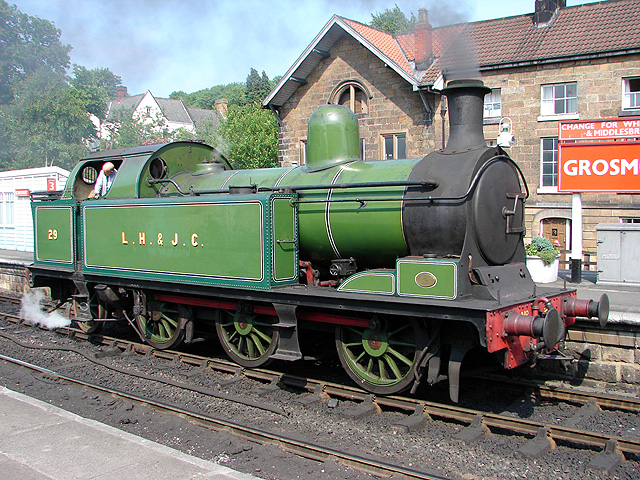
- No. 29 sitting at Grosmont station in 2006
Type and origin
- Power type: Steam
- Builder: Kitson and Company
- Serial number: 4263
- Build date: 1904
Specifications
- Configuration
  - Whyte: 0-6-2T
  - UIC: C'1ht
- Gauge: 4 ft 8 1/2 in (1,435 mm) standard gauge
- Driver dia.: 4 ft 6 in (1.37 m)
- Loco weight: 60 t (59 long tons; 66 short tons)
- Fuel type: Coal
- Boiler pressure: 165 psi (1,140 kPa)
- Cylinders: Two, inside
- Cylinder size: 19 in × 26 in (480 mm × 660 mm)
- Valve gear: Allan (straight link)
- Valve type: Slide valves
Performance figures
- Tractive effort: 23,500 lbf (105,000 N)
Career
- Operators: Lambton Collieries; Lambton Railway; National Coal Board; North Yorkshire Moors Railway
- Numbers: LH&JC; NCB 29; NYMR 29
- First run: 1904
- Withdrawn: February 1969
- Restored: June 1970
- Current owner: North Yorkshire Moors Railway
- Disposition: Operational

Lambton Colliery Railway No. 29 is a preserved 0-6-2 tank locomotive built by Kitson and Company for the Lambton Colliery network in 1904. It was the first 0-6-2T to be employed on that system, and it was later joined by No.5. No.29 was designed to work between Philadelphia and Sunderland. In February 1969, No.29 was withdrawn from service and placed into dead storage. The following year, the locomotive was purchased by volunteers from the North Yorkshire Moors Railway, and it was restored to working order. As of 2026, the locomotive remains operational on the NYMR.

== History ==
=== Original service life ===
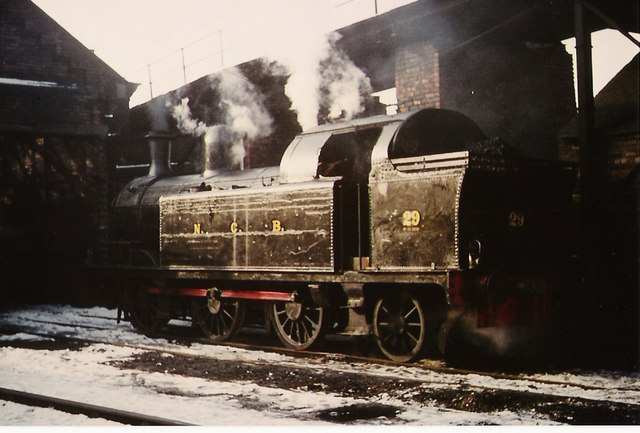
No. 29 being prepped at Philadelphia in NCB colours, 1970

The Lambton Colliery was a privately owned colliery, in County Durham, England. In the early 1900s, the company had a need for larger and more powerful locomotives than their existing 0-6-0 tender locomotives from the 1850s. In 1904, they approached Kitson and Company in Leeds, West Yorkshire, and they bought their first 0-6-2 tank locomotive, No. 29. 0-6-2 tank locomotives were previously introduced and proven their worth in hauling coal loads. With a tractive force of 23,500 lbf (105 kN) and boiler pressure of 165 psi (1,140 kPa), the LCR decided to purchase two identical locomotives for their roster in 1907, Nos 30 and 31. In 1909, two more 0-6-2s were bought by the LCR, Nos. 5 and 10, but these were built by Robert Stephenson and Company with a slightly different design. Two more 0-6-2s followed for the railway in 1920 and 1934, Nos. 42 and 57. Some Ex Taff Vale Great Western Railway 0-6-2s would also soon follow.

No. 29 and its classmates were used for shunting and pulling wagon loads of coal on LCR's rail lines, particularly between the pitheads near Philadelphia and the quayside coal staithes at Sunderland. In the late 1950s under the ownership of the National Coal Board (NCB), the Durham Coal field was being wound down, and a further spate of closures occurred in 1967 with Lambton Staithes being closed in January and the line to Pallion closing in August of the same year. The following year, the NCB planned to transition to diesel power and gradually withdraw their remaining steam locomotives. In spite of an overhaul being completed in October 1968, No. 29 was withdrawn three months later on 15 February 1969 and placed into storage in Philadelphia shortly thereafter.

=== Preservation ===
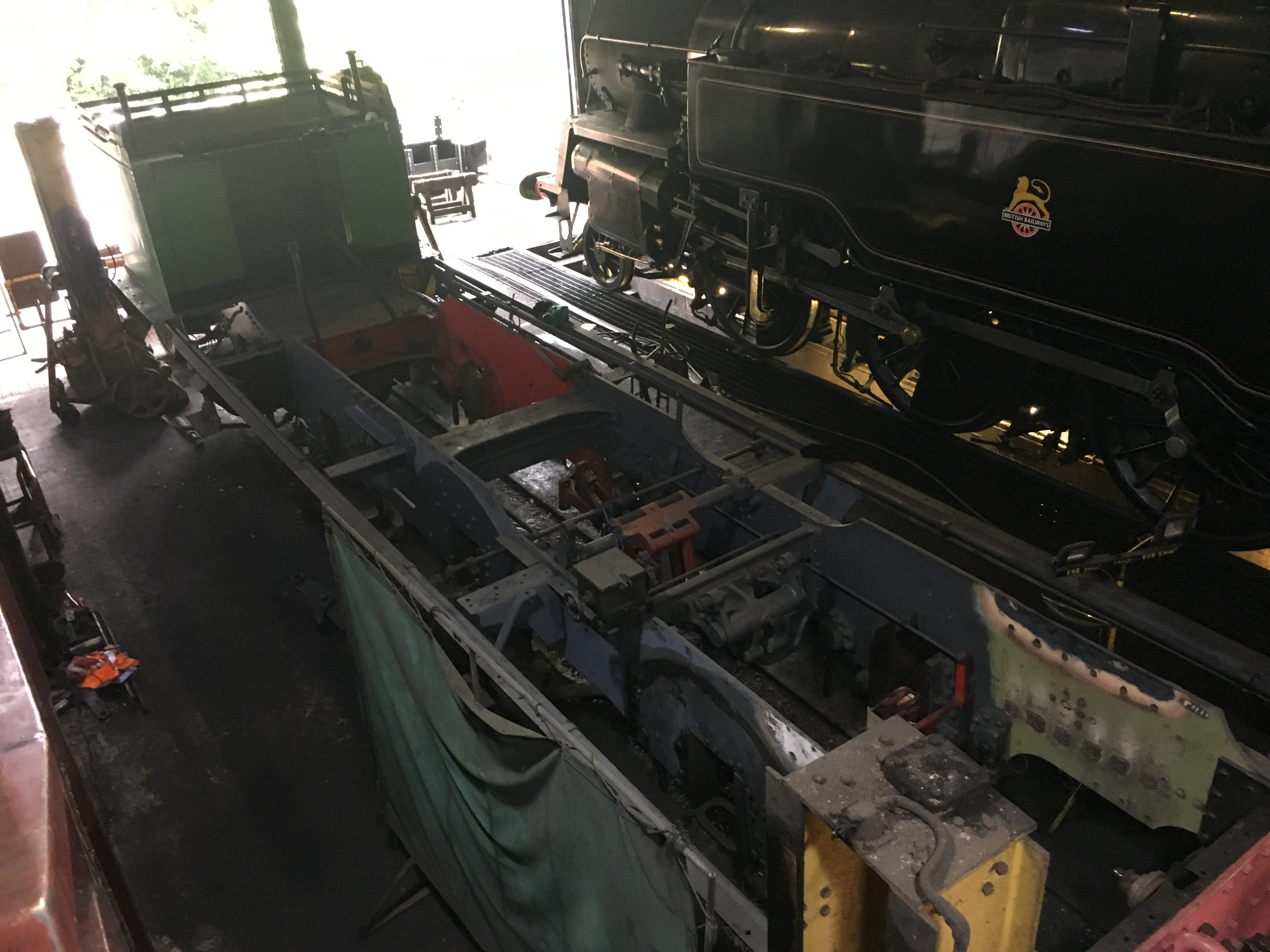
No.29 when it was being overhauled next to BR Standard Class 4 2-6-4T No. 80136, 2018

In January 1970 three volunteers went to Philadelphia to examine Nos.5 and 29 with a view to purchase them. All the other withdrawn locomotives remained inside Philadelphia Works. During May, they were informed that their bids for Nos. 5 and 29 had been successful, so they commenced preparing them for their journey to the North Yorkshire Moors Railway. The initial plan was that the locomotive would be hauled by BR Class 46 diesel locomotive No. D186. However, the steam locomotive was allowed to haul the train to Thornaby and when it arrived there, No. 29 was fitted with a LMS-style vacuum braking system from an LMS Class 5 4-6-0, and the left leading axlebox was re-metalled. Then, BR Class 37 No. D6899 hauled No. 29, along with LNER Q6 No. 63395, from Thornaby to the NYMR's main location in Grosmont. Under NYMR's ownership, No. 29 was restored to working order and hauling rail tours on their rails since the railway's reopening on 1 May 1973, rotated in and out of service over time. It was also given the name Peggy.

Having returned to steam after another overhaul for the 40th Anniversary of the NYMR in 2013, No. 29 was in frequent use until October 2014, when a crack was discovered in the cylinder block and it was withdrawn in need of a replacement. Another overhaul was completed in July 2019 for the Annual Steam Gala. In July 2021, No. 29 made an appearance at the Didcot Railway Centre in Didcot, Oxfordshire for that year's Diamond Jubilee Gala to celebrate the Great Western Society's 60th anniversary. It is still available for traffic as of 2025. It carries the LH&JC initials of the Lambton, Hetton and Joicey Colliery system, formed by various amalgamations in 1924.

== See also ==
- 0-6-2
- Taff Vale Railway O1 class
- Taff Vale Railway O2 class
- List of preserved British industrial steam locomotives
