= Durham Turnpike railway station =

Disused railway station in County Durham & Tyne and Wear, England

Durham Turnpike
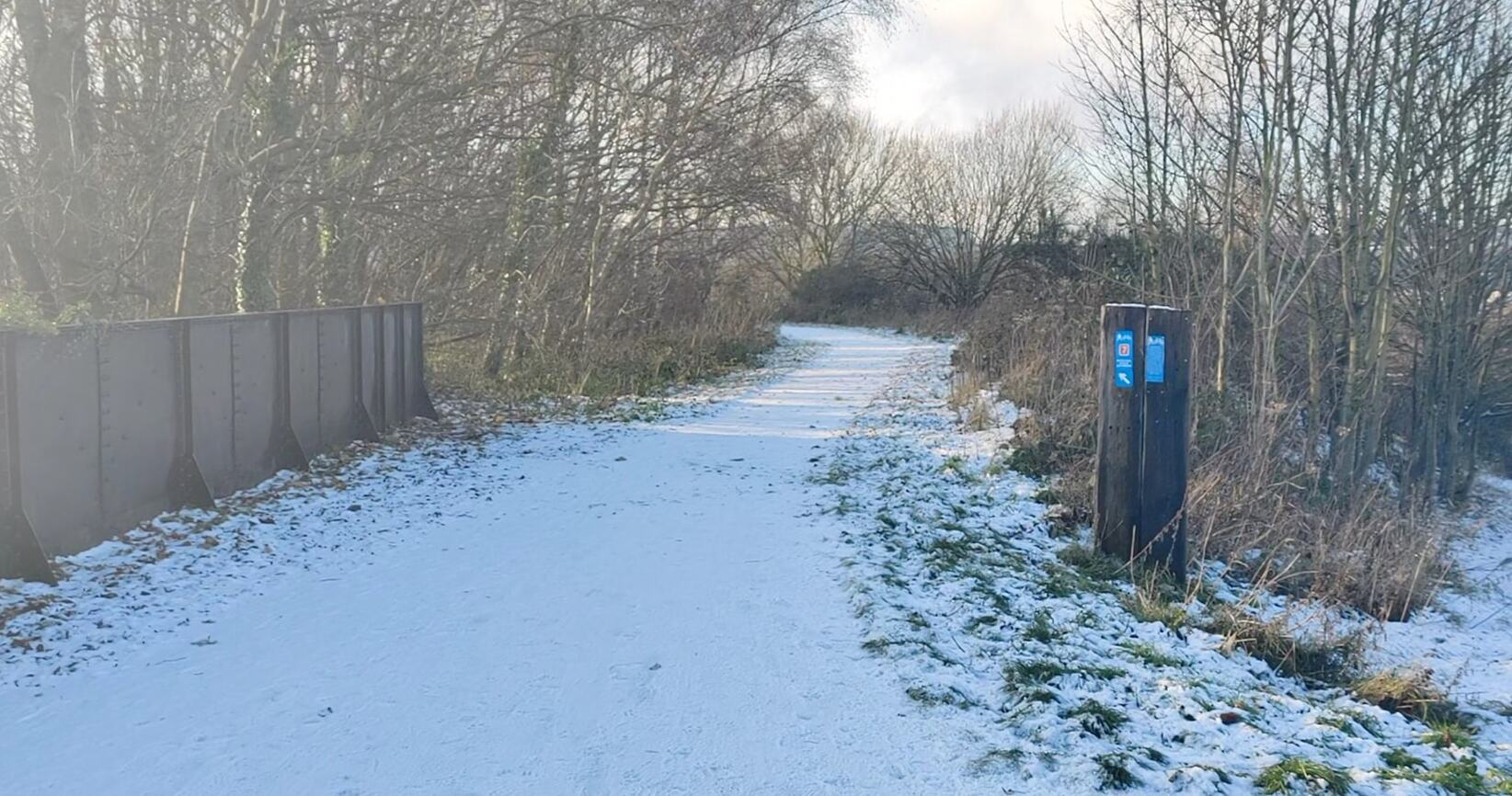
- Site of Durham Turnpike station

General information
- Location: Birtley, Tyne and Wear. South Pelaw and Chester-le-Street, County Durham; England
- Coordinates: 54.8759°N 1.5758°W
- Platforms: ?

Other information
- Status: Disused

History
- Original company: Stanhope & Tyne Railway
- Pre-grouping: North Eastern Railway
- Post-grouping: LNER; British Rail (North Eastern)

Key dates
- April 1835: Opened
- December 1853: Closed
- March 1862: Reopened
- January 1869: Closed
- 1980s: Line closed
Location

Durham Turnpike railway station served the towns of Birtley (historically County Durham, now Tyne and Wear) and Chester-le-Street as well as the village of South Pelaw in County Durham, England. The station was on the Stanhope and Tyne Railway and opened in 1835, only to close in 1853. It reopened in 1862 along with nearby Vigo but closed again in 1869. The line remained open for passenger services until 1955 and to freight until the 1980s.

The line and station site now form the Consett and Sunderland Railway Path between Chester-le-Street and Washington. The station straddles the border between the modern-day counties of County Durham and Tyne and Wear. The station, despite its name, did not serve the city of Durham which was eight miles southwest from the station.

| Preceding station | Historical railways | Following station |
|---|---|---|
| Vigo; Line and station closed | Stanhope and Tyne Railway | Pelton; Line and station closed |
