= Boldon railway station =

Disused railway station in East Boldon

Boldon
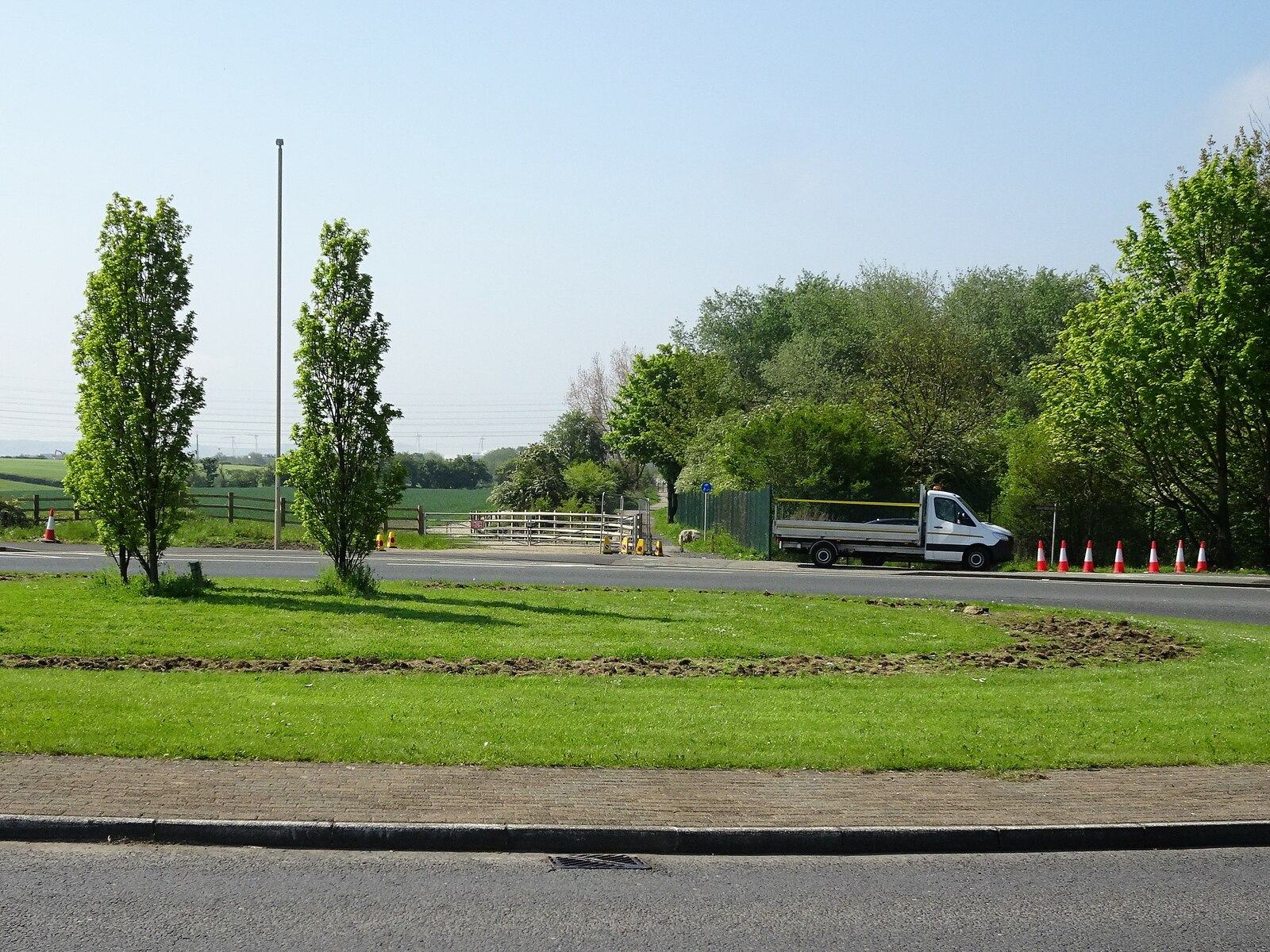
- The site of the station in 2021

General information
- Location: East Boldon, Tyne and Wear; England
- Coordinates: 54.9414°N 1.4652°W
- Grid reference: NZ342608
- Platforms: 2

Other information
- Status: Disused

History
- Original company: Pontop and South Shields Railway
- Pre-grouping: York, Newcastle and Berwick Railway

Key dates
- August 1844: Opened
- December 1853: Closed to passengers
- 7 August 1967: Closed to goods
Location

Boldon railway station served the village of East Boldon, Tyne and Wear, England, from 1844 to 1967 on the Pontop and South Shields Railway.

== History ==
The station was opened in August 1844 by the Pontop and South Shields Railway. It was situated on the south side of a level crossing on Newcastle Road. Eleven trains ran on weekdays and eight ran on weekends but a limited service began when a new route opened on 1 October 1850. Trains eventually ceased in December 1853 and the station closed to passengers, although it remained open for goods traffic. Its name was changed to West Boldon sometime after. It had a coal and lime depot and two sidings were installed in 1895. Boldon Colliery was to the north. The station closed completely on 7 August 1967.

Preceding station	Disused railways	Following station
Washington; Line and station closed	Pontop and South Shields Railway	Boldon Colliery; Line and station closed
