= Cox Green railway station =

Disused railway station in Cox Green, Tyne and Wear

Cox Green
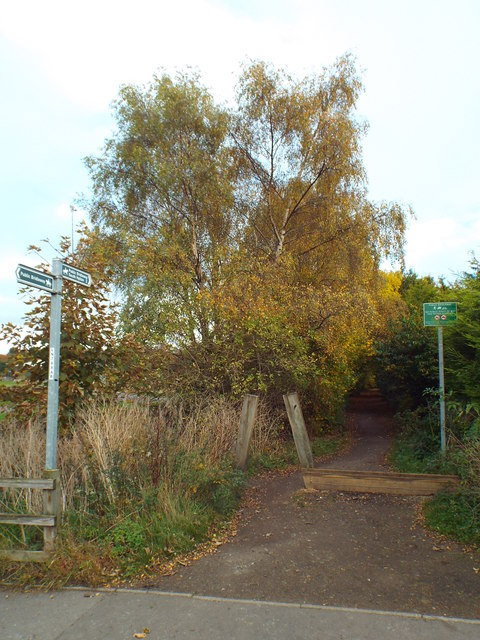
- The site of the station in 2016

General information
- Location: Cox Green, Tyne and Wear; England
- Coordinates: 54.8878°N 1.487°W
- Grid reference: NZ330549
- Platforms: 2

Other information
- Status: Disused

History
- Original company: North Eastern Railway
- Pre-grouping: North Eastern Railway
- Post-grouping: LNER; British Railways (North Eastern Region)

Key dates
- November 1854: Opened as Coxgreen Crossing
- April 1857: Name changed to Coxgreen
- July 1931: Name changed to Cox Green
- 4 May 1964: Closed
Location

Cox Green railway station served the civil parish of Cox Green, Tyne and Wear, England, from 1854 to 1964 on the Penshaw Branch.

== History ==
The station opened as Coxgreen Crossing in November 1854 by the North Eastern Railway. It was situated in the north side of Coxgreen Road. Its name was changed to Coxgreen in April 1857. It initially had short platforms but they were doubled in size in 1896 as well as more services per day. Its name was changed again to Cox Green in July 1931. It didn't attract as many passengers as Hylton because of its isolated location; Hylton had booked 54,250 passengers, whereas Cox Green booked 9,095 passengers. It was downgraded to an unstaffed halt on 14 August 1961 and it closed on 4 May 1964. The station building remains in residential use but it has been expanded since.

Preceding station	Disused railways	Following station
Hylton; Line and station closed	North Eastern Railway; Penshaw Branch	Penshaw; Line and station closed
