= Steam Horse locomotive =

Early British locomotive (1813–1815)

Brunton's Mechanical Traveller I
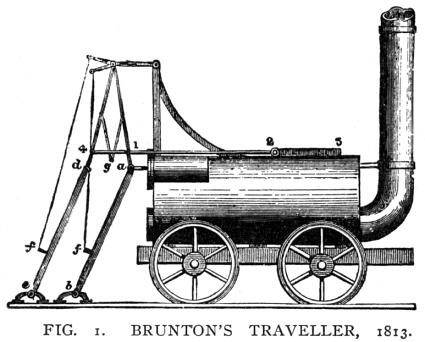
- Brunton's Mechanical Traveller
Type and origin
- Power type: Steam
- Builder: William Brunton
- Build date: c. 1813
Specifications
- Configuration
  - Whyte: Four unpowered wheels
  - UIC: 2
- Loco weight: 2 1/4 long tons (2.3 t; 2.5 short tons)
- Boiler pressure: 40 lbf/in^{2} (280 kPa)
- Cylinders: 1
- Cylinder size: 6 in × 24 in (152 mm × 610 mm)
Performance figures
- Maximum speed: 3 miles per hour (4.8 km/h)
Career
- Operators: Butterley Ironworks

Brunton's Mechanical Traveller II
Type and origin
- Power type: Steam
- Builder: William Brunton
- Build date: October 1814
Specifications
- Configuration
  - Whyte: Four unpowered wheels
  - UIC: 2
- Loco weight: 5 long tons (5.1 t; 5.6 short tons)
- Cylinders: 1 or 2
Performance figures
- Maximum speed: 2.5 miles per hour (4.0 km/h)
Career
- Operators: Newbottle Colliery
- Retired: 31 July 1815
- Disposition: destroyed by boiler explosion

The Steam Horse was an early railway steam locomotive constructed by the Butterley Company in Derbyshire in 1813 by William Brunton (1777–1851). Also known as the Mechanical Traveller, it had a pair of mechanical legs, with feet that gripped the ground behind the engine to push it forwards along the rails at about three miles an hour.

== Design ==
The collieries were well served between towns by the canal system. From the pit head to the canals, horse-drawn wagonways had been constructed and steam engines were seen as no more than a noisy and dangerous novelty. However the Napoleonic Wars from 1799 to 1815 had brought a great increase in the price of fodder. Moreover, some such "railways" were being constructed on the steeper gradients within canals, as for instance on the Charnwood Forest Canal.

Few believed that steel wheels on smooth steel rails would give enough adhesion until Robert Stephenson and William Hedley proved otherwise in 1813 and even the former considered 1 in 100 (1%) was the absolute maximum grade. Consequently, such steam operated systems as there were, were operated by cumbersome cables, or by the use of an expensive rack and pinion.

This makes Brunton's idea seem more reasonable, given that the Butterley Company were faced with a gradient of 1 in 50 between its Limestone quarry at Crich to the Cromford Canal at Amber Wharf, some 1.25 miles (2.01 km) away. Brunton took out a patent, No. 3700, dated 22 May 1813 for the locomotive. The Butterley locomotive cost a total of £240.

== Newbottle ==
The historical record is scanty, but it seems that the Steam Horse operated successfully for an unknown period. So much so that another, larger one with a 9 ft (2.7 m) boiler rather than the original 5 ft (1.5 m) seems to have been built for the Newbottle Colliery in County Durham. This locomotive cost £540 and may have had two cylinders. During 1814 and 1815, it hauled loads up a 1 in 36 gradient at 3 miles per hour (4.8 km/h), but the colliery owners were not happy with it. On 31 July 1815, during a demonstration, the new wrought iron boiler exploded, killing thirteen spectators and injuring several others. The reason was that the safety valves had been screwed down too tightly and were therefore not working. The idea was not pursued afterwards. This incident was the first recorded railway disaster.
