= Usworth railway station =

Disused railway station in Usworth, Tyne and Wear

Usworth
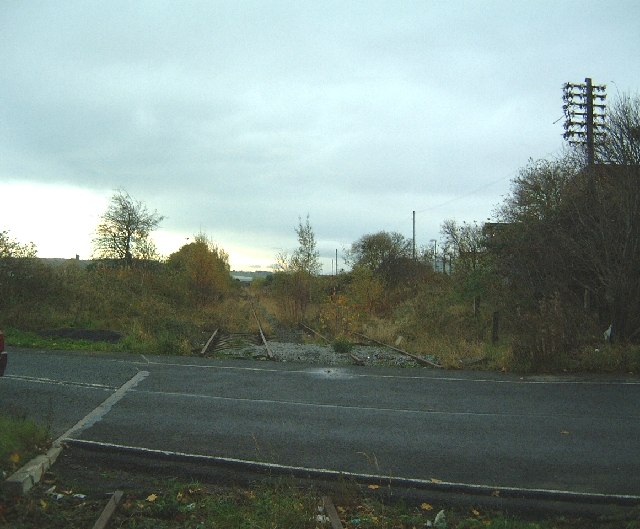
- The station site in 2005

General information
- Location: Usworth, Washington; England
- Coordinates: 54.9124°N 1.5023°W
- Grid reference: NZ320576
- Platforms: 2

Other information
- Status: Disused

History
- Original company: North Eastern Railway
- Post-grouping: LNER; British Rail (North Eastern)

Key dates
- May 1864: Opened
- 9 September 1963: Closed
Location

Usworth railway station served the village of Usworth, Washington, England from 1864 to 1963 on the Leamside line.

== History ==
The station was opened in May 1864 by the North Eastern Railway. The station was situated south of the level crossing on Usworth Station Road and Washington Road. Goods traffic handled at the station included bricks, potatoes, gravel, sand and livestock. The train services slowly became less frequent with a significant reduction in service during the Second World War until the September 1953 timetable showed that no trains called as Usworth. The bookings at Usworth had declined to only 5,593 in 1951. From 14 September 1959 there were no staff at the station so the station was class as an unstaffed halt, although the halt suffix was not added to its name. The station was later closed due to the Beeching Report on 9 September 1963 to both passenger services and goods traffic. The station had been demolished by the 1970s.

== Reopening ==
As part of the Washington extension of the Tyne & Wear Metro, this station may be reopened as Washington North metro station.

Preceding station	Disused railways	Following station
Washington; Line and station closed	North Eastern Railway; Leamside line	Pelaw; Line and station closed
