= William Brunton =

Scottish engineer

William Brunton Senior (26 May 1777 – 5 October 1851) was a Scottish engineer and inventor.

== Early life ==
He was the eldest son of Robert Brunton, a watchmaker (14 Aug 1748–1834) of Dalkeith, where he was born.

He studied mechanics in his father's watch and clock making shop, and engineering under his grandfather William Brunton (16 July 1706 – 22 March 1787), who was a colliery viewer in the neighborhood. (His grandfather's death certificate states that William Brunton was actually a portioner in Dalkeith, not a colliery viewer.)

== Career ==
In 1790 Brunton began work in the fitting shops of the cotton mills at New Lanark. In 1796, he moved south to Birmingham, employed Boulton and Watt at the Soho Foundry. He became foreman and superintendent of the engine manufactory there. At age 21, he carried out onsite maintenance for clients.

Leaving Soho. Brunton in 1808 joined the Butterley Works of Benjamin Outram and William Jessop. He met John Rennie, Thomas Telford and other eminent engineers. In 1815 he returned to Birmingham, as a partner, mechanical manager at the Eagle Foundry, where he remained for ten years.

From 1825 to 1835 Brunton appears to have been practising in London as a civil engineer. In 1832, with Henry Habberley Price, he proposed a Bristol and London Railway, at an estimated cost of £2.5 million, but financial support was lacking. Quitting London in 1835 he took a share in the Cwmafan Tin Works, Glamorganshire, where he erected copper smelting furnaces and rolling mills. He became connected with the Maesteg Works in the same county, and with a brewery at Neath in 1838; here a total failure ensued, and he lost his savings.

== Inventions ==
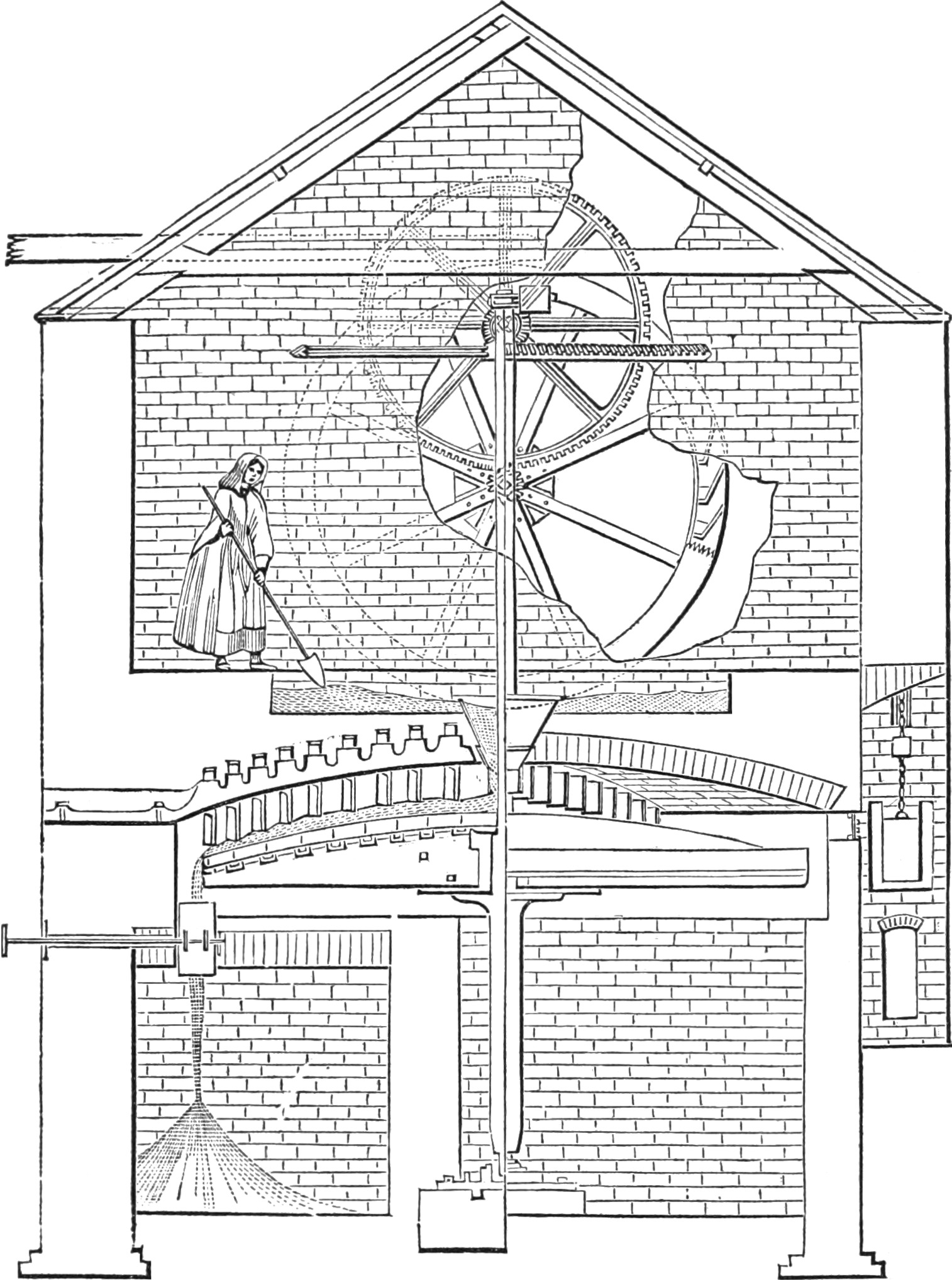
Drawing of a Brunton calciner.

As a mechanical engineer his works were various and important; many of them were in the adaptation of original and ingenious modes of reducing and manufacturing metals, and the improvement of the machinery connected therewith. In the introduction of steam navigation he had a large share; he made some of the original engines used on the Humber and the Trent, and some of the earliest on the Mersey, including those for the vessel which first plied on the Liverpool ferries in 1814. He fitted out the Sir Francis Drake at Plymouth in 1824, the first steamer that ever took a man-of-war in tow.

Brunton took out nine patents in all, three of them while he was in Birmingham. His first was for a steam boiler furnace with a revolving bed and a vibrating hopper which distributed the fuel evenly. His calciner was used on the works of most of the tin mines in Cornwall, as well as at the silver ore works in Mexico, and his fan regulator was also found to be a most useful invention.

At the Butterley works he applied the principle of a rapid rotation of the mould in casting iron pipes, and incurred great expense in securing a patent, only to find that a foreigner, who used the same process in casting terra cotta, had recited in his specifications that the same mode might be applied to metals.

The most novel and ingenious of his inventions was the walking machine called the Steam Horse, which he made at Butterley in 1813 for use on the company's tramway at Crich. A second one was built for the Newbottle colliery, which worked with a load up a gradient of 1 in 36 during all the winter of 1814. Early in 1815, through some carelessness, this machine exploded and killed thirteen persons.

In the course of his career he obtained many patents, but derived little remuneration from them, although several of them came into general use. Latterly he turned his attention to the subject of improved ventilation for collieries, and sent models of his inventions to the Great Exhibition in Hyde Park. He was intimate with all the engineers of the older school, and was almost the last of that celebrated set of men.

== Later life ==
After his experience at Neath, he occasionally reappeared in his profession, but was never again fully embarked in business. He was a member of the Institution of Civil Engineers, but the date of his admission has not been found.

Brunton died at the residence of his son, William Brunton, at Camborne, Cornwall, 5 October 1851, having married, 30 October 1810, Anne Elizabeth Button, adopted daughter of John and Rebecca Dickinson of Summer Hill, Birmingham. She died at Eaglesbush, Neath, Glamorganshire, 1845, leaving sons who became well known engineers in their own right - John born 1812, William born 1817, J. Dickinson born 1821 and George born 1823.
