= Fencehouses railway station =

Disused railway station in Fencehouses, Tyne and Wear

Fencehouses
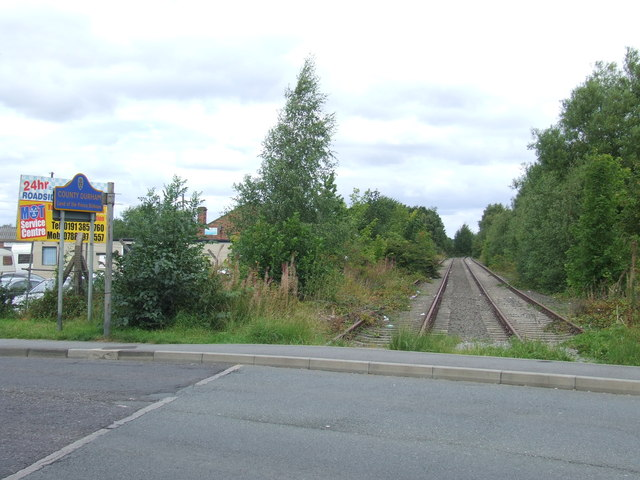
- The site of the station in 2011

General information
- Location: Fencehouses, Tyne and Wear; England
- Coordinates: 54.8465°N 1.5062°W
- Grid reference: NZ318503
- Platforms: 2

Other information
- Status: Disused

History
- Original company: Durham Junction Railway
- Pre-grouping: North Eastern Railway
- Post-grouping: LNER; British Rail (North Eastern)

Key dates
- August 1841: Opened
- 4 May 1964: Closed to passengers
- 1 June 1964: Closed to freight
- 18 July 1964: last Miners Gala train
Location

Fencehouses railway station served the village of Fencehouses, Tyne and Wear, England from 1841 to 1964 on the Leamside line.

== History ==
The station was opened in August 1841 by the Durham Junction Railway. It was situated near the north of the level crossing on Station Avenue. Goods sidings were behind the down platform, while more sidings were behind the up platform, branching off to a mineral depot. Adjacent to the station was also a goods shed with a track running through as well as cattle pens and a loading dock to the south. The goods handled at the station were tar and livestock. The station was initially a stop on the passenger service between Rainton Meadows and Oakwellgate in Gateshead but on 19 June 1844, southbound services to were diverted to Gilesgate and Ferryhill along the newly constructed Newcastle and Darlington Junction Railway. Further extensions to this route ultimately led to creation of the Leamside line.

By 1951, passenger bookings had fallen sharply from 141,237 to 21,340. The Beeching Report dealt severely with the County Durham area of railways, leaving only one passenger service running at 5:01 am. Passenger services were withdrawn on 4 May 1964 and goods traffic followed a month later on 1 June 1964. It was still used for Miners' Gala trains until 18 July 1964.

Preceding station	Disused railways	Following station
Rainton Meadows; Line and station closed	Durham Junction Railway; Rainton Meadows-Oakwellgate	Penshaw; Line and station closed
Leamside; Line and station closed	North Eastern Railway; Leamside line	Penshaw; Line and station closed
