= Biddick Lane railway station =

Disused railway station in Washington, Tyne and Wear

Biddick Lane
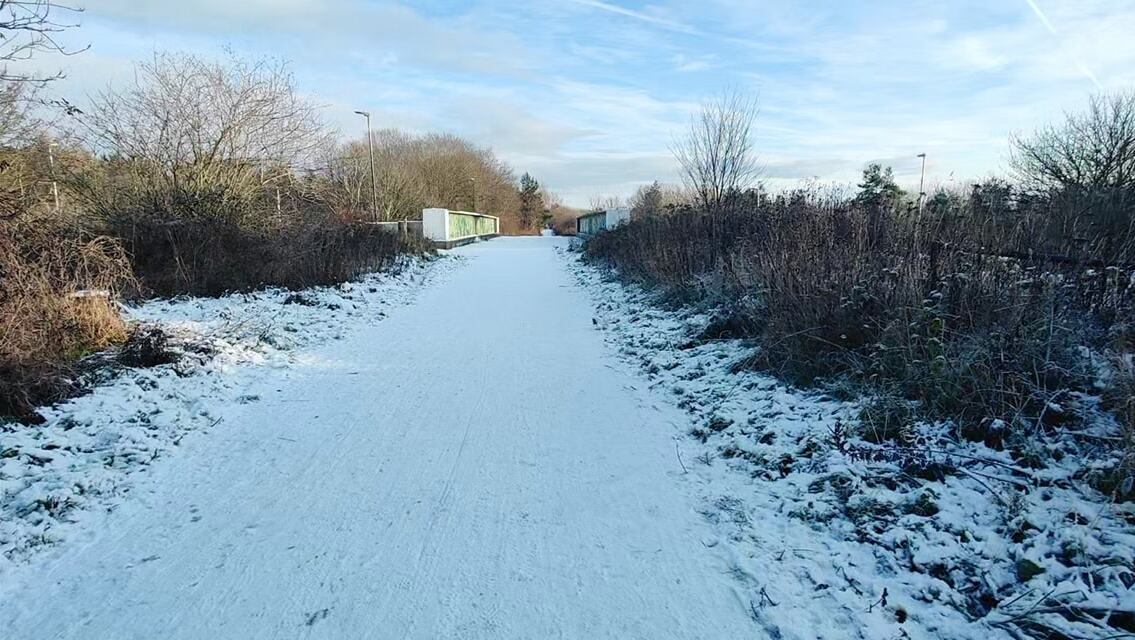
- Site of Biddick Lane station in 2022

General information
- Location: Fatfield, Tyne and Wear; England
- Coordinates: 54.8869°N 1.5199°W
- Platforms: 2

Other information
- Status: Disused

History
- Original company: Stanhope & Tyne Railway
- Pre-grouping: North Eastern Railway

Key dates
- February 1864: Opened
- January 1869: Closed
- 1980s: Line closed
Location

Biddick Lane railway station served the Fatfield area of Washington, in Tyne and Wear (historically County Durham), England. It was on the former Stanhope and Tyne Railway between Washington and Chester-le-Street. The station opened in 1864 and closed shortly after in 1869. The line remained in use for passenger and goods traffic until 1955 when the line was closed to passengers and the 1980s to freight traffic. The station has since been demolished and the line is now in use as the Consett and Sunderland Railway Path between Chester-le-Street and Washington.

Preceding station	Historical railways	Following station
Vigo; Line and station closed	Stanhope and Tyne Railway	Washington (1st station); Line and station closed
