= 1815 Philadelphia train accident =

1815 railway boiler explosion in Philadelphia, England

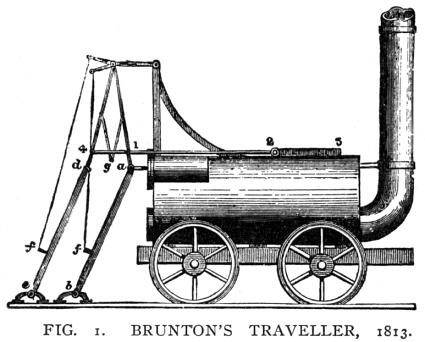
- Brunton's Mechanical Traveller

Details
- Date: 31 July 1815
- Location: Philadelphia, County Durham, England, United Kingdom
- Coordinates: 54.863°N 1.478°W
- Incident type: Railway accident
- Cause: Boiler explosion

Statistics
- Deaths: 13-16

The 1815 Philadelphia train accident occurred on 31 July 1815, in Philadelphia, County Durham, England, when an early experimental railway locomotive, Brunton's Mechanical Traveller, suffered a boiler explosion. This engine, also known as the Steam Horse, ran on four wheels but was pushed by mechanical feet. This was both the first recorded boiler explosion and the first railway accident causing major loss of life with at least 13 people killed (sources differ).

The accident is not included in many texts because it was on an industrial waggonway or plateway, rather than a public railway. Nevertheless, it predated William Huskisson's fatal accident at Parkside by 15 years, and the death toll was not exceeded by any railway accident until 1842 worldwide (see Versailles rail accident), and 1861 in the UK (Clayton Tunnel). It also killed more people than any other UK railway boiler explosion of all time, though 26 were killed in a 1912 boiler explosion in San Antonio, USA.

Most boiler explosions caused severe mechanical damage but often only the locomotive crew suffered physically; however, Brunton's locomotive was surrounded at the time by a crowd of curious sightseers, who formed the majority of the victims. The first high-pressure steam locomotive, Trevithick's Penydarren engine, had only appeared 11 years earlier in 1804, and engineering understanding of the forces and safety risks involved was still primitive.
