= Bournmoor =

Village in County Durham, England

Coordinates: 54.858°N 1.514°W

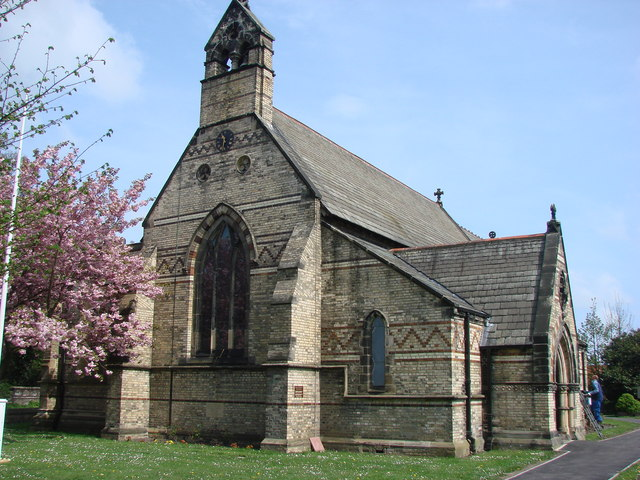
- Church of St Barnabas

- Location within County Durham
- Population: 2,082 (2011)
- OS grid reference: NZ313515
- Unitary authority: County Durham
- Ceremonial county: County Durham
- Region: North East
- Country: England
- Sovereign state: United Kingdom
- Post town: HOUGHTON LE SPRING
- Postcode district: DH4
- Dialling code: 0191
- Police: Durham
- Fire: County Durham and Darlington
- Ambulance: North East
- UK Parliament: North Durham

Bournmoor (/ˈbɜːrnmʊər/ or /ˈbɔːrnmʊər/) is a village in County Durham, England, and is situated a short distance from Chester-le-Street.

It contains St Barnabas' Church, which houses the Frostley Angel. Originally part of the Lambton Castle estate, the village developed from 1783 onwards with the sinking of the first of seven local coal mines that were to make up Lambton Colliery.

For much of the 20th century, "Bournmoor" was known as "Burnmoor", taking its name from the Moorsburn (an alternative name for Hutton Burn which runs through the village.) The local primary school is called Bournmoor Primary School, although the local scout group, formed early in the 20th century, still carries the name "Burnmoor" in its title.

The mid-19th century Ordnance Survey map shows the old core of the village (the staff housing for the Lambton estate) as "Wapping", with the open country to the south of the Sunderland road and north west of Herrington Burn shown as "Bourn Moor" and the colliery complex which was later known as Lambton is shown as Bourn Moor Colliery. The end-19th century map shows the settlement as "Bournmoor". Maps produced after the development of the 'Flowers' estate, dated between 1920 and 1960 show both as "Burnmoor" but they reverted to "Bournmoor" in later maps.

In 1913, the parish councils of "Bourn Moor" and "Morton Grange" complained to the Board of Trade about the poor facilities available to passengers at Fencehouses railway station.

Sporting facilities in the village include cricket, football and tennis clubs situated near to the church.

== Notable people ==
- Thomas Caverhill Jerdon (1811–1872), physician, zoologist and botanist.
