= Vigo railway station (England) =

Disused railway station in Birtley, Tyne and Wear

Vigo
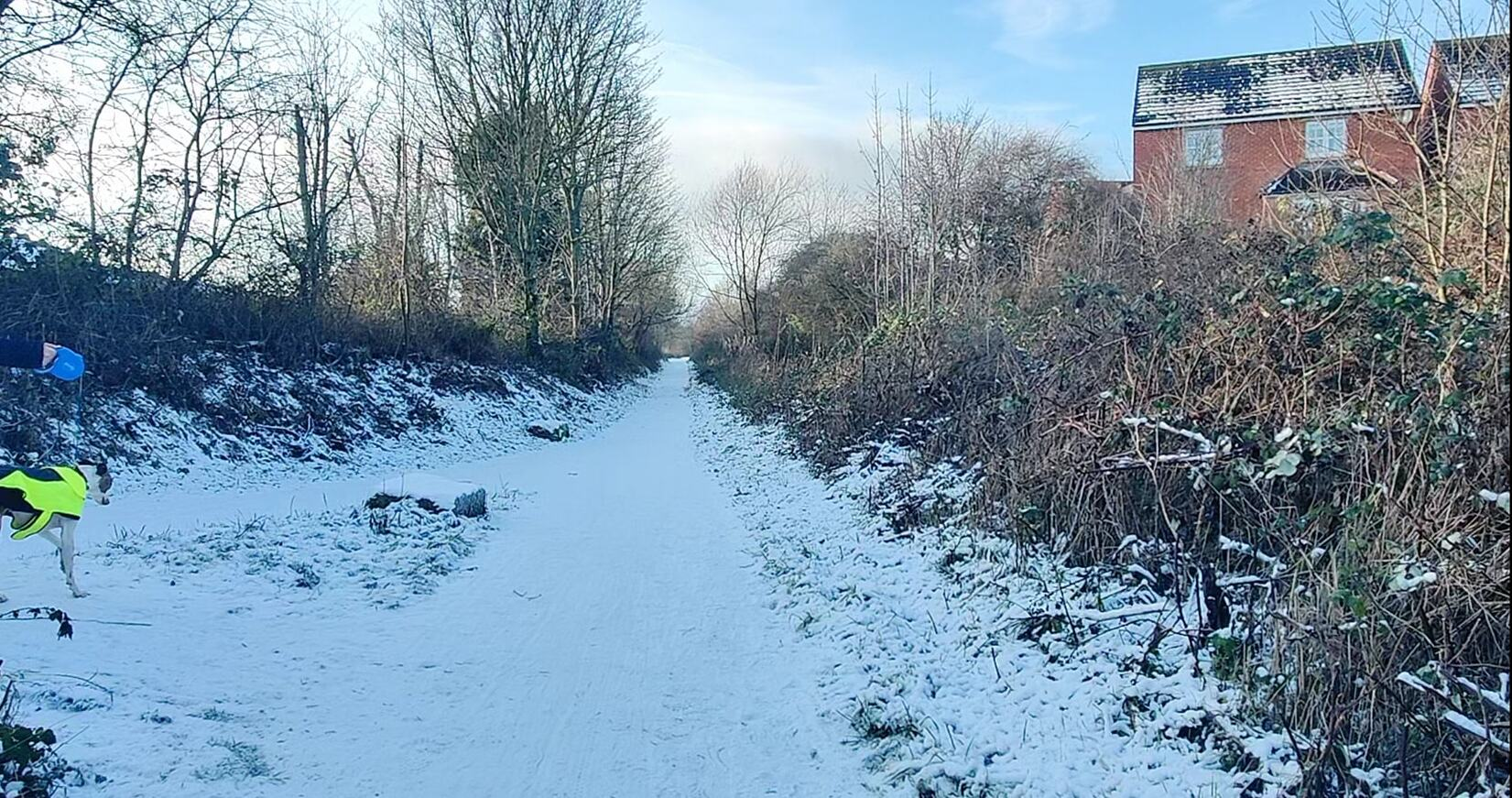
- Site of Vigo station site

General information
- Location: Birtley, Tyne and Wear; England
- Coordinates: 54.8806°N 1.5622°W
- Platforms: ?

Other information
- Status: Disused

History
- Original company: Stanhope & Tyne Railway
- Pre-grouping: North Eastern Railway

Key dates
- April 1835: Opened
- December 1853: Closed
- March 1862: Reopened
- January 1869: Closed
- 1980s: Line closed
Location

Vigo railway station served the Barley Mow and Vigo areas of the town of Birtley in Tyne and Wear (historically County Durham) in England. The station, on the Stanhope and Tyne Railway, was opened in 1835 and closed in 1853. It reopened in 1862 and closed for the final time in 1869.

The line remained open to passengers until 1955 and to freight until the 1980s. The site of the station has since been demolished and the trackbed now forms part of the Consett and Sunderland Railway Path between Washington and Chester-le-Street following the course of the old railway line.

Preceding station	Historical railways	Following station
Biddick Lane; Line and station closed	Stanhope and Tyne Railway	Durham Turnpike; Line and station closed
