= South Pelaw =

Village in County Durham, England

Coordinates: 54.864°N 01.58°W

South Pelaw /ˈpiːlɔː/ is a village in County Durham, in England. It is situated immediately to the north of Chester-le-Street.

== See also ==
- Pelaw
