= Penshaw railway station =

Disused railway station in Penshaw, Tyne and Wear

Penshaw
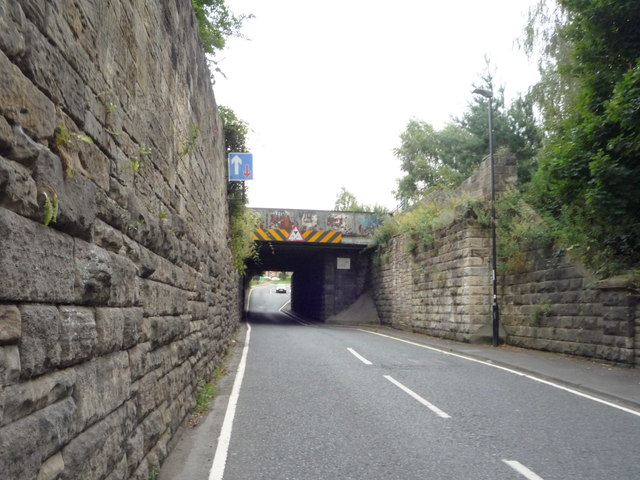
- The site of the railway bridge in 2018

General information
- Location: Penshaw, Tyne and Wear; England
- Coordinates: 54.8748°N 1.5036°W
- Grid reference: NZ319534
- Platforms: 2

Other information
- Status: Disused

History
- Original company: Durham Junction Railway
- Pre-grouping: North Eastern Railway
- Post-grouping: LNER; British Rail (North Eastern)

Key dates
- 9 March 1840: First station opened
- 1 June 1853: Passenger services to Sunderland commence
- 1 July 1881: First station replaced by second station, 10 chains to the south
- 4 May 1964: Second station closed to passengers
- 30 April 1981: Second station closed completely
Location

Penshaw railway station served the village of Penshaw, Tyne and Wear, England from 1840 to 1964 on the Leamside line.

== History ==
The first Penshaw station was opened on 9 March 1840 by the Durham Junction Railway on the north side of the railway bridge over Station Road. It was initially a stop on the passenger service between Rainton Meadows and Oakwellgate in Gateshead but on 19 June 1844, southbound services to were diverted to Gilesgate and Ferryhill along the newly constructed Newcastle and Darlington Junction Railway, allowing through running to London Euston to commence. Further extensions to this route ultimately led to creation of the Leamside line.

On 20 February 1852, the N&DJR opened a branch from the Leamside line, slightly to the north of Penshaw station, to a junction with the Durham & Sunderland Railway at Sunderland although passenger services between Penshaw and Sunderland Fawcett Street did not commence until 1 June 1853.

The original station was replaced by a new one situated south of the bridge over Station Road on 1 July 1881 by the North Eastern Railway. To the east of the station, there were goods sidings and a goods warehouse. To the south of the warehouse was a cattle dock reached by a dead-end siding. As traffic declined the station was demoted to an unstaffed halt on 14 August 1961 and it was shown as an unstaffed stating on the timetable from 18 June 1962, although it was not referred to as a halt. The Beeching Report dealt with a lot of stations in County Durham which included the closure of the Washington Line, which happened on 9 September 1963, though by this time the few remaining services on the Pelaw to Fencehouses route did not actually stop at Pelaw. There were little to no objections to the line closing. The station closed to passengers on 4 May 1964, with the withdrawal of passenger services between Sunderland and Durham, and closed to goods traffic on 30 April 1981.

Preceding station	Disused railways	Following station
Fencehouses; Line and station closed	Durham Junction Railway; Rainton Meadows-Oakwellgate	Washington; Line and station closed
Fencehouses; Line and station closed	North Eastern Railway; Leamside line	Washington; Line and station closed
Terminus	North Eastern Railway; Newcastle & Darlington Junction Railway (Penshaw branch)	Cox Green; Line and station closed
