= Warden Law =

Village in Tyne and Wear, England

Coordinates: 54.843°N 1.429°W

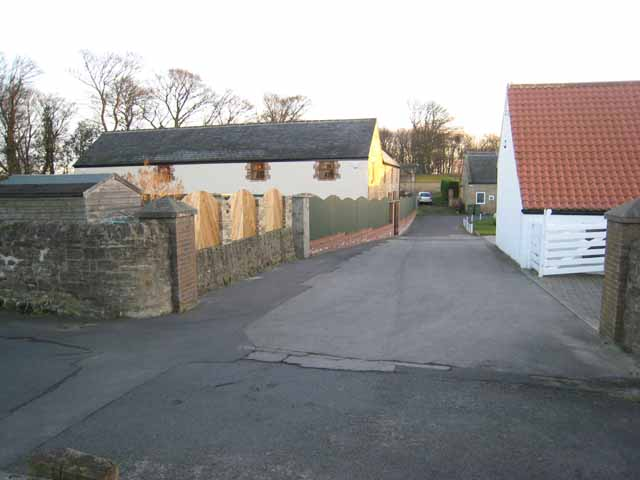

- Location within Tyne and Wear
- Population: 33
- Civil parish: Warden Law
- Metropolitan borough: City of Sunderland
- Metropolitan county: Tyne and Wear
- Region: North East
- Country: England
- Sovereign state: United Kingdom
- Post town: HOUGHTON LE SPRING
- Postcode district: DH5
- Dialling code: 0191
- Police: Northumbria
- Fire: Tyne and Wear
- Ambulance: North East
- UK Parliament: Houghton and Sunderland South

Warden Law is a rural civil parish in the Sunderland district of Tyne and Wear, England. Its small settlements are mostly along the B1404 road between Houghton-le-Spring and Seaham, about 1.5 miles (2.4 km) east of the centre of Houghton and 5 miles (8 km) south-west of Sunderland city centre.

The area has several prehistoric burial sites and other neolithic groundworks and remains, largely destroyed by ploughing. The hill at Wrdlau is mentioned in one account of the 10th-century journey of St Cuthbert's shrine which led to the establishment of Durham Cathedral.

The parish had a population of 33 at the 2001 census. At more recent censuses the population remained less than 100 and therefore details were included in the civil parish of Hetton. In 1872, the population was 73 and Warden-Law was described as a township in Houghton-le-Spring parish, Durham.

It is home to a karting track called Karting North East.
