= Leamside line =

Former railway line in North East England

Leamside Line
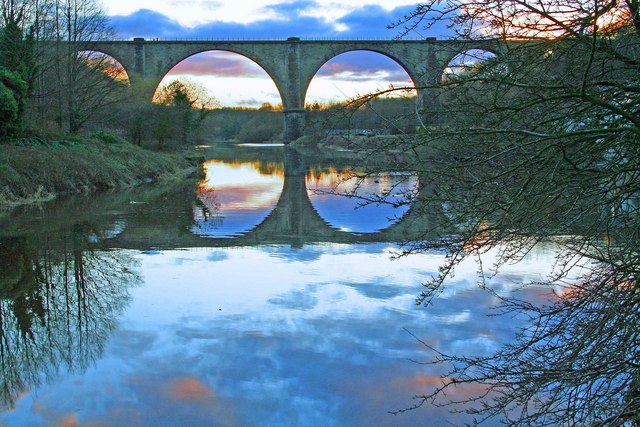
- The Victoria Viaduct over the River Wear.

Overview
- Status: Closed
- Owner: Network Rail
- Locale: County Durham; Tyne and Wear

Service
- Type: Heavy rail
- System: National Rail

History
- Opened: From 1838
- Closed: 1964 (to passengers); 1990s (to goods)

Technical
- Line length: 21 miles (34 km)
- Track gauge: 4 ft 8 1/2 in (1,435 mm) standard gauge
Route map
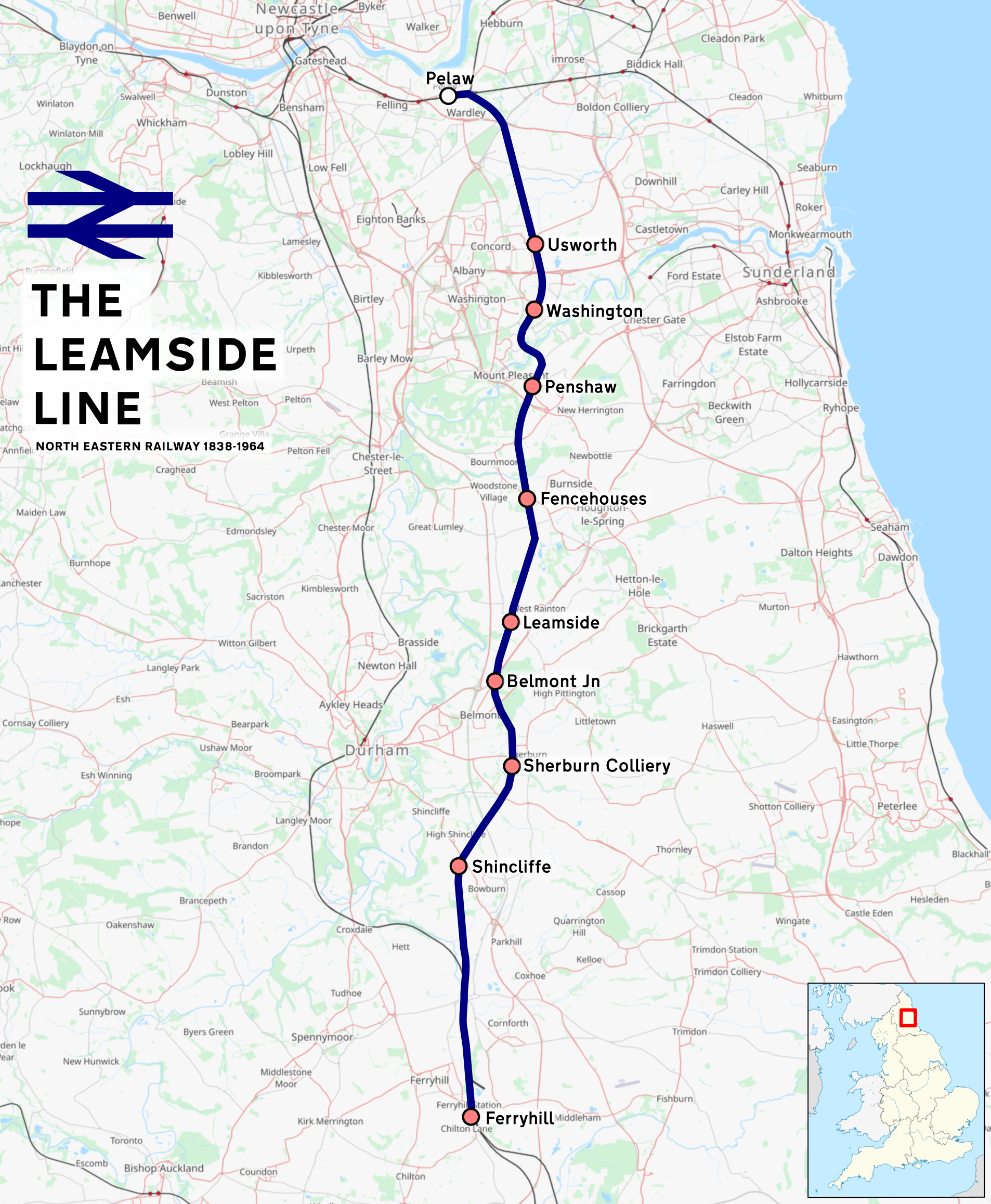
(Click to expand)

The Leamside Line, originally part of the Durham Junction Railway, is a disused railway line, located in the North East of England. The alignment diverges from the East Coast Main Line at Tursdale Junction, travelling a distance of 21 miles (34 kilometres) north through the Durham Coalfield and Washington, prior to joining the Durham Coast Line at Pelaw Junction. The Leamside Line closed to passenger traffic in 1964, under the Beeching cuts.

Part of the line is due to be reopened as an extension of the Tyne & Wear Metro by 2033, although the exact route—and how much of the original line will be reused—is yet to be finalised.

== History ==
The first section of the Leamside Line was opened in August 1838, by the Durham Junction Railway, between Washington on the Stanhope and Tyne Railway, and Rainton Meadows.

In September 1843, the Durham Junction Railway was acquired by the Newcastle and Darlington Junction Railway ahead of the opening of the company's planned route between Newcastle and Darlington. The planned route involved operating over the existing alignment, owned by the Durham Junction Railway, which was operating at a loss, and therefore unable to upgrade the track. Upon completion, passenger services commenced in June 1844, between Darlington and Greenesfield, near Gateshead. The station at Greenesfield was subsequently closed, following the opening of Newcastle, in August 1850.

The line between Washington and Pelaw was opened in September 1849, by the York, Newcastle and Berwick Railway – the successor of the Newcastle and Darlington Junction Railway. Prior to the opening of this line, trains travelled via Brockley Whins.

The stone arch Victoria Viaduct, constructed between 1836 and 1838, is inspired by the design of the Alcántara Bridge in Spain. The line travels 135 feet (41 metres) over the River Wear, carried on four arches, spanning between 100 and 160 feet (30 and 49 metres).

The Leamside Line constituted part of the original East Coast Main Line route from London to Edinburgh, until 1872, eventually being incorporated into the North Eastern Railway. The line's main source of revenue, as with most of the early railways, was mineral traffic, principally coal from the Durham Coalfield. The line was linked to many private colliery branch lines and waggonways.

In 1872, the North Eastern Railway line between Bishop Auckland and Gateshead, as well as the Croxdale link, became part of the East Coast Main Line. Thereafter, the Leamside Line continued to carry local passenger services and freight traffic, as well as serving as a diversionary route from the East Coast Main Line.

In 1941, passenger services between Ferryhill and Leamside were withdrawn, resulting in the closure of stations at Shincliffe (in June 1941), and Sherburn Colliery (in July 1941) to passengers. Leamside was the next station on the line to close, in October 1953, to both goods and passengers. Usworth and Washington followed around 10 years later, closing in September 1963. Penshaw and Fencehouses subsequently closed to passengers in May 1964. This marked the line's closure to passenger traffic, which occurred with the Penshaw–Sunderland line.

Ferryhill station, being at the junction with the modern East Coast Main Line, remained open for a further three years, closing to passengers in March 1967. The station closed to goods in the 1980s. Coal and other freight continued to be carried for some years but declined due to the gradual demise of the Durham Coalfield between the 1970s and 1990s. In the late 1980s the line was used at weekends for East Coast Main Line trains that were diverted due to electrification of the line between Newcastle and Darlington, especially in 1989 to avoid Durham when there was a major remodelling of the track through Durham station.

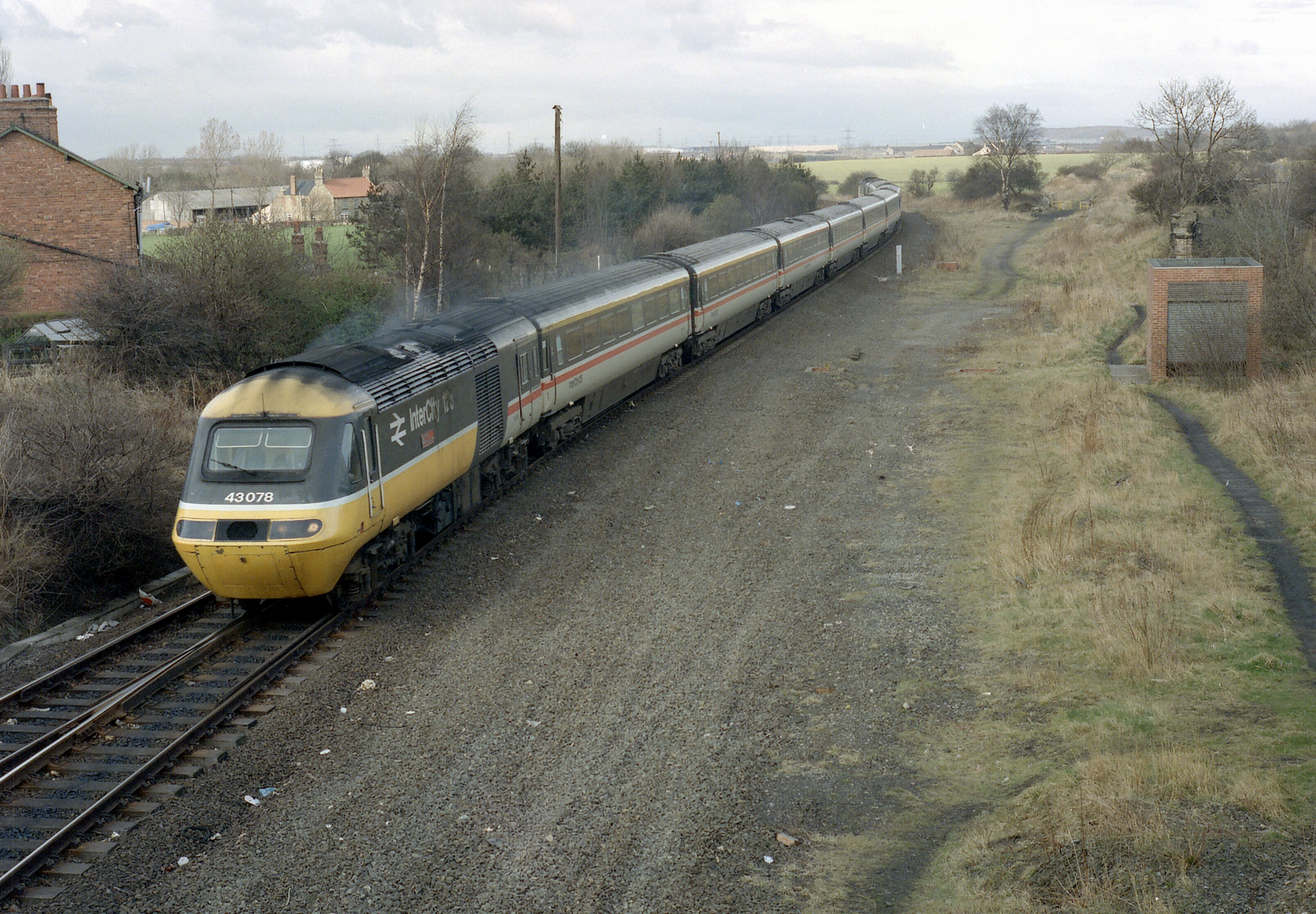
InterCity 125 train just south of the Victoria Viaduct diverted onto the Leamside line in 1989

In the early 1990s, and following the closure of the Freightliner terminal at Follingsby, near Wardley, the Leamside Line was mothballed almost entirely – the terminal being the recipient of most of the line's traffic during the final years of operation. A short section of the Leamside Line from Pelaw Junction remained in operation, serving the open-cast coal mine at Wardley, which has also since closed.

== After closure ==
Following the line's closure in the early 1990s, the double track was reduced to a single line in some places, with the track severed at some level crossings along the line. Initially, the line's engineering features remained intact. However, the embankment carrying the line over Moors Burn, located around 500 yards (460 m) from to the north of the former station at Fencehouses, had partially collapsed, leaving the former down track suspended. Substantial parts of the line and infrastructure were also missing from around the former station at Usworth, which has also become severely overgrown.

In January 2003, a large section of track, located to the south of Penshaw, was stolen over a six-day period. In late 2012 and early 2013, around 16 miles (26 kilometres) of track was lifted, with Network Rail insisting that this would have no effect on any future re-opening plans, as track renewal would be necessary. The line is currently safeguarded from development, with no sales of land attached to the line.

The former Freightliner terminal at Follingsby, near Wardley, is currently under development, with plans to construct an Amazon warehouse and fulfilment centre – leading to the potential creation of over 1,000 jobs. The site of the former open-cast coal mine at Wardley is also now under private development.

== Proposed re-opening, upgrade and development ==
Since the line's closure in the early 1990s, a number of proposals to re-open the Leamside Line have been put forward, including plans by AECOM, ATOC, Durham County Council, Railtrack and Tyne and Wear PTE. The line has been considered for a number of potential uses, including a regional suburban rail service linking Tyneside and Teesside, a diversionary freight route for the East Coast Main Line, and an extension to the Tyne and Wear Metro network.

Part of the Durham to Sunderland Line, which diverged from the Leamside Line to the south-east of the Victoria Viaduct, re-opened in March 2002, following the Tyne and Wear Metro's extension to Wearside. The line terminates at South Hylton, around 3 miles (4.8 km) from the former junction with the Leamside Line. In early 2020, discussions between councils began, looking into the potential extension of the Tyne and Wear Metro network to the International Advanced Manufacturing Park in Washington, using the former alignment of the Leamside Line.

In March 2020, a bid was made to the Restoring Your Railway fund to get funds for a feasibility study into reinstating the line. This bid was unsuccessful.

From being elected in 2019 the North of Tyne Mayor, Jamie Driscoll, campaigned for the reopening of the line.

At the Conservative Party conference in 2023, The Party announced plans to re-open the line as part of its "Network North" programme. However, the following day the Government backtracked and said they were only "looking into it".

In July 2024 North East mayor Kim McGuinness announced that around £8 million would be spent planning to bring part of the line back into use as part of the Tyne and Wear Metro to Washington. The plan would expand the Metro network from its current endpoint in South Hylton through to Washington, the fourth biggest town in the UK without a railway station, then onto Follingsby and rejoin at Pelaw, at an estimated cost of £745 million.

In June 2025, the North East Combined Authority (NECA) confirmed that it had secured £1.85 billion from the government for investment in public transport, with £900m allocated towards building and opening the Tyne & Wear Metro extension to Washington by 2033.

In January 2026 Heidi Alexander confirmed that the business case for the reopening of the Leamside line would be developed alongside the Northern Powerhouse Rail project.
