= Cox Green, Tyne and Wear =

Cox Green
- Village
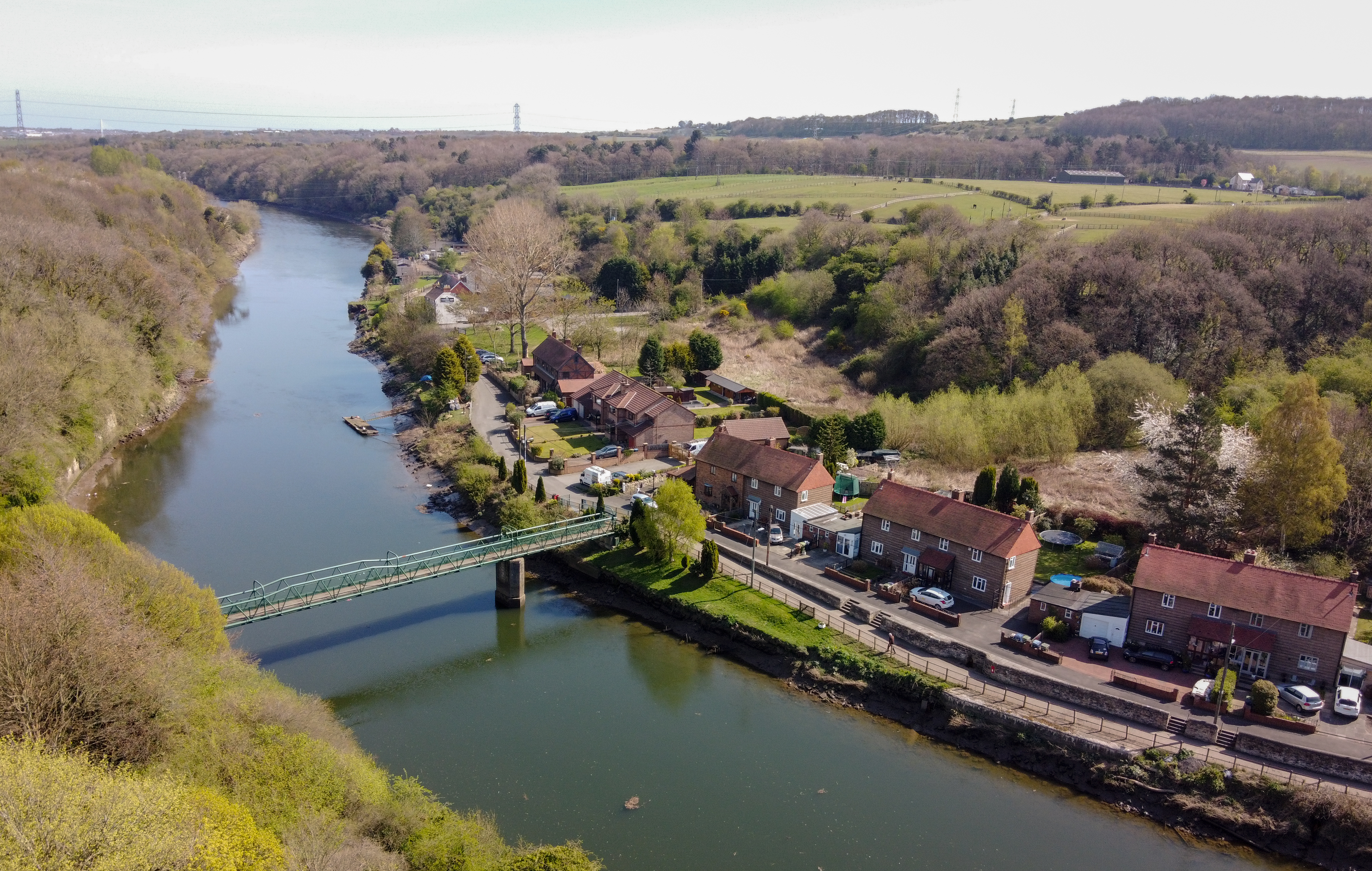
- Cox Green from the air

- Location in Tyne and Wear
- Coordinates: 54.890°N 1.483°W
- OS grid reference: NZ332552
- Sovereign state: United Kingdom
- Country: England
- District: Tyne and Wear

Cox Green is a village in the Sunderland district, Tyne and Wear, England, situated on the south bank of the River Wear between Penshaw and Offerton. The village is linked to Washington Staithes on the north bank of the river, by the Cox Green Footbridge. It is primarily a residential village.

== Etymology ==
Cox Green is from Old English cocc "cock" (crest of a hill) in the plural form coccs (the plural form represented by modern "s"). Due to corruption of the name over the years, the name is similar to the modern surname Cox. The name was recorded as Cosse in 1108, and Couuse in 1146 and Cokksgrene in 1248. 'Green' is a modern addition, referring to the village. As of January 2010, there are 23 people living in the village. There is a pub called the Oddfellows Arms.

== Roads & transport ==
Cox Green is situated to the north of the A183 road, about a mile west of its intersection with the main A19 trunk road. It had a railway station from the 1850s until 1964, which unsurprisingly fell victim to the Beeching Axe.

== Shipbuilding ==
In 1840, William Doxford founded his shipbuilding company and started building ships at Cox Green. He went bankrupt in 1841, but resumed shipbuilding in 1845. In 1857, he moved his shipbuilding yard from Cox Green to Pallion.

== Sources ==
- Clark, Andrew (2002). The People's History - Sunderland Shipyards. Seaham: The People's History Ltd. ISBN 1-902527-00-3.
- Dodds, Glen Lyndon (2011). A History of Sunderland (Third ed.). Sunderland: Albion Press. ISBN 978-0-9525122-2-6.
