= Rainton Meadows railway station =

Short-lived railway station in West Rainton, County Durham

Rainton Meadows

General information
- Location: West Rainton, County Durham; England
- Coordinates: 54.8241°N 1.4987°W
- Grid reference: NZ323478
- Platforms: 1

Other information
- Status: Disused

History
- Original company: Durham Junction Railway
- Pre-grouping: Newcastle and Darlington Junction Railway

Key dates
- 9 March 1840: Opened
- 19 June 1844: Closed
Location

Rainton Meadows railway station served the village of West Rainton, County Durham, England from 1840 to 1844 on the Durham Junction Railway.

== History ==
The station opened on 9 March 1840 by the Durham Junction Railway. It was situated between Marks Lane and Meadows Lane. It was never mentioned in Bradshaw's railway guide but it was mentioned in Robinson's and Branding Junction's guides. The station closed on 19 June 1844 but a siding continued use as a dumping ground until the late twentieth century.

Preceding station	Disused railways	Following station
Terminus	Durham Junction Railway; Rainton Meadows-Oakwellgate	Fencehouses; Line and station closed
