= Philadelphia, Tyne and Wear =

Village in Tyne and Wear, England

Coordinates: 54.865°N 1.4833°W

Philadelphia
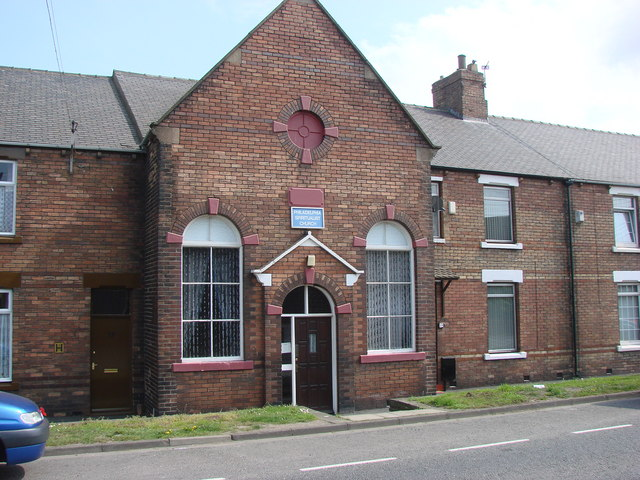
- Philadelphia Spiritualist Church, Chapel Row

- Location within Tyne and Wear
- OS grid reference: NZ333522
- Metropolitan borough: City of Sunderland
- Metropolitan county: Tyne and Wear
- Region: North East
- Country: England
- Sovereign state: United Kingdom
- Post town: HOUGHTON LE SPRING
- Postcode district: DH4
- Dialling code: 0191
- Police: Northumbria
- Fire: Tyne and Wear
- Ambulance: North East
- UK Parliament: Houghton and Washington East

Philadelphia is a village in the City of Sunderland, England. It lies on the A182 road between Newbottle and Shiney Row. It is named after the American city of Philadelphia.

== History ==
Unlike nearby Washington, it post-dates its namesake in the United States, being named during the American Revolutionary War either, to commemorate the British capture of the city, or to declare allegiance with the cause of colonial independence, although there is no firm evidence either way. The village cricket field is named "Bunker Hill", after another famous battle in that war.

What may have started as a single farm, expanded substantially by the installing of 2 pits named: 'Margret' or 'Peggy', sunk in the 18th century; and 'Dorethea' or 'Dolly', sunk in the 1810s. by 1821 the population had risen to 2,306. In 1816 the town was described by Robert Surtees, as follows:

A little to the North of Newbottle, below the brow of the hill, lies Philadelphia-Row, one of those settlements provided by the coal-owners for their workmen, who live here as a distinct class in society, almost entirely separated from the agricultural part of the community. These colonies form at every point the strongest contrast to the varied and picturesque appearance of the genuine village—consisting, in general, of long uniform lines of low brick buildings, running along each side of a public road, black with coal-dust.

— Robert Surtees, The history and antiquities of the County Palatine of Durham (1816)

Philadelphia was the place of the 1815 Philadelphia train accident, the explosion of the boiler of an early steam locomotive. The number of deaths (16, other sources state 13) was the highest in a railway accident until 1842.
