= List of villages in the Durham Dales =

A list of villages in the Durham Dales, England.

== A ==
Allensford, Aukside

== B ==
Barnigham, Bedburn, Benfieldside, Boldron, Bowbank, Bowes, Bowlees, Bridgehill, Brignall, Brotherlee

== C ==
Close House, Copley, Copthill, Cornriggs, Cowshill, Cornsay, Cornsay Colliery, Cotherstone, Craigside, Crawleyside

== D ==
Daddry Shield, Delves Lane, Dent Bank, Dipton

== E ==
East Blackdene, East Briscoe, Eastgate, Edmundbyers, Egglesburn, Eggleston, Escomb, Esh, Ettersgill

== F ==
Fir Tree, Forest-in-Teesdale, Frosterley

== G ==
Gilmonby, Grassholme, Greta Bridge

== H ==
Hamsterley, Hamsterley, Consett, Harwood, Healeyfield, High Dyke, Hill End, Hill Top, Holwick, Horsleyhope, Hunderthwaite, Hunstanworth, Hury, Hutton Magna

== I ==
Inkerman, Ireshopeburn

== K ==
Kinninvie

== L ==
Laithkirk, Lanehead, Langdon Beck, Lartington, Little Newsham, Low Etherley

== M ==
Mickleton, Middle Side, Morley, Muggleswick

== N ==
New House, Newbiggin

== O ==
Ovington

== p ==
Pontop Pike

== R ==
Ramshaw, Romaldkirk, Rookhope

== S ==
Scargill, Shotley Bridge, Snaisgill, St John's Chapel, Staindrop, Stainton, Startforth

== T ==
The Grove, Thornley, Thringarth, Toft Hill, Townfield

== W ==
Waskerley, Wearhead, West Blackdene, West Pasture, Westgate, Westwick, Whorlton, Winston, Witton-le-Wear, Wolsingham, Woodland, Wycliffe
