= List of crossings of the River Wear =

This is a list of crossings of the River Wear, heading upstream from Sunderland, including road and rail bridges and fords.

== North Sea to Sunderland ==
Crossing	Carries	Location	Built	Coordinates	Photograph
Wearmouth Bridge	A1018 road, A183 road, National Cycle Route 1	Wearside	1929		
Monkwearmouth Bridge	Durham Coast Line, Green line	Monkwearmouth	1879		
Keel Crossing					
Queen Alexandra Bridge	Road, A1231 road (until Aug 2018), Queen Alexandra Bridge Branch (until 1921)	Wearside	10 Jun 1909		
Northern Spire Bridge	A1231 road, Bicycle path, sidewalk	Wearside	28 Aug 2018		
Hylton Viaduct	A19 road, sidewalk	South Hylton	1974		

== Sunderland to Chester-le-Street ==
Crossing	Carries	Location	Built	Coordinates	Photograph
Cox Green Footbridge	Footpath	Cox Green	1958		
Victoria Viaduct	Leamside line	Wearside	Aug 1838		
Penshaw Bridge	Station Road	Sunderland	1889		
Chartershaugh Bridge	A182 road	Sunderland	1975		
New Bridge		Lambton Castle			
Lamb Bridge		Lambton Castle	1819		
Chester New Bridge		Bournmoor			
Lambton Bridge	A183 road	Chester-le-Street	1926		
A1(M) bridge over the Wear	A1(M) motorway	County Durham	1968		
New Lumley Bridge	B1284 road	County Durham	1997		

== Chester-le-Street to Durham ==
Crossing	Carries	Location	Built	Coordinates	Photograph
Cocken Bridge	Cocken Road	Plawsworth	1886		
Finchale Bridge	Sidewalk	Finchale Priory	1937		
Brasside Bridge		County Durham	1850s		
Belmont Viaduct	Leamside line	Framwellgate Moor	1856		
Penny Ferry Bridge	Footbridge	Durham	2002		
Milburngate Bridge	A690 road	County Durham	1967		
Framwellgate Bridge	Silver Street	City of Durham	15th century		
Prebends Bridge	South Bailey	County Durham	1772		
Kingsgate Bridge	Footpath	County Durham	1967		
Elvet Bridge	Elvet Bridge	Durham	1160		
New Elvet Bridge	New Elvet	Durham	1975		
Baths Bridge	Footpath	County Durham	1960s		
Maiden Castle bridge	Path	County Durham	1974		
Shincliffe Bridge	A177 road	Shincliffe	1826		

== Durham to Bishop Auckland ==
Crossing	Carries	Location	Built	Coordinates	Photograph
Croxdale Road Bridge	A167 road	Croxdale	1924		
Sunderland Bridge	Weardale Way	Sunderland Bridge	14th century		
Croxdale Viaduct	East Coast Main Line	Croxdale	1872		
Page Bank Bridge	Whitworth Lane	Page Bank	1995		
Jubilee Bridge	Cobey's Carr Lane	Willington	1990		
Pay Bridge	Footpath	County Durham			
Newton Cap Railway Viaduct	A689 road (from 1995)	Bishop Auckland			
Newton Cap Bridge		Bishop Auckland			

== Bishop Auckland to Stanhope ==
Crossing	Carries	Location	Built	Coordinates	Photograph
Witton Park Ford		Witton Park			
Witton Park Bridge		Witton Park	23 Aug 1904		
Witton Park Viaduct	Weardale Railway	Witton Park	1854		
Witton Bridge		Witton-le-Wear, Hamsterley, Evenwood and Barony			
A68 Wear bridge	A68 road	County Durham			
Harperley Footbridge	Weardale Way				
Wolsingham Rail Bridge	Weardale Railway	Wolsingham	1847		
Wolsingham Bridge		Wolsingham	1894		
Holebeck Mill Bridge		Wear Valley	1990s		
Broadwood Bridge		Frosterley	1970s		
Frosterley Ford		Frosterley			
Broadwood Rail Bridge	Weardale Railway	Frosterley	1847		
Kenneth Bridge	Footpath	Frosterley			
Frosterley Bridge		Frosterley	1813		
Rogerley railway bridge	Weardale Railway	Shittlehope	1862		
Gas Works Bridge		Shittlehope	1958		
Stanhope East Railway Bridge	Weardale Railway	Stanhope			
Stanhope Central Railway Bridge	Weardale Railway	Stanhope	1895		
Stanhope Footbridge	Footpath	Stanhope			
Stanhope Ford		Stanhope			
Stanhope Bridge	B6278 road	Stanhope	14th century		
Stanhope West Railway Bridge	Weardale Railway	Stanhope	1895		

== Stanhope to Wearhead ==
Crossing	Carries	Location	Built	Coordinates	Photograph
Hag Bridge		Eastgate	1996		
Eastgate Railway Bridge	Weardale Railway	Eastgate	1895		
Eastgate Conveyor Bridge	Belt conveyor	Eastgate	1964		
Brotherlee Footbridge	Footpath	Brotherlee	1990s		
Haswick's Bridge		Westgate			
Britton Bridge and ford		Westgate			
Waterside House Footbridge	Footpath	Stanhope			
Daddry Shield Bridge	A689 road	Daddry Shield			
Huntshield Ford		St John's Chapel			
Ponderlane Bridge	Footpath	Stanhope			
Broken Way Footbridge	Footpath	Stanhope			
Bridge End Footbridge	Footpath	Stanhope			
Bridge End Ford		Stanhope			
Coronation Bridge		Stanhope	1838		
Blackdene Mine Bridge		Ireshopeburn			
West Blackdene Bridge		West Blackdene	18th century		
Sparks Farm Bridge		Stanhope	1986		
Wearhead Bridge	A689 road	Wearhead	1989		
