= Bridge End, County Durham =

Hamlet in County Durham, England

Coordinates: 54.724°N 1.967°W

Bridge End
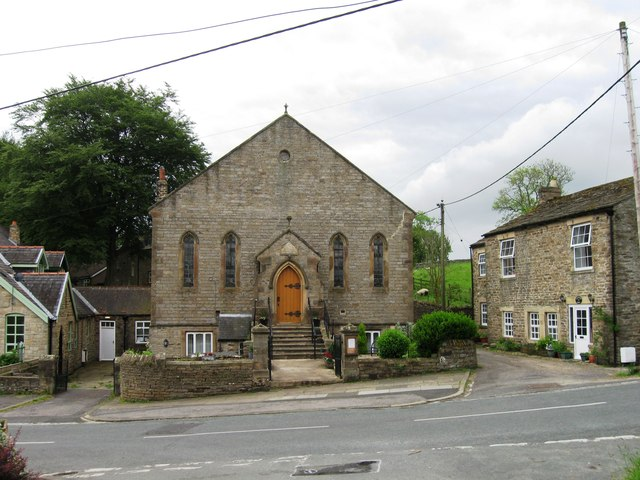

- Location within County Durham
- OS grid reference: NZ022366
- Civil parish: Stanhope
- Unitary authority: County Durham
- Ceremonial county: Durham
- Region: North East
- Country: England
- Sovereign state: United Kingdom
- Post town: BISHOP AUCKLAND
- Postcode district: DL13
- Police: Durham
- Fire: County Durham and Darlington
- Ambulance: North East
- UK Parliament: North West Durham

Bridge End is a hamlet in the civil parish of Stanhope, in County Durham, England. It is situated on the south bank of the River Wear, on the other side of Weardale from Frosterley, and near Hill End and White Kirkley.
