= White Kirkley =

Village in County Durham, England

Coordinates: 54.718°N 1.959°W

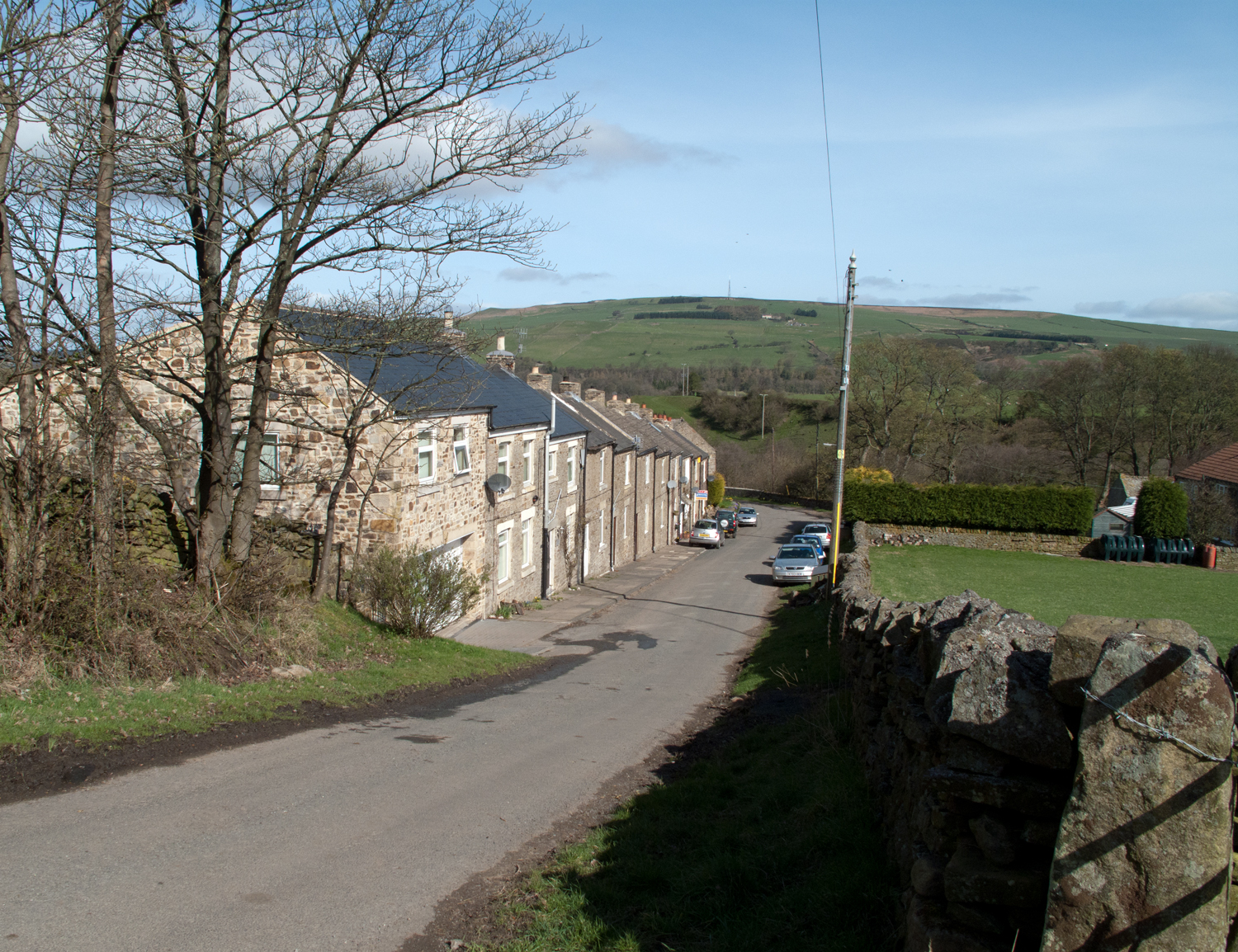
- Terrace of houses in White Kirkley

- Location within County Durham
- OS grid reference: NZ027359
- Civil parish: Stanhope
- Unitary authority: County Durham
- Ceremonial county: County Durham
- Region: North East
- Country: England
- Sovereign state: United Kingdom
- Post town: Darlington
- Postcode district: DL13
- Police: Durham
- Fire: County Durham and Darlington
- Ambulance: North East

White Kirkley is a small village in the civil parish of Stanhope, in County Durham, England. It is situated on the south side of Weardale, opposite Frosterley, and close to Hill End.

== History ==
Records of the area surrounding White Kirkley go back as far as 1680, the estate owner John Mowbrey of Low Bishopley prepares an agreement with Thomas Shafto of Newcastle upon Tyne to allow the procurement of lead ore from the land surrounding Stanhope. Soon after it appears that Thomas Shafto dies around 1706 passing his share of the mines to this son Francis Shafto, at the same time John Mowbrey is described in terms suggesting that he is now dead, confusion being that his heir appears with the same name. The lands however remain over the centuries under the ownership of the Mowbrey family.

The land on which White Kirkley stands was formally known as 'cruc hyll', with the earliest remains of several close quarries to the south and east. An incline was very visible during the early 1800s - which can still be seen climbing the hill at the south end of the hamlet. Two small adits appear on the land directly south near to the top of the old quarry tip along with a mine shaft, the remains of another level and outcrop are to the east of the road.

The Bishopley quarry near Miln House was ceasing production in or before 1861, and the commissioning of building works had begun on the new village of White Kirkley, this was to coincide with the opening of the new Bishopley Crag quarry as well as the expansion of the larger Stanhope quarries. Ordnance Survey produced maps of the area from 1861 and recovered the area in 1897 and 1898 leaving benchmarks in their wake; of interesting note is that in 1861 Bishopley Crag is not in existence, and the two adits near to the mine shaft no longer exist around the incline to the south of White Kirkley (even though they are still accessible) and also the Ordnance Survey appear to have moved or replaced some of the benchmarks between 1895 and 1897.

1897 brings the long closure of Bishopley quarry, the large expansion of Bishopley Crag quarry as well as the now recorded adits and shafts of the unknown mines about the old quarry to the south.

1921, OS maps show that all work has ceased, the Bishopley Crag as well as all of the local mines (including that of the well known and larger Harehope mine) are now marked as 'disused'.

The Ordnance Survey of 1897 shows White Kirkley with the full street layout of 21 houses and one small chapel. Over the years the hamlet has been known locally by a variety of names including 'White Kirtle', 'White Kettle' and of course 'White Kirkley'. The word 'Kirk' means 'chapel' and is present in many of the northern village names to denote the existence of a place of worship in the village.

The streets were given the names 'West Row' (the longer of the two rows) and 'East Row' (the shorter row) - these also can be traced to being referred to at the time of 'long row' and 'short row'. The houses were very basic, built of stone with only one room downstairs and one room upstairs. The downstairs unusually had raised timber flooring instead of flagstone because of the dampness of the underlying earth, they are all fitted with an inglenook style fireplace that stands on a stone hearth with exposed beams to the ceiling and access to the upper floor via a ladder. Water was supplied by one stand pipe on the opposite side of the road to West Row, but there was no sewerage means provided.

The chapel was a small building that stood on its own between the first house of West Row and White Kirkley farm and was of similar build to the houses. A curiosity was that it had a long slim built and attached outbuilding directly behind the rear wall that ran towards the west. It had little in the way of heating with no chimney and has small cut-aways in the walls in which candles were placed. It was built 'end on' compared to the rest of the street with a grander frontage so that in traditional Christian practice would face east and west.

The houses of 'East Row' were built back to back and were of smaller construction to that of West Row, many were occupied by larger families and were eventually knocked into one through the back wall to form a larger four room house. All of the housing unusually (for the time) had allotments or gardens - with some of the tenants having built outbuildings to aid in their day to day living requirements. The gable end house East Row had a stone 'lean-to' which can clearly be seen on the land plans of 1861 as well as on the photograph above.

The village experienced trouble during the 1920s because many of the local quarries were beginning to close. Some of the inhabitants left for local towns in search of work, which reduced the rental income for the lord of the manor, now a Sir George Robert Mowbrey of Warennes Wood, county Berks.

In 1923, the owner of the properties 1&2 of West Row purchased each property for a sum of £60.00. An order of extinguishment of manorial incidents was issued for £209.11.1d in 1939 with compensation paid to Sir Robert Gray Cornish Mowbrey that should include the 'Ores, Minerals and Earth' beneath the houses. This was a common practice from a bill issued in 1922 that allowed a home owner to purchase the land beneath their house from the lord of the manor in respect of a 'compensation' payment to be paid. View the last will and testament for more information on land ownership at this time, here.

During the 1950s, the village of White Kirkley had fallen to such level of dis-repair that it was elected to pursue an order of closure upon the inhabitants, this was another common act that was taking place over many small towns over the North by which a decision was made that any housing that did not meet certain sanitary criteria including sewerage or other means would be compulsorily purchased by the council and probably pulled down. In the case of White Kirkley, the occupants were re-housed in a new estate in Frosterley whilst their houses lay empty.

1963. Many of the houses of White Kirkley remain - but most of the houses are being used for farm storage. Many retain their timber-work but the small chapel is without a front wall and much of its second floor- having been dismantled and the stone masonry being used to maintain other structures. East Row has suffered the worse with the loss of many of the roofs whilst West Row is more sheltered.

1963 on, Many of the dwellings were beginning to attract attention from new buyers, in 1964 some of the houses were sold by the owner, Sir Robert Mowbrey to private purchasers where by large scale modernization took place - drains and a sewer system were installed (via a cesspit located next to the railway and river) and running water supply into the houses. British Telecom provided telecommunications to the street as late as 8 August 1995 - though it is unclear if this was to replace an older GPO system.
