= Copthill =

Coordinates: 54.759°N 2.227°W

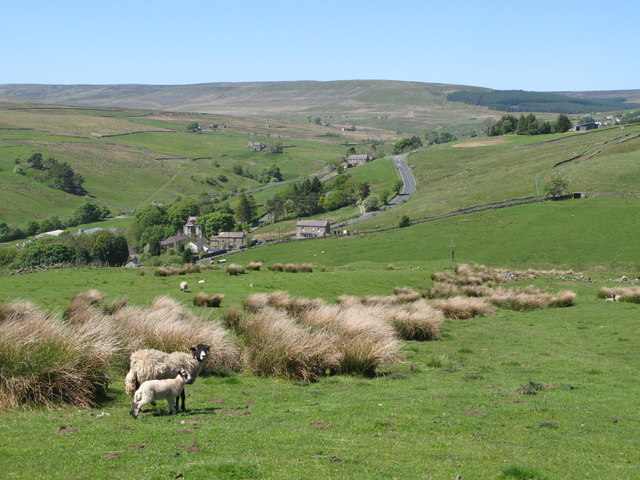

- Location within County Durham
- OS grid reference: NY855405
- Civil parish: Stanhope
- District: County Durham
- Unitary authority: Durham
- Region: North East
- Country: England
- Sovereign state: United Kingdom
- Post town: DARLINGTON
- Postcode district: DL13
- Police: Durham
- Fire: County Durham and Darlington
- Ambulance: North East

Copthill is a hamlet in the civil parish of Stanhope, in County Durham, England. It is situated on the north side of Weardale, between Cowshill and Cornriggs.
