= East Blackdene =

Hamlet in County Durham, England

Coordinates: 54.741°N 2.180°W

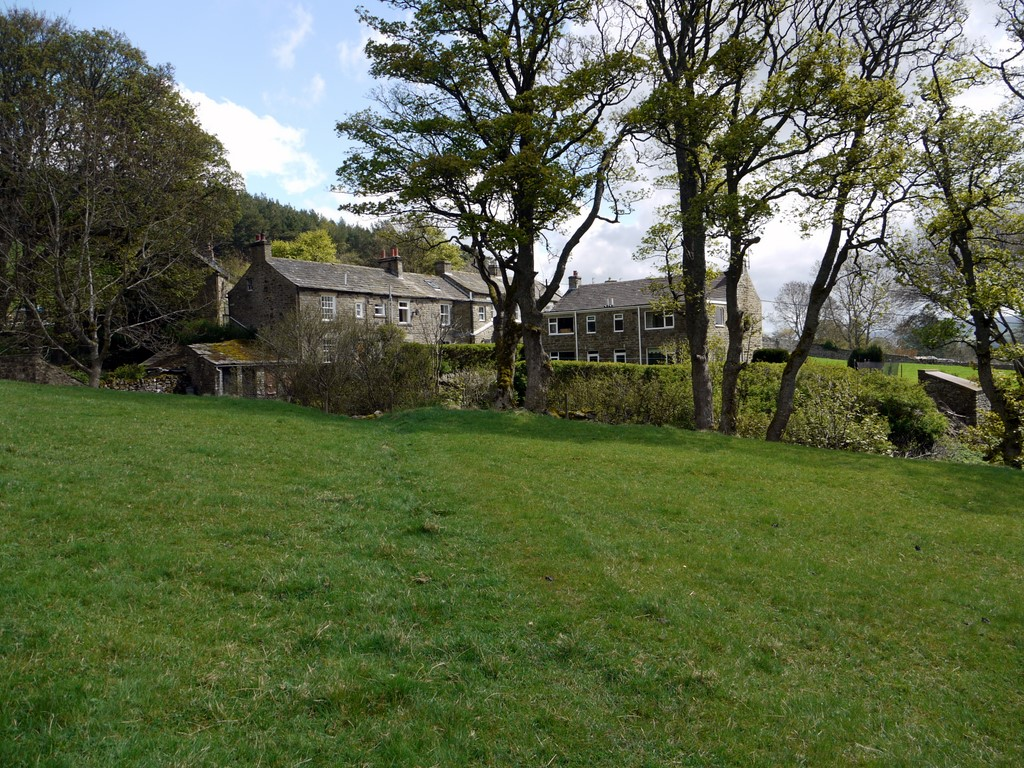

- Location within County Durham
- OS grid reference: NY885385
- Civil parish: Stanhope
- Unitary authority: County Durham
- Ceremonial county: County Durham
- Region: North East
- Country: England
- Sovereign state: United Kingdom
- Post town: DARLINGTON
- Postcode district: DL13
- Police: Durham
- Fire: County Durham and Darlington
- Ambulance: North East

East Blackdene is a hamlet in the civil parish of Stanhope, in County Durham, England. It is situated to the north of the River Wear, on the opposite side of Weardale from St John's Chapel. The land would have originally been one farm owned by the Bishop of Durham, but was subdivided through the 15th-17th centuries, resulting in a small cluster-settlement. This is similar to West Blackdene.
