= North of England Lead Mining Museum =

Lead mining museum

Killhope the North of England Lead Mining Museum
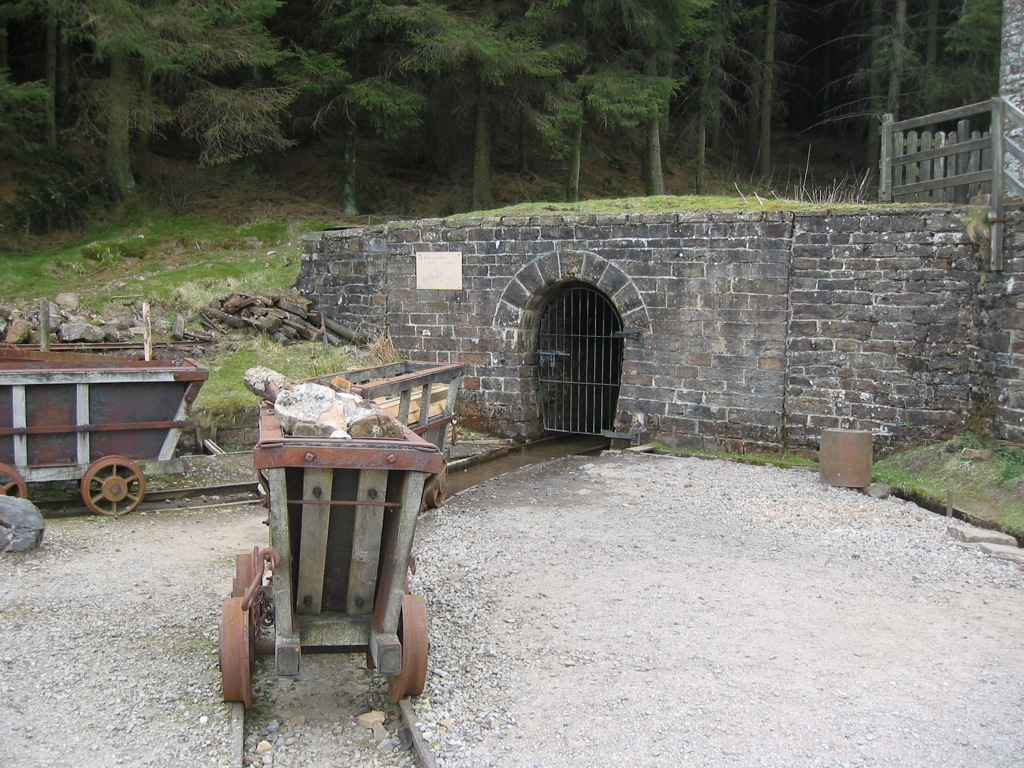
- The entrance to Park Level Mine at the North of England Lead Mining Museum

- Location within County Durham
- Established: 1984
- Location: Nr Cowshill, County Durham
- Coordinates: 54°46′59″N 2°16′23″W
- Type: Mining
- Public transit access: Bus, terminates at Cowshill
- Website: Killhope Official Site

The North of England Lead Mining Museum, better known as Killhope, is an industrial museum near the village of Cowshill, County Durham, England. The museum stands on the site of the former Park Level Mine, which is being restored to show the workings of a 19th-century lead mine.

== Location ==
The museum is located alongside the Killhope Burn, about 4 km upstream from Cowshill, and is accessible via the A689 road between Stanhope, County Durham and Alston, Cumbria.

It is situated in the heart of the North Pennines, Area of Outstanding Natural Beauty, an area that, in 2003, was designated the first Geopark in Great Britain.

The museum is open every day between 1 April and 31 October, but is closed (except to pre-booked groups) during the winter months, when weather conditions in the area can be severe. A bus service operates through Weardale; services usually terminate at Cowshill, but some summer services will continue to Killhope on request.

== History ==
Lead ore in the North Pennines occurs in mineralised veins within the Carboniferous rocks of the area. Until the mid-19th century, exploitation of these ore bodies was mostly confined to surface excavations and vertical shafts. From 1818, mining in the area was controlled by W B Lead Co, a mining company established by the Blacketts, a prominent Newcastle family which had leased mining rights in Weardale from the Bishop of Durham.

In 1853, W B Lead began driving the Park Level Mine, which eventually intersected 11 mineral veins. As the mine developed, so did the surface workings. In 1858, a "mineshop" was built to accommodate the miners; the population density in such a remote area was very low and, until then, miners had been faced with a long daily walk to and from the mine. In 1862, storage bays ("bouse teams") were constructed, to store the raw lead ore (the "bouse"), and washing rakes were installed, in which water was used to separate the lead ore in the bouse from the waste material. In 1878, soon after the mine struck the richest of the veins, the Park Level Mill was brought into operation, to speed up the process of washing the ore. The main feature of the mill was a large waterwheel, the "Killhope Wheel".

Not long after the Park Level Mill came into use, the price of lead plummeted, rendering lead-mining in Weardale uneconomic and, in 1883, W B Lead closed all of its operations in the district. The Park Level Mine was taken over by another company, Weardale Lead, which continued to operate it until 1910, when production ceased. The mine was re-opened briefly in 1916, during the First World War, after which it lay derelict for over 60 years, during which time the buildings crumbled and any equipment that could be removed was salvaged for scrap.

Between 1818 and 1883, records show that W B Lead extracted over 31,200 tonnes of lead concentrates from the Killhope operations; between 1884 and 1916, Weardale Lead extracted a further 9,000 tonnes. Taking in the period before 1818, for which there are no records, it is thought that total output from Killhope may have exceeded 60,000 tonnes. In addition, 180 tonnes of zinc concentrates were recovered in the 1950s by treatment of some of the waste material.

== Reconstruction ==
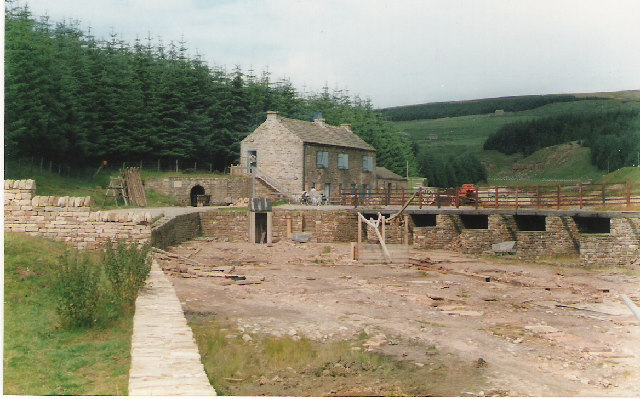
The mine as it appeared in 1988

By 1980, the Killhope Wheel was facing demolition, the washing floor had become a marshy field, and the rest of the site was decaying. In that year, the Durham County Council took over the site and began a programme of restoration. First to be restored was the "mineshop", which was opened to the public in May 1984. The Killhope Wheel was restored to working order in 1991 and the mine itself was opened in 1996.

It had been hoped that the existing mine could be restored to allow access by the public, but though the Park Level was found to be generally in sound condition, and the first 100 metres has been used as an access route, the area in the vicinity of the first vein workings was badly collapsed and unsafe. Reconstruction therefore consisted of constructing a new 'artificial' mine within a chamber that was excavated from the surface. Within this artificial mine, the rock surfaces are actually fibreglass casts, taken not just from Killhope but also from mines in the Nenthead district in nearby Cumbria. Despite their artificial nature, the casts faithfully represent the appearance and texture of the real rock.

== Killhope Wheel ==
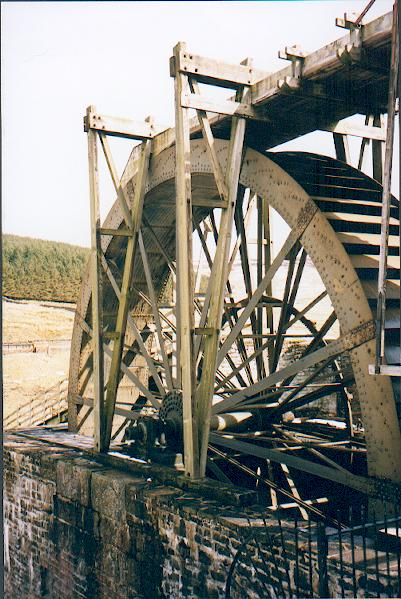
The Killhope Wheel

One of the main features of the reconstructed mine is the Killhope Wheel, a 10-metre-diameter metal waterwheel. This was constructed by the Tyneside firm of William Armstrong. Although other waterwheels were used in and around the mine, this was the largest, and the only one to survive the decades of neglect. It has now been restored to full working order.

== Awards ==
The museum has won several awards: it was the North East's Small Visitor Attraction of the Year in 2008, and was the inaugural winner of the Guardian's Family-Friendly Museum award in 2004.

== Other lead mining remains in the area ==
Other interpretive sites in the area are the Heritage Centre at Allenheads, in Northumberland, and the Nenthead Mines Heritage Centre, a short distance away in Cumbria.

Numerous traces of Weardale's lead mining industry can still be seen and the Durham Dales Centre in Stanhope produces guides to a Lead Mining Trail that covers many of the more accessible sites.

Other disused lead mines in County Durham are:

- Low Slitt Mine, Westgate
- Middlehope Shield, Westgate
- Brandon Walls Mine, Rookhope
- Rookhope Old Smelt Mill
- Feldon Smelt Mill
- Coldberry Mine, Middleton-in-Teesdale
- Middle Greenlaws, Daddry Shield
- Derwent Lead Mines
- Lady Rake Mine, Harwood
- Greenhurth Mine, Harwood
- Pike Law Mines, Newbiggin, Teesdale

== See also ==
- Killhope
