= Cornriggs =

Hamlet in County Durham, England

Coordinates: 54°46′02″N 2°14′29″W

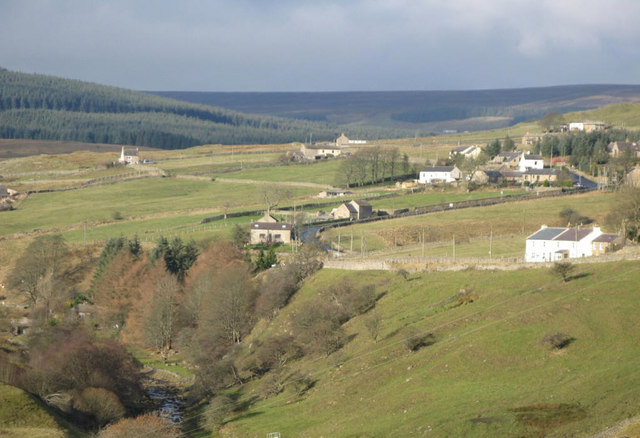

- Location within County Durham
- OS grid reference: NY 84567 41393
- Civil parish: Stanhope
- Unitary authority: County Durham
- Ceremonial county: County Durham
- Region: North East
- Country: England
- Sovereign state: United Kingdom
- Post town: BISHOP AUCKLAND
- Postcode district: DL13
- Dialling code: 01388
- Police: Durham
- Fire: County Durham and Darlington
- Ambulance: North East
- UK Parliament: North West Durham

Cornriggs is a hamlet in the civil parish of Stanhope, in County Durham, England. It is situated on the north side of Weardale in the North Pennines, which is designated as both an Area of Outstanding Natural Beauty and a UNESCO Global Geopark.

The hamlet lies around the A689 road between the villages of Lanehead and Cowshill and is located near Killhope Burn, a tributary of the River Wear. It primarily consists of Low Cornriggs Farm and there is also a small number of other buildings around the area.

Low Cornriggs Farm had fallen out of use by the early 1970s and the farmhouse remained empty and derelict for twenty years until purchased in the early 1990s. The new owner embarked on a series of renovations, including restoring footpaths and walls on the property, breeding animals native to the local area, and converting the farmhouse into a bed and breakfast. She was rewarded for her efforts in restoring the buildings and land in 1994 when she was presented with the North Pennines Green Tourism Award for that year.
