= East Briscoe =

Village in County Durham, England

Coordinates: 54.571°N 2.032°W

- Location within County Durham
- OS grid reference: NY980195
- Unitary authority: County Durham
- Ceremonial county: County Durham
- Region: North East
- Country: England
- Sovereign state: United Kingdom
- Post town: DARLINGTON
- Postcode district: DL12
- Police: Durham
- Fire: County Durham and Darlington
- Ambulance: North East

East Briscoe is a village in Baldersdale, in the Pennines district of County Durham, England. It is traditionally located in the North Riding of Yorkshire but along with the rest of the former Startforth Rural District it was transferred to County Durham for administrative and ceremonial purposes on 1 April 1974, under the provisions of the Local Government Act 1972.
