= Rogerley Quarry =

Disused quarry and Site of Special Scientific Interest in County Durham, England

- Location within County Durham
- Location: MAGiC MaP
- Nearest town: Stanhope
- Coordinates: 54°44′04″N 1°58′22″W
- Area: 5.6 ha (14 acres)
- Established: 1984
- Governing body: Natural England
- Website: Rogerley Quarry SSSI

Rogerley Quarry is a Site of Special Scientific Interest in the Wear Valley district of west County Durham, England. It lies on the edge of the valley of the River Wear, alongside the A689 road, about 1 km upriver from the village of Frosterley.

The site is a disused quarry and has been designated as of national importance in the Geological Conservation Review as a key site for sedimentological studies. The quarry exhibits a long section of basal Namurian sandstones which derive from riverine sedimentation. The quarry face intersects the ancient river channel at right angles, allowing the lateral changes in deposition across the channel to be clearly seen.
