= Brotherlee =

Hamlet in County Durham, England

Coordinates: 54°44′05″N 2°07′05″W

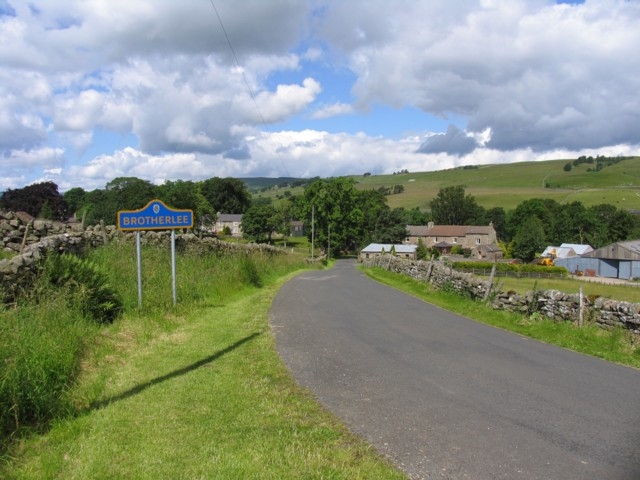
- Entering Brotherlee from the east

- Location within County Durham
- Civil parish: Stanhope
- Unitary authority: County Durham
- Ceremonial county: County Durham
- Region: North East
- Country: England
- Sovereign state: United Kingdom
- Post town: DARLINGTON
- Postcode district: DL13

Brotherlee is a hamlet in the civil parish of Stanhope, in County Durham, England situated on the south side of Weardale, between Stanhope and Daddry Shield.
