= High Dyke =

High Dyke may refer to:

- High Dyke (road), a road in Lincolnshire
- High Dyke, County Durham, a hamlet in County Durham
