= Shittlehope =

Hamlet in County Durham, England

Coordinates: 54°44′30″N 1°59′44″W

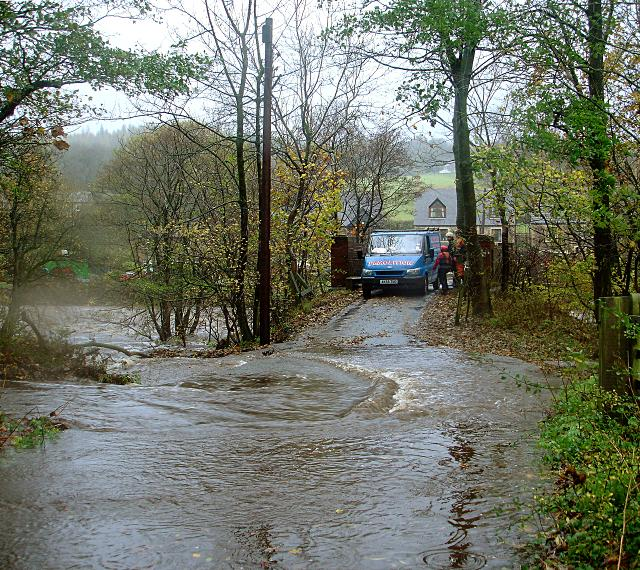
- Flooding at Shittlehope Bridge in 2009

- Location within County Durham
- Civil parish: Stanhope
- Unitary authority: County Durham
- Ceremonial county: County Durham
- Region: North East
- Country: England
- Sovereign state: United Kingdom

Shittlehope is a hamlet in the civil parish of Stanhope, in County Durham, England. It is situated on the north side of Weardale between Stanhope and Frosterley.

== Geography ==
Shittlehope Burn flows nearby. The burn flows by Lynkirk Cave, a popular caving spot in the area.
