= Lintzgarth =

Village in County Durham, England

Coordinates: 54.780°N 2.115°W

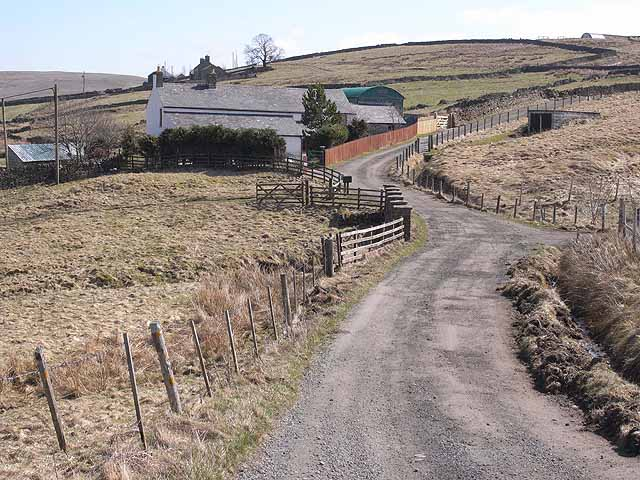

- Location within County Durham
- Civil parish: Stanhope
- Unitary authority: County Durham
- Ceremonial county: County Durham
- Region: North East
- Country: England
- Sovereign state: United Kingdom

Lintzgarth is a village in the civil parish of Stanhope, in County Durham, England. It is situated to the west of Rookhope.

The Lintzgarth smeltmill was built in 1737 and was used for smelting lead by all of the leadmines in the Rookhope valley. The poisonous fumes from the smelt mill were taken along a 1.5 miles (2.4 km) flue and emitted from a chimney on Redburn Common.
