= Snaisgill =

Hamlet in County Durham, England

Coordinates: 54.638°N 2.069°W

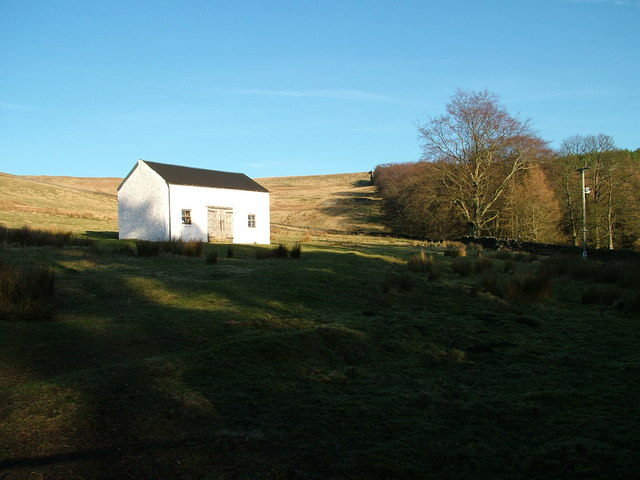

- Location within County Durham
- OS grid reference: NY956269
- Civil parish: Middleton in Teesdale
- Unitary authority: County Durham
- Ceremonial county: Durham
- Region: North East
- Country: England
- Sovereign state: United Kingdom
- Post town: DARLINGTON
- Postcode district: DL12
- Police: Durham
- Fire: County Durham and Darlington
- Ambulance: North East

Snaisgill is a hamlet in the civil parish of Middleton in Teesdale, in County Durham, England. It is situated to the north of Middleton-in-Teesdale. The surrounding area was extensively mined for lead and baryte.
