= Wearhead =

Village in County Durham, England

Coordinates: 54.751°N 2.222°W

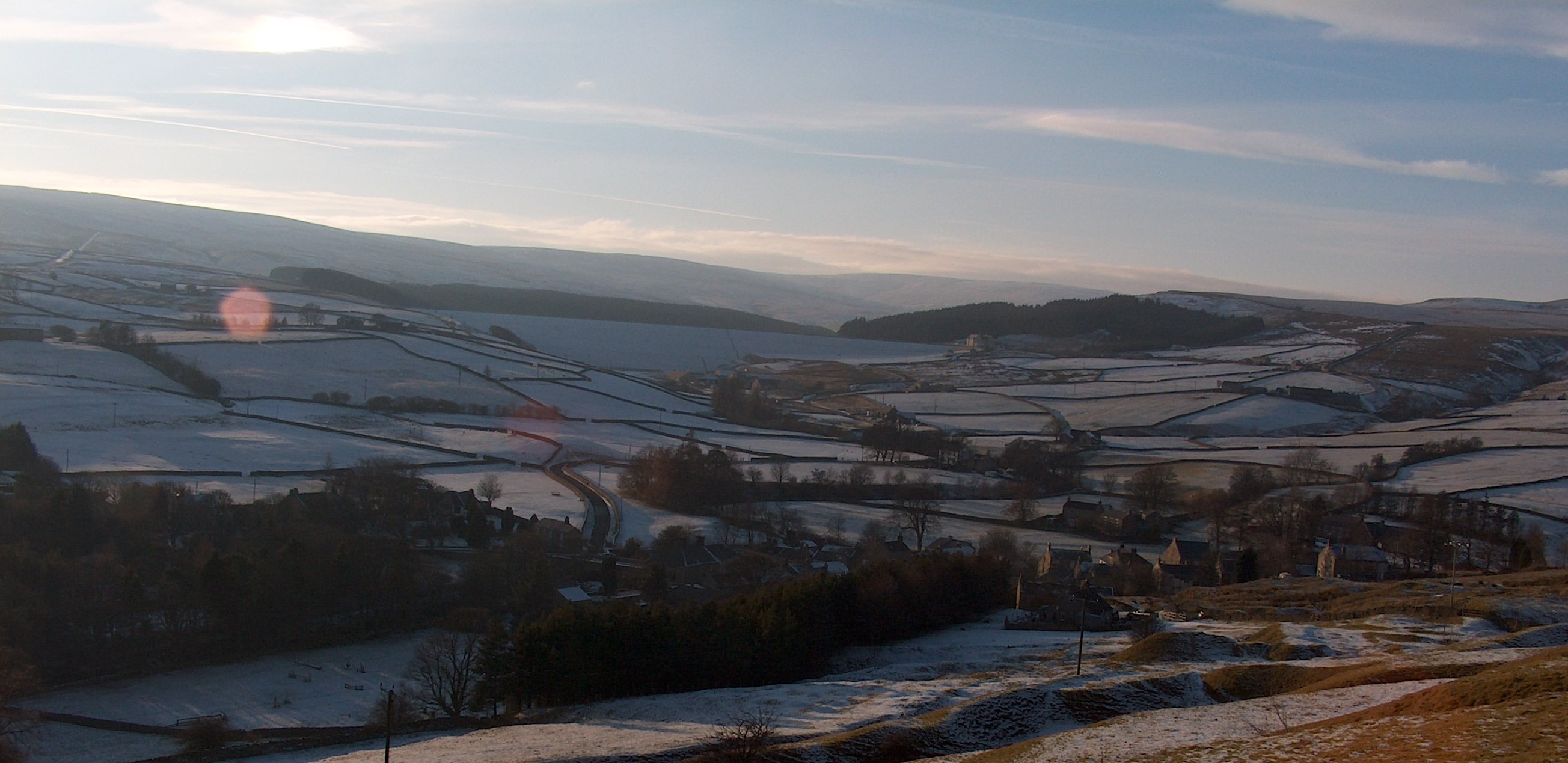
- Looking down to Wearhead (Winter 2009)

- Location within County Durham
- Population: 210 (2001 census)
- OS grid reference: NY858395
- Civil parish: Stanhope
- Unitary authority: County Durham
- Ceremonial county: Durham
- Region: North East
- Country: England
- Sovereign state: United Kingdom
- Post town: Bishop Auckland
- Postcode district: DL13
- Dialling code: 01388
- Police: Durham
- Fire: County Durham and Darlington
- Ambulance: North East
- UK Parliament: Bishop Auckland

Wearhead is a village in the civil parish of Stanhope, in County Durham, England. It is situated at the top of Weardale between Cowshill and Ireshopeburn. It is named after the nearby source of the River Wear which runs eastwards for approx 40 miles (64 km) to Sunderland. In the 2001 census Wearhead had a population of 210.

The first settlement at Wearhead may have been a farmstead, possibly a summer base for the Bishop's cattle which would have been taken to lower ground in winter. East of the village lies a steep hillside, which has evidence of shallow shafts and hushes which were the early methods used to extract lead and iron. In County Durham there were rich deposits of lead lying within a circle of about 10 miles' radius drawn around Wearhead, hence the lead-mining industry of Weardale and Teesdale.

In 1858 the Post Office Directory listed: Beer Retailer, Grocer/Draper, Tailor/Draper, Grocer, Joiner/Postmaster, Grocer and Draper's/Joiner.

In 1915 the Post Office Directory listed only The Bank of Liverpool.

In 1971 Barclays Bank (formerly Martins Bank) was sold and the property became a butcher's shop, which has since closed.

Wearhead stands 1,104 feet (336 m) above sea level and has some of the highest peaks in County Durham, namely Killhope Law at 2,208 feet (673 m) and Burnhope Seat at 2,452 feet (747 m). Burnhope Reservoir is approximately 1 mile (1.6 km) from Wearhead. In the construction six farms were submerged when water rose to fill the man-made reservoir in 1937.

== Railways ==
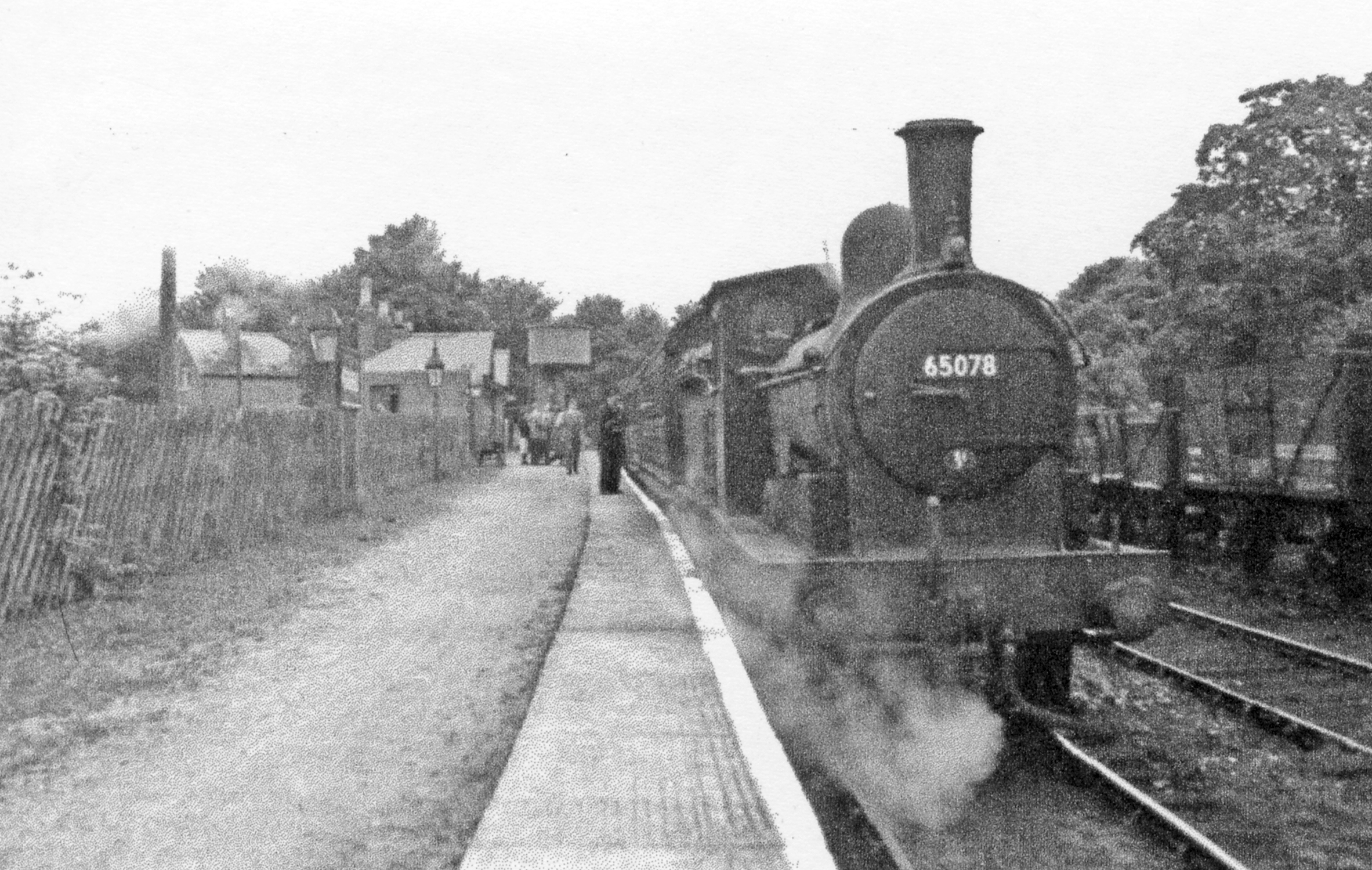
Wearhead station and train for Bishop Auckland on Last Day, 1953

Wearhead was the terminus of the Weardale Extension Railway which opened on 21 October 1895. The line was mainly used for freight carrying limestone, iron ore, lead ore and fluorspar to the industrial areas of North East England. The station was host to a LNER camping coach from 1935 to 1939 and possibly one for some of 1934. It closed to passenger traffic on 29 June 1953 and to goods on 2 January 1961.

== Decline and revival ==
In 2005 the last remaining shop in the village, Co-op, closed. Shortly afterwards the Methodist Church held its last service after being in existence for over 180 years.

The former Co-op shop has re-opened as an independent village store and the former Post Office was opened as a craft shop/cafe. This has closed and been converted to a house since.

There is a park and recreational field where the local teams play football.

== Landmarks ==
- Burnhope Reservoir
- A Mineral Valleys Project walk - Wearhead (The River Starts Here)
- Killhope, the North of England Lead Mining Museum
- The Weardale Museum and High House Chapel at Ireshopeburn
- The confluence of Burnhope Burn and Killhope Burn to form the Wear.
- Just a short walk up the Weardale Way above this confluence, there are two low waterfalls on Killhope Burn.

== See also ==
- List of closed railway stations in Britain
