= Stanhope Town Hall =

Municipal building in Stanhope, County Durham, England

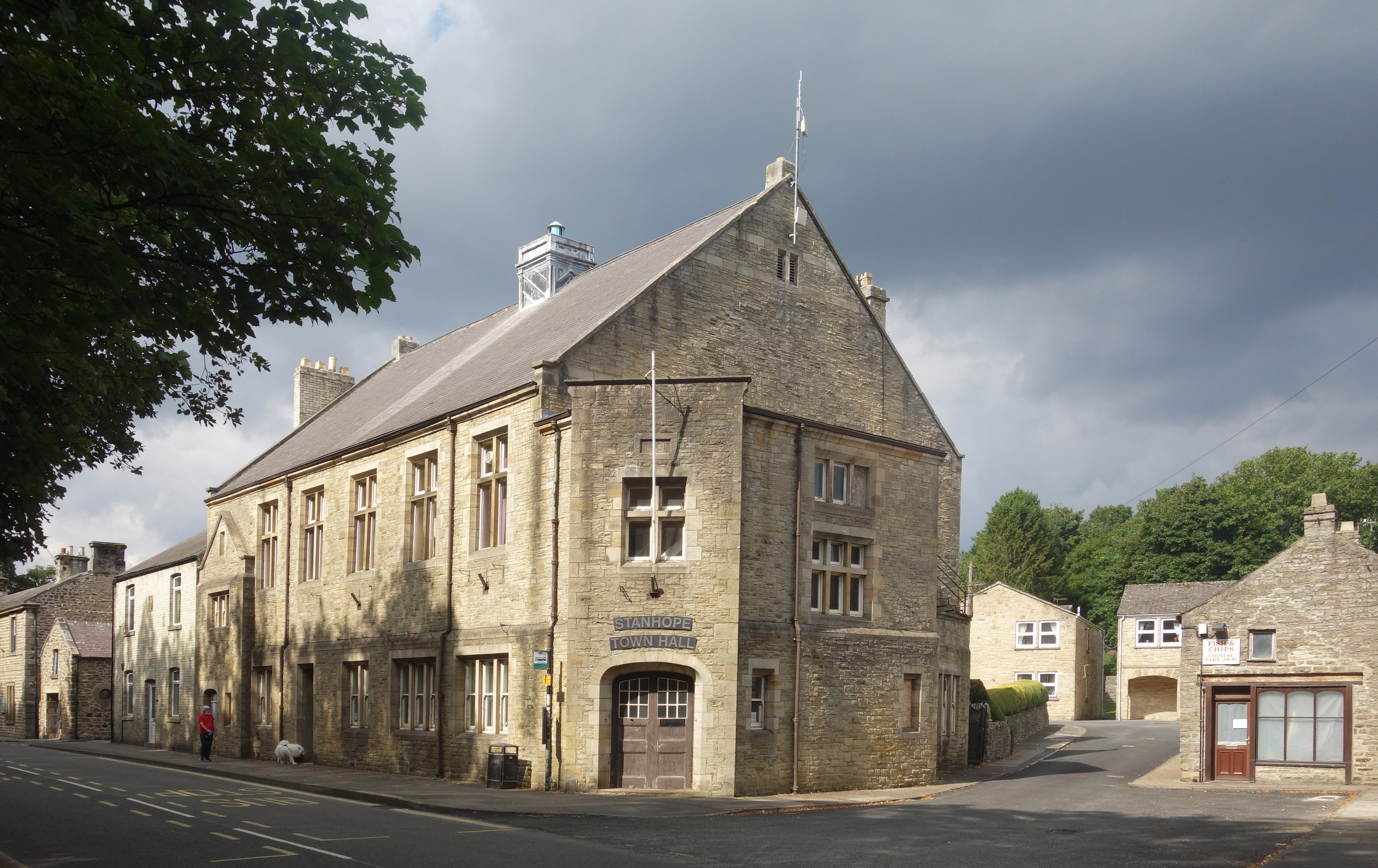
- The 1901 town hall in 2022

- Shown in County Durham
- 54.7489°N 2.0104°W
- Location: Front Street, Stanhope

History
- Built: 1849

Site notes
- Architectural style: Victorian style

Stanhope Town Hall was located in two former municipal buildings on Front Street, Stanhope, a town in County Durham, England. The original town hall was located in the current Community Centre. The subsequent town hall, built to the east of the original town hall in 1901, is not currently in use and is being marketed for sale.

== History ==
1849 Town Hall

In 1846, the parish leaders in Stanhope, led by the Rector, the Reverend William Darnell, decided to commission a town hall for the parish and to finance it by public subscription. The site they selected, on the north side of Front Street in the west end of the town, was held in copyhold by the Diocese of Durham, and the Bishop of Durham, Edward Maltby, donated it to the parish.

The new building was designed in the Victorian style, built in rubble masonry and was completed in 1849. The design involved a main block of five bays facing onto Front Street. It was fenestrated by a mixture of bi-partite and tri-partite mullioned windows on the ground floor and by five cross-windows on the first floor. After the grant of some more land by the Ecclesiastical Commissioners, the building was enlarged, to accommodate a police station and a magistrates' court, in 1862.

A new building to accommodate the local police station was erected further northwest along Front Street in the early 20th century. The Durham Constabulary relocated to the new building at that time, allowing the original building to be dedicated to municipal use. The new building served as a police station for over a century but, after the police service moved to the Durham Dales Centre in Castle Gardens in March 2008, it was converted into a community centre; a local community association acquired it in September 2020.

1901 Town Hall

Following significant population growth, largely associated with the status of Stanhope as a market town, a local board of health was established in the town in February 1874. The board was succeeded by an urban district in 1894. In this context the new council decided to build a new town hall to the east of the original town hall. The new building included a canted entrance bay on the corner of Front Street and Cross Street. This bay contained a segmental headed doorway on the ground floor and a cross-window on the first floor, and was surmounted by a semi-circular pediment containing a date stone inscribed with the year, 1901, in the tympanum.

From 1901 this building also had a sign saying "Stanhope Town Hall" over the doorway, and served as the main municipal centre. Internally, the principal room was the assembly hall on the first floor, which was 43 feet (13 m) long and 41 feet (12 m) wide; it was regularly used for hosting dances and other functions.

During the First World War, the building was made available to the ladies nursing brigade in case of an air raid. It was also used as a recruiting station for the new armies by the Durham Light Infantry. A plaque, to commemorate the lives of local service personnel who had died in the war was unveiled opposite the main entrance of the town hall on 23 December 1921.

The town hall ceased to be the local seat of government when the enlarged Weardale Rural District Council was formed at Fairfield House in Stanhope in 1937. In July 2019, Durham County Council decided it was surplus to requirements, and it was placed on the market in November 2019. It remained unsold by late 2021, at which time the building was described as an "eyesore", although the council stated that it had some plans for investment.
