= West Blackdene =

Village in County Durham, England

Coordinates: 54.746°N 2.207°W

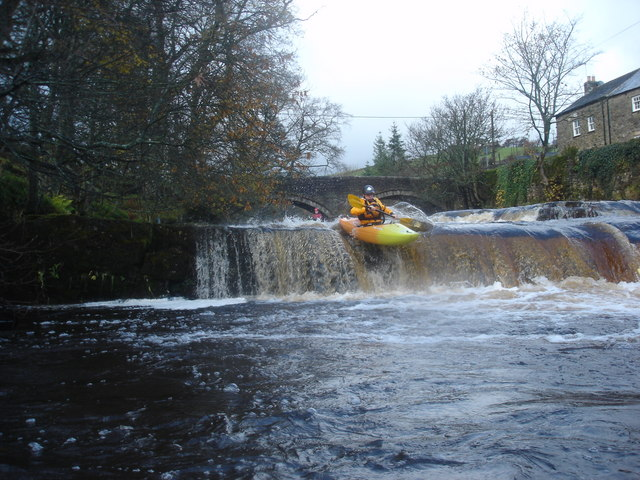

- Location within County Durham
- Population: 37 (2001 census)
- OS grid reference: NY868390
- Civil parish: Stanhope
- Unitary authority: County Durham
- Ceremonial county: County Durham
- Region: North East
- Country: England
- Sovereign state: United Kingdom
- Post town: Darlington
- Postcode district: DL13
- Police: Durham
- Fire: County Durham and Darlington
- Ambulance: North East

West Blackdene is a village in the civil parish of Stanhope, in County Durham, England. It is situated to the north of the River Wear, opposite Ireshopeburn and downstream from Wearhead. In the 2001 census West Blackdene had a population of 37.

== Attractions ==
There is a small waterfall downstream from the bridge over the Wear, Blackdene Force.
