= Aukside =

Coordinates: 54.6360°N 2.0907°W

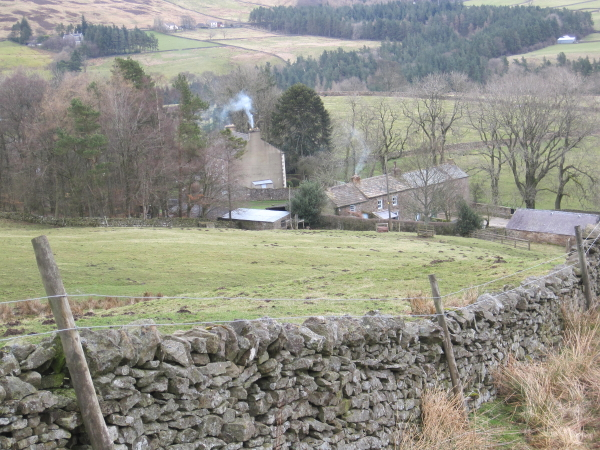
- Aukside Farm

- Location within County Durham
- OS grid reference: NY 94243 26767
- Civil parish: Middleton in Teesdale
- Unitary authority: County Durham
- Ceremonial county: Durham
- Region: North East
- Country: England
- Sovereign state: United Kingdom
- Police: Durham
- Fire: County Durham and Darlington
- Ambulance: North East

Aukside is a hamlet in the civil parish of Middleton in Teesdale, in County Durham, England. It is situated on the north side of Teesdale, a short distance from Middleton-in-Teesdale. It was originally called Hawk Side. This can be seen in early Ordnance Survey maps.
