= Ireshopeburn =

Village in County Durham, England

Coordinates: 54.743°N 2.209°W

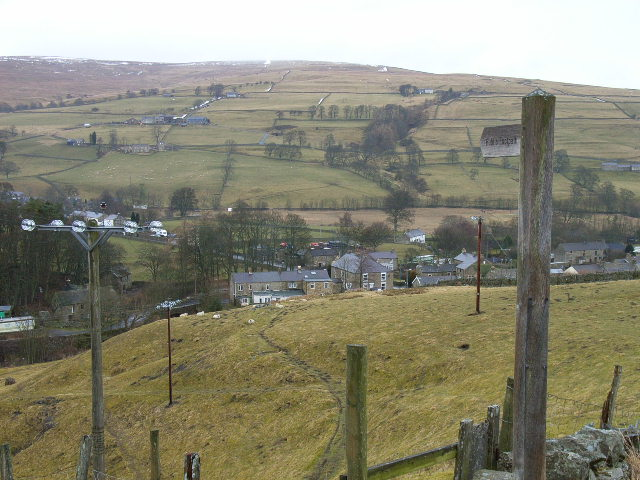
- Ireshopeburn in 2006

- Location within County Durham
- Population: 112 (2001 census)
- OS grid reference: NY866386
- Civil parish: Stanhope
- Unitary authority: County Durham
- Ceremonial county: Durham
- Region: North East
- Country: England
- Sovereign state: United Kingdom
- Post town: Bishop Auckland
- Postcode district: DL13
- Dialling code: 01388
- Police: Durham
- Fire: County Durham and Darlington
- Ambulance: North East
- UK Parliament: Bishop Auckland

Ireshopeburn (/ˈaɪsʊpbɜːrn/; EYE-suup-burn ) is a village in the civil parish of Stanhope, in County Durham, England. It is situated on the south side of Weardale, between St John's Chapel and Wearhead, and on the other side of the Wear from West Blackdene and New House. In the 2001 census Ireshopeburn had a population of 112.

Burnhope Reservoir lies above the village.

Ireshopeburn is the site of the High House Chapel, the oldest purpose-built Methodist Chapel in the world to have held continuous weekly services since its foundation in 1760. John Wesley himself preached at High House on many occasions.

Ireshopeburn is the site of the Weardale Museum.

== Conservation Area ==
Three adjacent but historically distinct settlements of Ireshopeburn, Newhouse and the hamlet of West Blackdene were previously covered by two separate conservation area designations but given their shared landscape context and historical links they are being brought together in a unified conservation area in 2011.

== Attractions ==
A waterfall sits on the River Wear 300m / yards east of the village next to an alpaca farm.

Weardale Museum and High House Chapel is situated in the middle of the village
