= High Dyke, County Durham =

Hamlet in County Durham, England

Coordinates: 54.632°N 2.0793°W

High Dyke
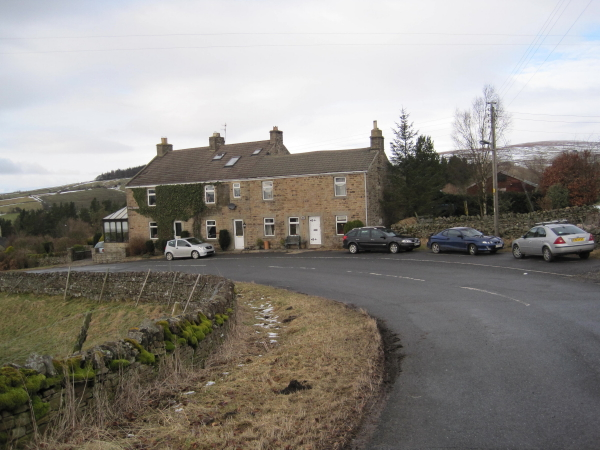

- Location within County Durham
- OS grid reference: NY949262
- Civil parish: Middleton in Teesdale
- Unitary authority: County Durham
- Ceremonial county: Durham
- Region: North East
- Country: England
- Sovereign state: United Kingdom
- Post town: Darlington
- Postcode district: DL12
- Police: Durham
- Fire: County Durham and Darlington
- Ambulance: North East

High Dyke is a hamlet in County Durham, England. It is a short distance to the north of Middleton-in-Teesdale and within the civil parish of the same name. It is named High Dike on an Ordnance Survey map published in 1920 and lies on and around the 1,000 feet (300 m) contour line. Silver-lead ore was mined here in the 19th-century by the London Lead Company; several old shafts are marked on the map.
