= Daddry Shield =

Village in County Durham, England

Coordinates: 54.7359°N 2.1650°W

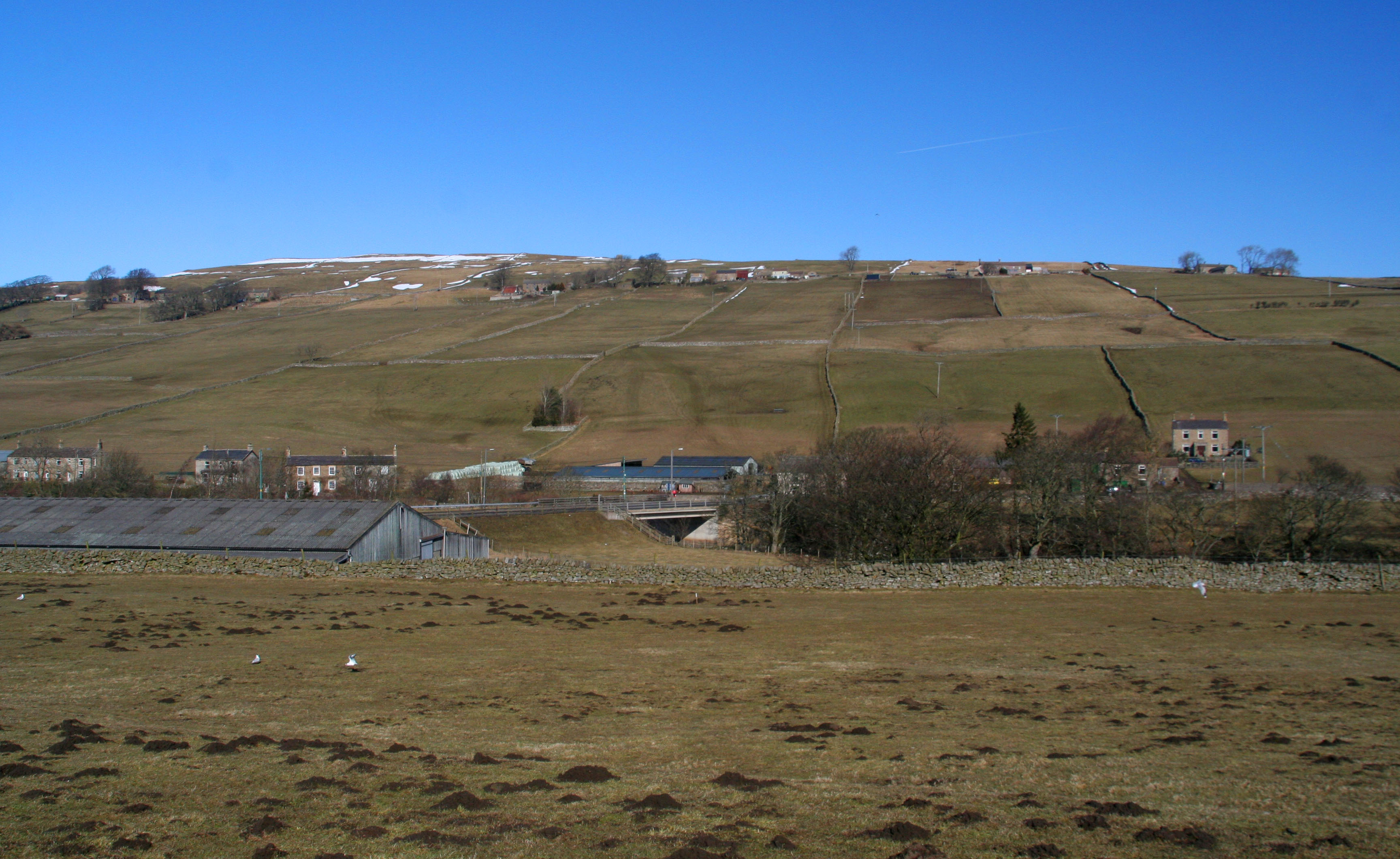
- Daddry Shield and surrounds

- Location within County Durham
- Population: 177 (2001 census)
- OS grid reference: NY895378
- Civil parish: Stanhope
- Unitary authority: County Durham
- Ceremonial county: Durham
- Region: North East
- Country: England
- Sovereign state: United Kingdom
- Post town: Bishop Auckland
- Postcode district: DL13
- Police: Durham
- Fire: County Durham and Darlington
- Ambulance: North East
- UK Parliament: North West Durham

Daddry Shield is a village in the civil parish of Stanhope, in County Durham, England. It is situated on the south side of the River Wear in Weardale, a short distance east from St John's Chapel and west from Westgate. In the 2001 census Daddry Shield had a population of 177.

There are some low waterfalls on the River Wear near Daddry Shield, just upstream from where the A689 cross-country road, passing through Daddry Shield, crosses the river.
