= Hill End, County Durham =

Village in England

Coordinates: 54°43′10″N 1°58′46″W

Hill End
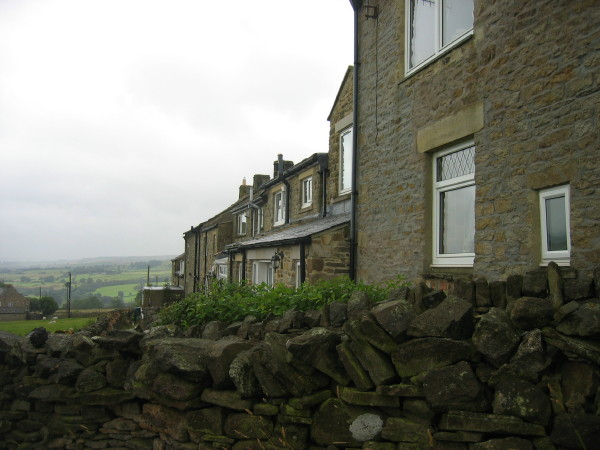

- Location within County Durham
- Civil parish: Stanhope
- Unitary authority: County Durham
- Ceremonial county: Durham
- Region: North East
- Country: England
- Sovereign state: United Kingdom

Hill End is a village in the civil parish of Stanhope, in County Durham, England. It is situated on the south side of Weardale, near Frosterley.
