= Cowshill =

Village in County Durham, England

Coordinates: 54.759°N 2.227°W

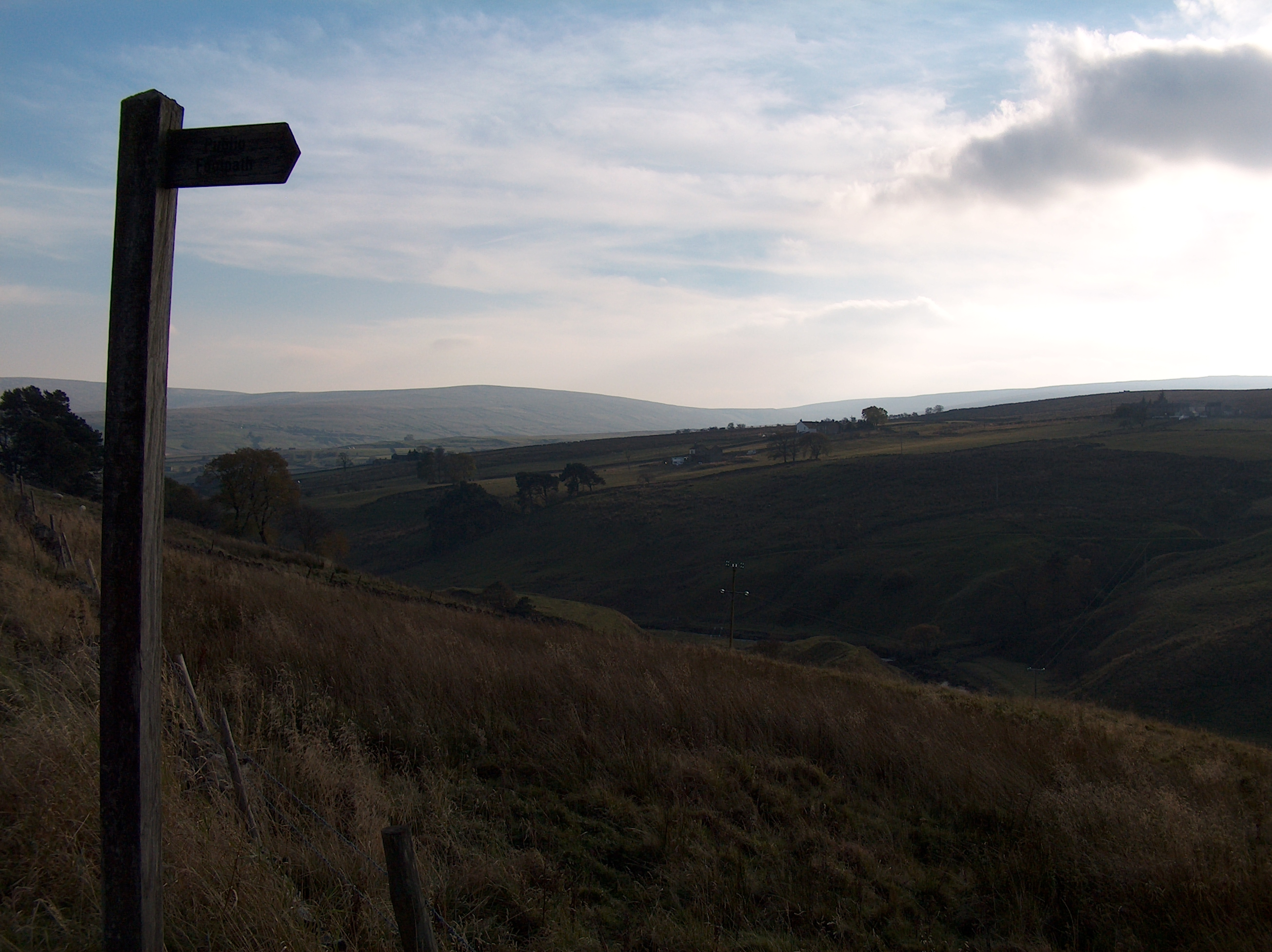
- Weardale, Cowshill

- Location within County Durham
- Population: 156 (2001 census)
- OS grid reference: NY855405
- Civil parish: Stanhope
- Unitary authority: County Durham
- Ceremonial county: Durham
- Region: North East
- Country: England
- Sovereign state: United Kingdom
- Post town: BISHOP AUCKLAND
- Postcode district: DL13
- Dialling code: 01388
- Police: Durham
- Fire: County Durham and Darlington
- Ambulance: North East
- UK Parliament: North West Durham

Cowshill is a village in the civil parish of Stanhope, in County Durham, England. It is situated at the top of Weardale, between Lanehead and Wearhead. In the 2001 census Cowshill had a population of 156.

The Church of St Thomas (1912) is located in Cowshill, and is the parish church for Heatherycleugh parish. Bridge End Cottage is notable for being a 17th-century Bastle house, and is a Grade II listed building. The Cowshill War Memorial commemorates the seven men from the area lost in the First World War and three who died in the Second World War.

Burtree Ford was once considered a separate village, now considered as part of Cowshill, but its name is still apparent in Burtree Farm, and Burtreeford Bridge, over Killhope Burn, and the former Burtreeford Mill.

== Attractions ==
There are two waterfalls on the outskirts of Cowshill.

The larger Cowshill Force is just east of and below the main Cowshill Bridge south of the village centre on Killhope Burn, one of two tributaries of the Wear alongside Burnhope Burn that form the upland Wear a mile (1.6 km) east of Cowshill at Wearhead. The best view of Cowshill Force is from the south side of Killhope Burn once across the bridge, walking about 200 m / yards east along the Weardale Way.

The smaller Sedling Linn waterfall (Linn is an old Northumbrian phrase for waterfall) is on Sedling Burn as it passes under the A689 bridge to join Kilhope Burn. From the bridge, look up to the north.

Kilhope Lead Mining Centre is three miles (4.8 km) to the west along the A689. Anyone visiting should check to see if it is open before journeying to visit.
