= Stanhope, County Durham =

Town in County Durham, England

Coordinates: 54.7471°N 2.006°W

Stanhope
- Town
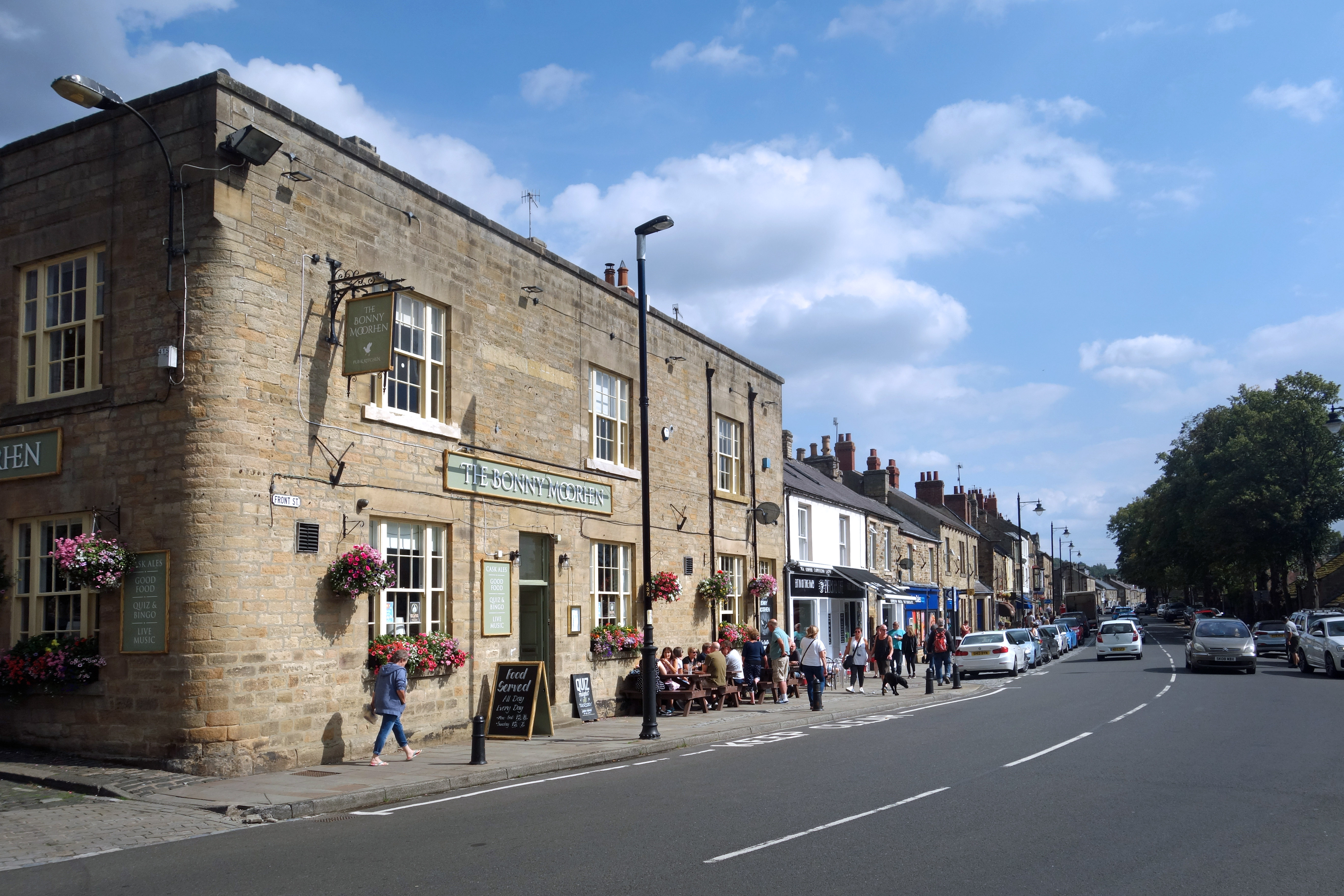
- Front Street

- Location within County Durham
- Population: 1,572 (2021 census)
- OS grid reference: NY995395
- Civil parish: Stanhope
- Unitary authority: County Durham
- Ceremonial county: County Durham
- Region: North East
- Country: England
- Sovereign state: United Kingdom
- Post town: Bishop Auckland
- Postcode district: DL13
- Dialling code: 01388
- Police: Durham
- Fire: County Durham and Darlington
- Ambulance: North East
- UK Parliament: Bishop Auckland

Stanhope /ˈstænəp/ is a market town and civil parish in the County Durham district, in the ceremonial county of Durham, England. It lies on the River Wear between Eastgate and Frosterley, in the north-east of Weardale. The main A689 road over the Pennines is crossed by the B6278 between Barnard Castle and Shotley Bridge near Consett. At the 2021 census, Stanhope had a population of 1,572, which in 2019, was previously estimated at 1,627. The parish population was 4,436 in 2021.

== Governance ==
Stanhope
- Civil parish
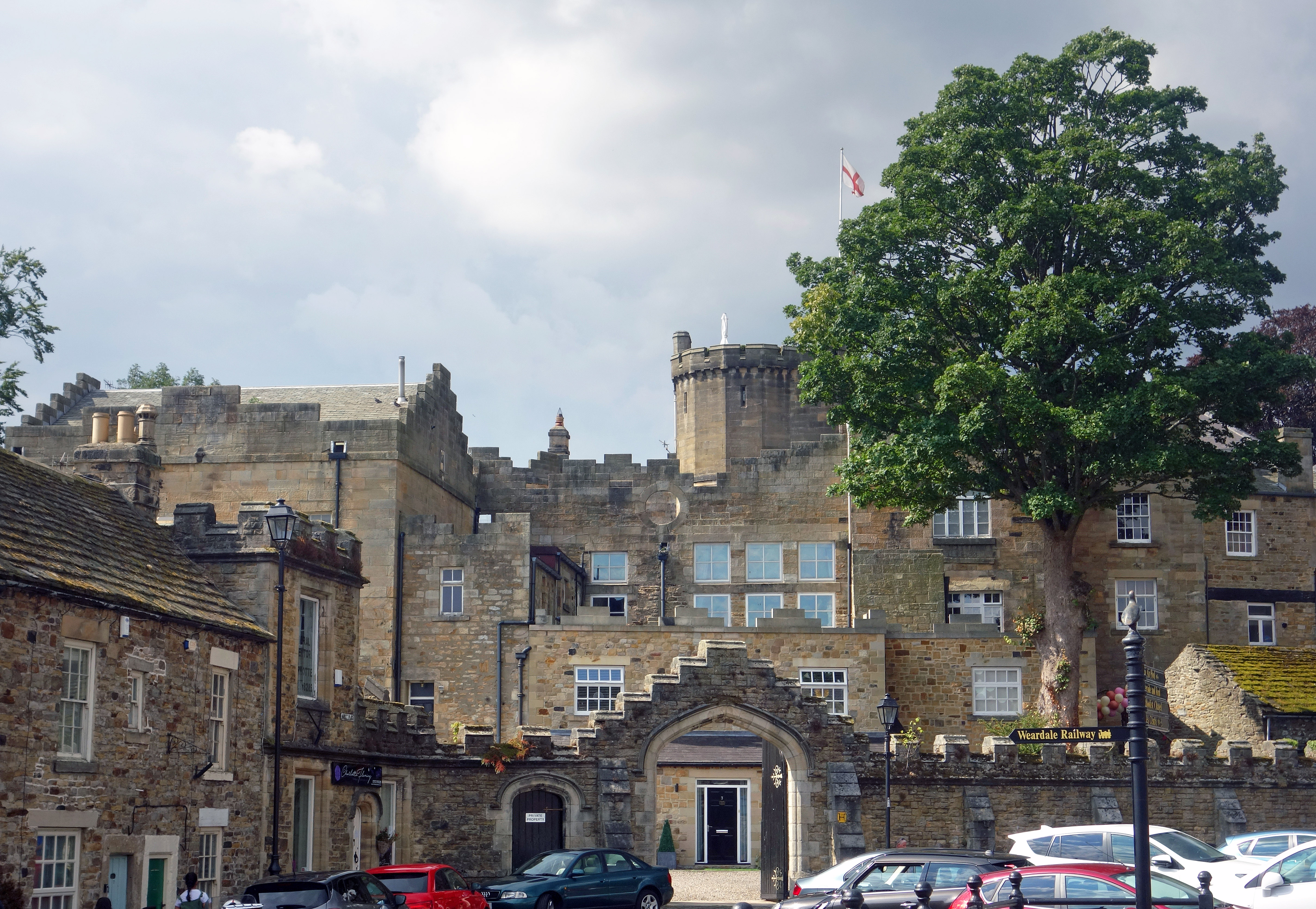
- Stanhope Castle
- Interactive map of Stanhope
- Country: England
- Primary council: County Durham
- County: Durham
- Status: Civil parish
- Settlements: Stanhope, Bollihope, Bridge End, Brotherlee, Copthill, Cornriggs, Cowshill, Crawleyside, Daddry Shield, East Blackdene, Eastgate, Frosterley, Hill End, Ireshopeburn, Killhope, Lanehead, Lintzgarth, New House, Rookhope, Shittlehope, St John's Chapel, Unthank, Wearhead, West Blackdene, Westgate and White Kirkley

Area
  - Total: 85 sq mi (221 km^{2})

Population (2021)
  - Total: 4,436
  - Density: 52.0/sq mi (20.1/km^{2})
- Postcode: DL13
- Website: stanhope-pc.gov.uk

Stanhope parish is the largest parish area in England, at 85 square miles (221 km^{2}). It has some land in common with the neighbouring Wolsingham civil parish. If Stanhope were a district it would be the 135th largest in England or 94th if only counting districts that are two-tier, thus excluding unitary authorities and similar; two ceremonial counties, namely the City of London and Bristol, cover a smaller area. On 31 December 1894 "Stanhope Urban" parish was formed from part of Stanhope parish, but on 1 April 1937 it was merged back. In 1894 Stanhope became an urban district which contained Stanhope Urban parish, on 1 April 1937 the urban district was abolished and merged with Weardale Rural District. On 1 April 1946, 2,396 acres (969.6 ha) were transferred to the parish from Wolsingham. Stanhope Town Hall was completed in 1849.

== Description ==
Stanhope is surrounded by moorland in the North Pennines Area of Outstanding Natural Beauty (AONB) – the second largest of a current 40 such areas in England and Wales. Features of interest include:

- A petrified tree stump standing in the churchyard was found with two others, one of which features in the Great North Museum in Newcastle upon Tyne.
- The Durham Dales Centre incorporates a tea room, tourist information and craft shops.
- Stanhope Bridge, a scheduled monument, was built in the 15th century and widened in 1792.
- The ford has a stepping-stone bridge for pedestrians.
- The 18th-century Stanhope Castle in the town centre stands on the possible site of a medieval castle. It was built in 1798 by Cuthbert Rippon, MP for Gateshead.
- The town has one of only two heated open-air swimming pools in the North East.

The name Stanhope derives from the Old English stānhop meaning 'stone valley'.

Stanhope was at the centre of the Weardale campaign (1327), when Sir James Douglas of Scotland invaded England and faced Edward III and Roger Mortimer, Earl of March. A series of skirmishes took place on the valley floor and in Stanhope Park.

The parish church dedicated to St Thomas is mostly from the 12th–13th centuries, with restoration in 1663 and 1867. The earliest known Rector was Richardus in 1200. Joseph Butler, later Bishop of Bristol, was Rector in 1725.

Stanhope Castle may be on the site of a motte and bailey castle according to some evidence from the 1790s. Furthermore, Bishop Anthony Bek granted land "to the west side of Stanhope castle". The present castle was built for Cuthbert Rippon (1744–1801) in 1798 with additions in 1823 by his son, also Cuthbert (1797–1867) and Member of Parliament for Gateshead. Ignatius Bonomi (1787–1870) was the architect. In 1941 the castle was adapted by the Home Office as a school for boys and remained so until 1980, when it was converted into apartments. Part of the gardens lie to the north of the castle across the main road, including the park wall and gazebo.

The population at the time of the 1841 census was 1,827 inhabitants.

Stanhope Agricultural Show is held on the second weekend of September each year. It has been held annually since 1834, except in world-war years, the 2001 United Kingdom foot-and-mouth outbreak and times of bad weather.

== Transport ==
=== Weardale Railway ===
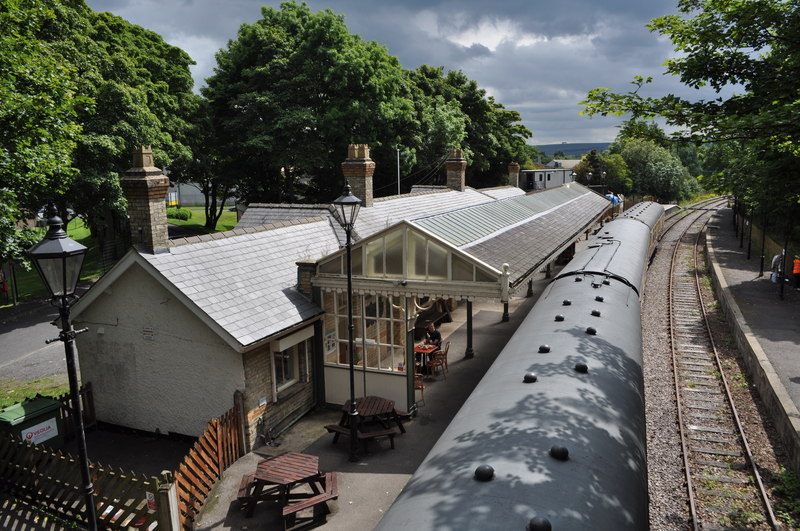
The preserved railway station and tearoom

Stanhope is the current terminus of the Weardale Railway, a heritage line operating mainly at weekends from Bishop Auckland, with stations at Frosterley, Wolsingham and Witton-le-Wear. Stanhope station stood in for the fictional Partlington Station in an episode of the criminal drama series Vera.

=== Buses ===
A daily X46 bus to Durham is run from the village by Arriva North East via Crook and Tow Law. A faster 51 bus towards Durham is ran by Weardale Motor Services also via Tow Law but omitting Crook. Weardale Motor Services run the majority of bus services in the area, including the 101 to Bishop Auckland and Crook, 101A to Cowshill and, three times a day, 102 to Rookhope.

== Notable residents ==
In order of birth:

- Joseph Butler (1692–1752), theologian and cleric
- William Greenwell (1820–1918), archaeologist and Anglican cleric, catalogued Late Bronze Age finds at Heathery Burn Cave near Stanhope in 1859–1872.
- William Percival Crozier (1879–1944), scholar and journalist, edited the Manchester Guardian in 1932–1944.
- Muriel Young (1923–2001), television continuity announcer, presenter and producer, died in Stanhope.

== Gallery ==
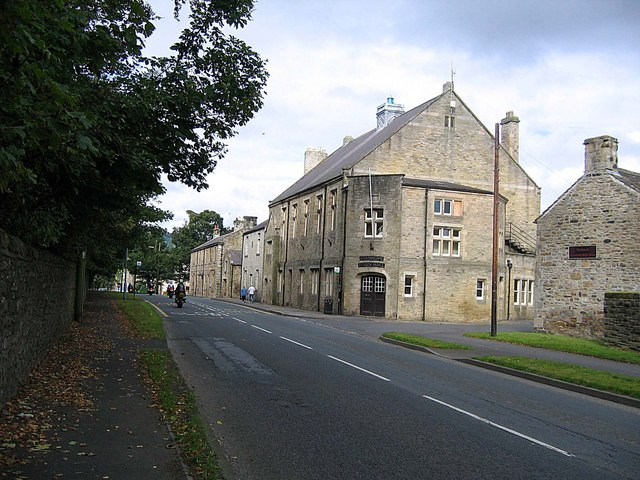
Stanhope Town Hall

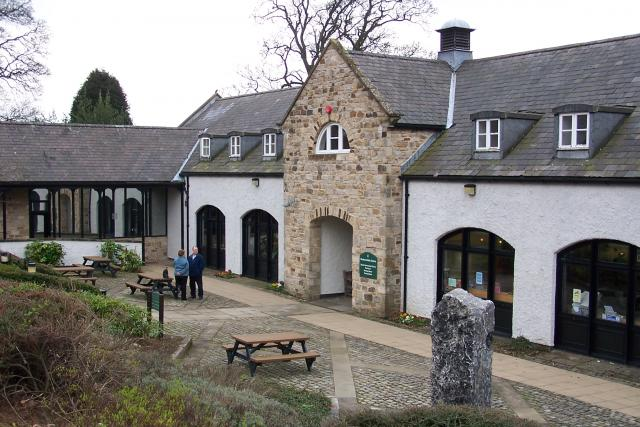
Durham Dales Centre of Arts and Crafts

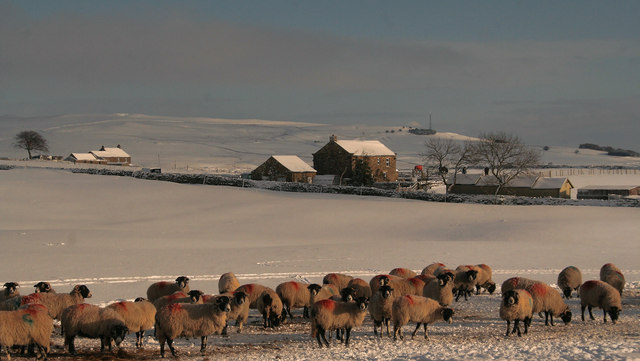
Scurfield House

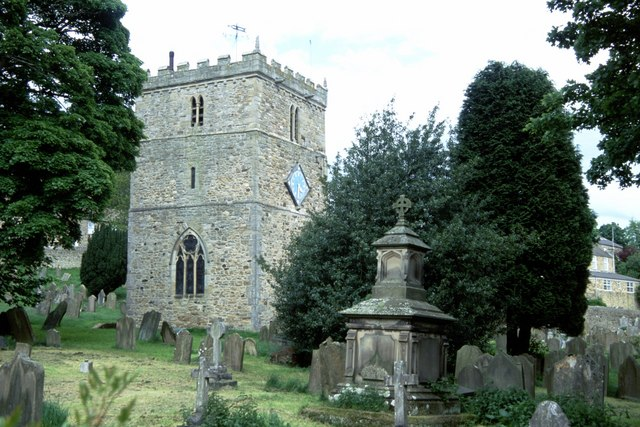
St Thomas's Church

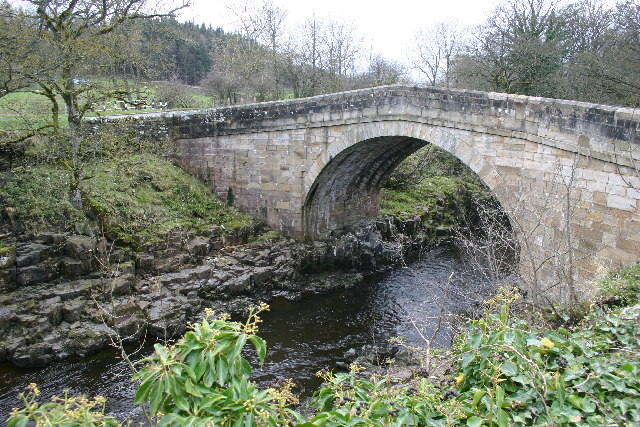
Stone Bridge, a single-arch bridge carrying the B6278 over the River Wear.

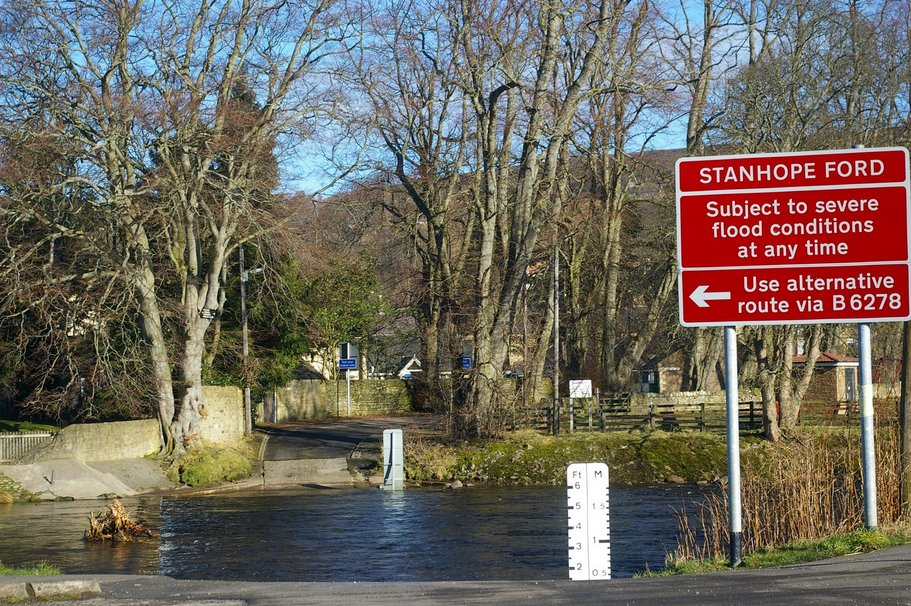
A ford

== See also ==
- Battle of Stanhope Park
