= Rookhope =

Village in County Durham, England

Coordinates: 54°46′N 2°05′W

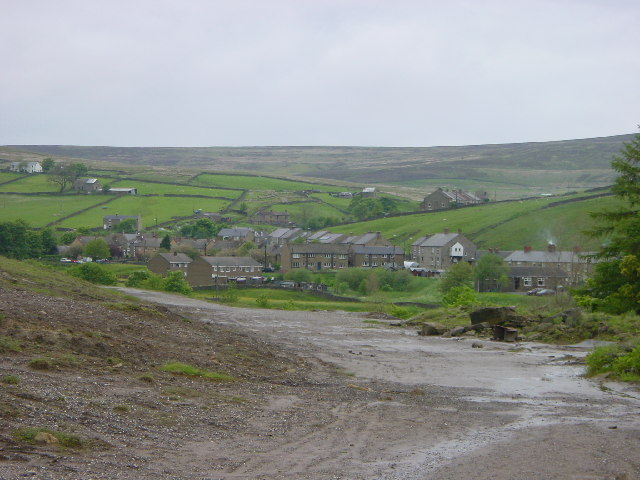

- Location within County Durham
- Population: 267 (2001 census)
- Civil parish: Stanhope
- Unitary authority: County Durham
- Ceremonial county: County Durham
- Region: North East
- Country: England
- Sovereign state: United Kingdom

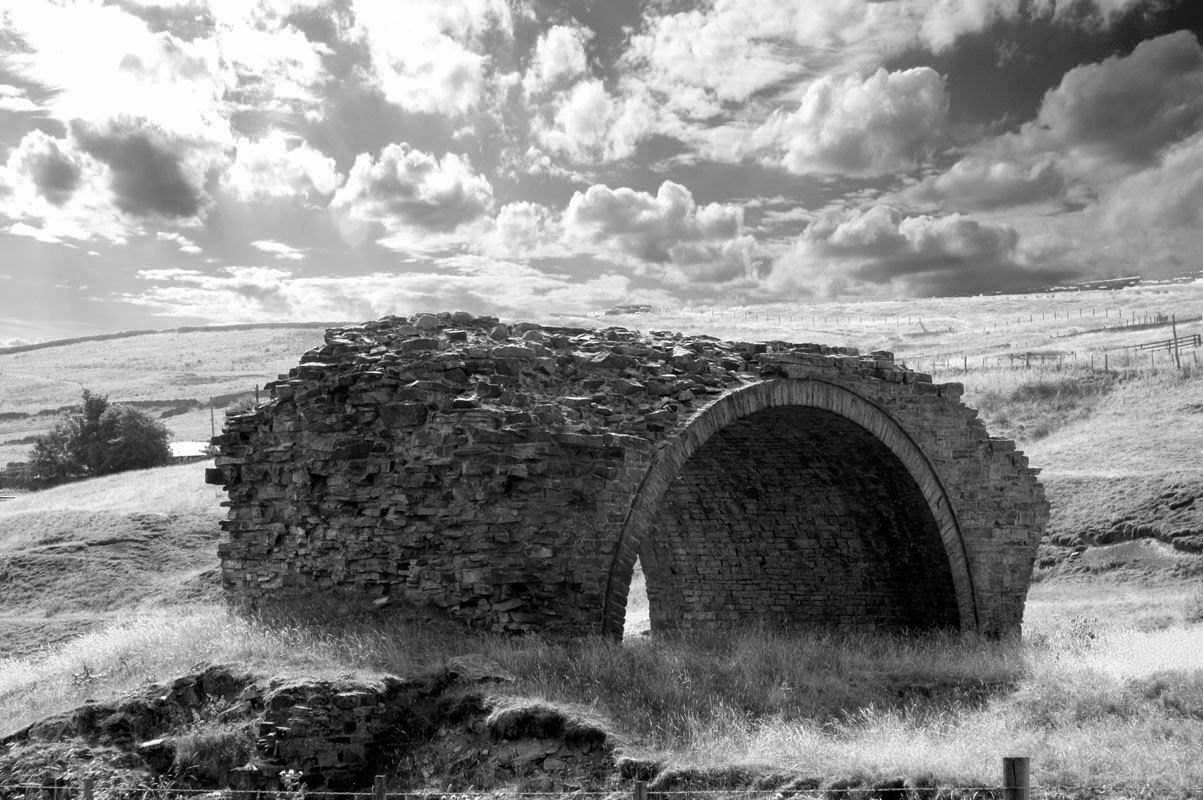
The Rookhope Arch

Rookhope is a village in the civil parish of Stanhope, in County Durham, England. A former lead and fluorspar mining community, it first existed as a group of cattle farms in the 13th century. It is in the Pennines to the north of Weardale. W. H. Auden once called Rookhope "the most wonderfully desolate of all the dales".

In the 2001 census Rookhope had a population of 267.

The village had two public houses, the Swallow's Rest (closed May 2022) and the Rookhope Inn. The village is popular with cyclists on the coast to coast cycling route from Sunderland on the east coast to Whitehaven or Workington on the West Cumbrian coast of northern England.

The village primary school closed in 2024 because of falling pupil numbers.

By road, Rookhope is 25.4 miles (40.9 km) west of Durham, 37.4 miles (60.2 km) west of Newcastle upon Tyne, 48.5 miles (78.1 km) north west of Middlesbrough and 47.2 miles (76.0 km) east of Carlisle.

== Mining ==
Rookhope was once the centre of lead and fluorspar mining in the Dale. The last mine closed in 1999. The shaft head at Grove Rake was recently saved from demolition.

== Rookhope Arch ==
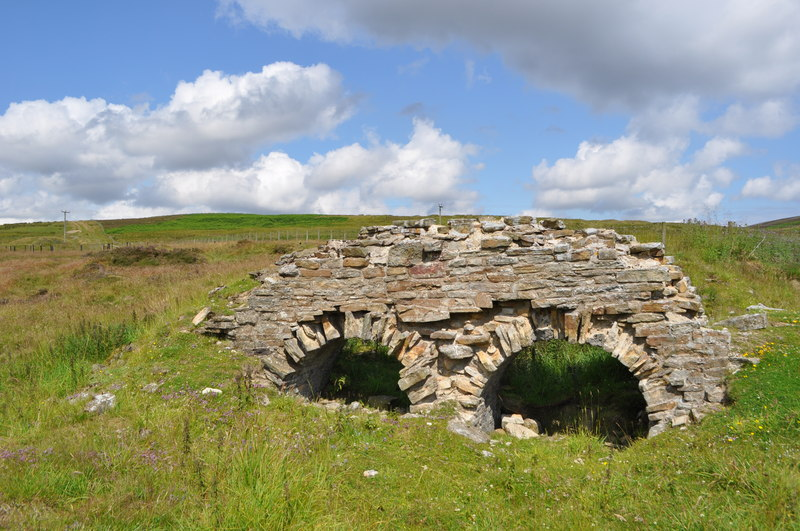
The chimney flue in 2011

A local landmark is the Rookhope Arch at Lintzgarth, a few hundred yards west up the valley; one of the few remaining parts of the two-mile (3.2 km) Rookhope Chimney. This "horizontal" chimney (parallel to the ground, which actually rises steeply to the moors) was used to carry poisonous flue gases from the Rookhope lead smelting works up onto the high moor. Periodically, lead and silver carried over in the gases and deposited in the chimney were dug out and recovered, rather than going to waste.

== St John the Evangelist church ==
The original St John's in Rookhope was built in 1822, but at the end of the 19th century it was pulled down and rebuilt in its current position in 1905. The church closed in 2014. It is a Grade II listed building.

== Governance ==
Rookhope is in the parliamentary constituency of Bishop Auckland, for which Sam Rushworth is the Labour member of Parliament.

For Local Government purposes it is in the Weardale ward of Durham County Council. For parish council purposes it is part of Stanhope Parish Council.

== Literary references ==
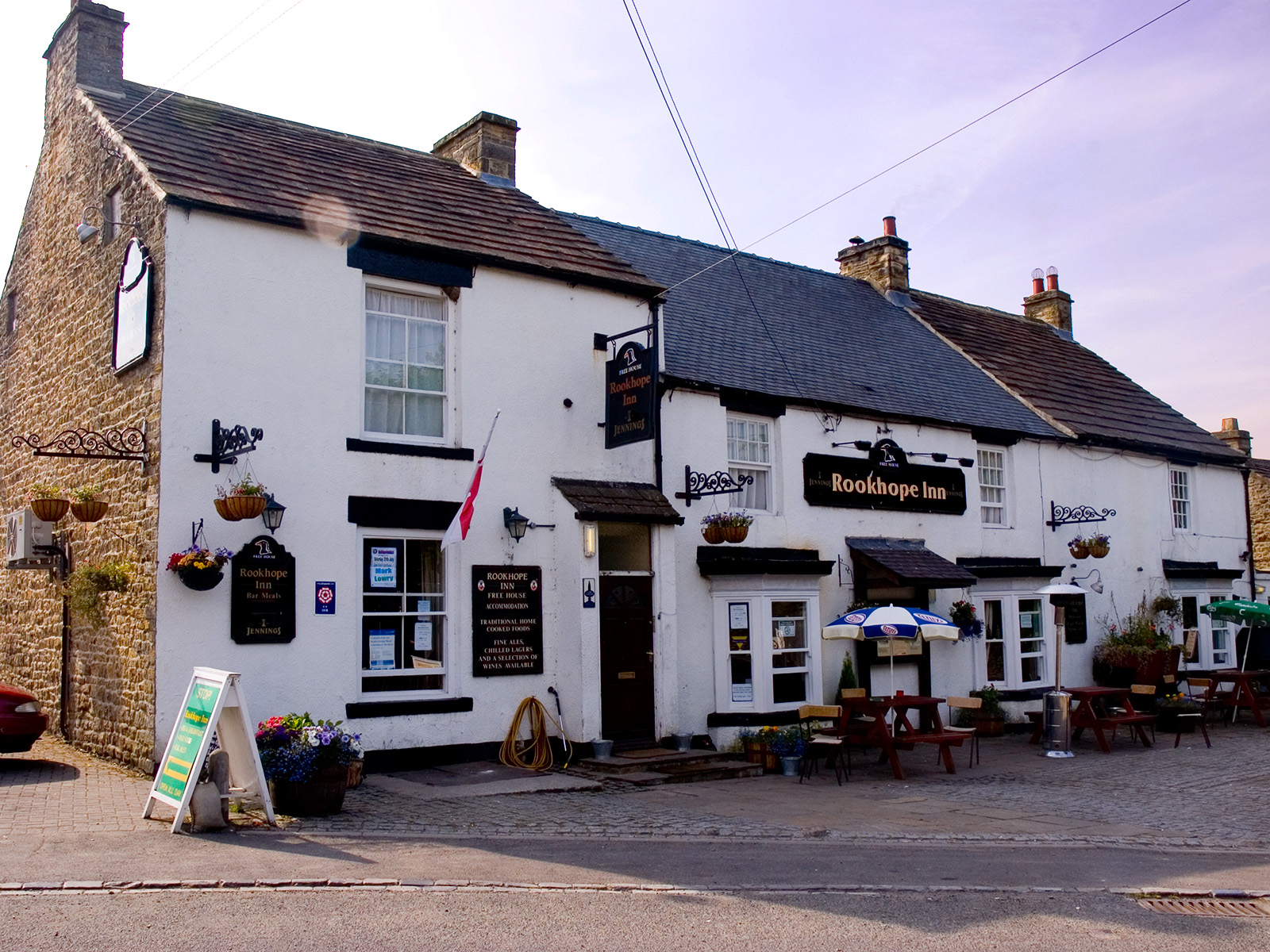
The Rookhope Inn

=== The Rookhope Ride ===
The Rookhope Ride is a border ballad collected by Joseph Ritson from the chanting of George Collingwood of Boltsburn near Rookhope about 1785. The date of the action (a raid) is precise: 6 December 1569, when robbers from Tynedale made a foray into Weardale.

=== W. H. Auden ===
The poet W. H. Auden was familiar with this whole area of the North Pennines and its derelict lead mines, having visited Rookhope at the age of 12 in 1919. In his poem New Year Letter (1941) he wrote that it was in Rookhope that he first became aware of himself as an individual:

In ROOKHOPE I was first aware
Of self and not-self, Death and Dread..."

In this poem he refers to dropping a pebble down a mine-shaft on top of neighbouring Bolt's Law.
