= Frosterley =

Village in County Durham, England

Coordinates: 54.7278°N 1.9588°W

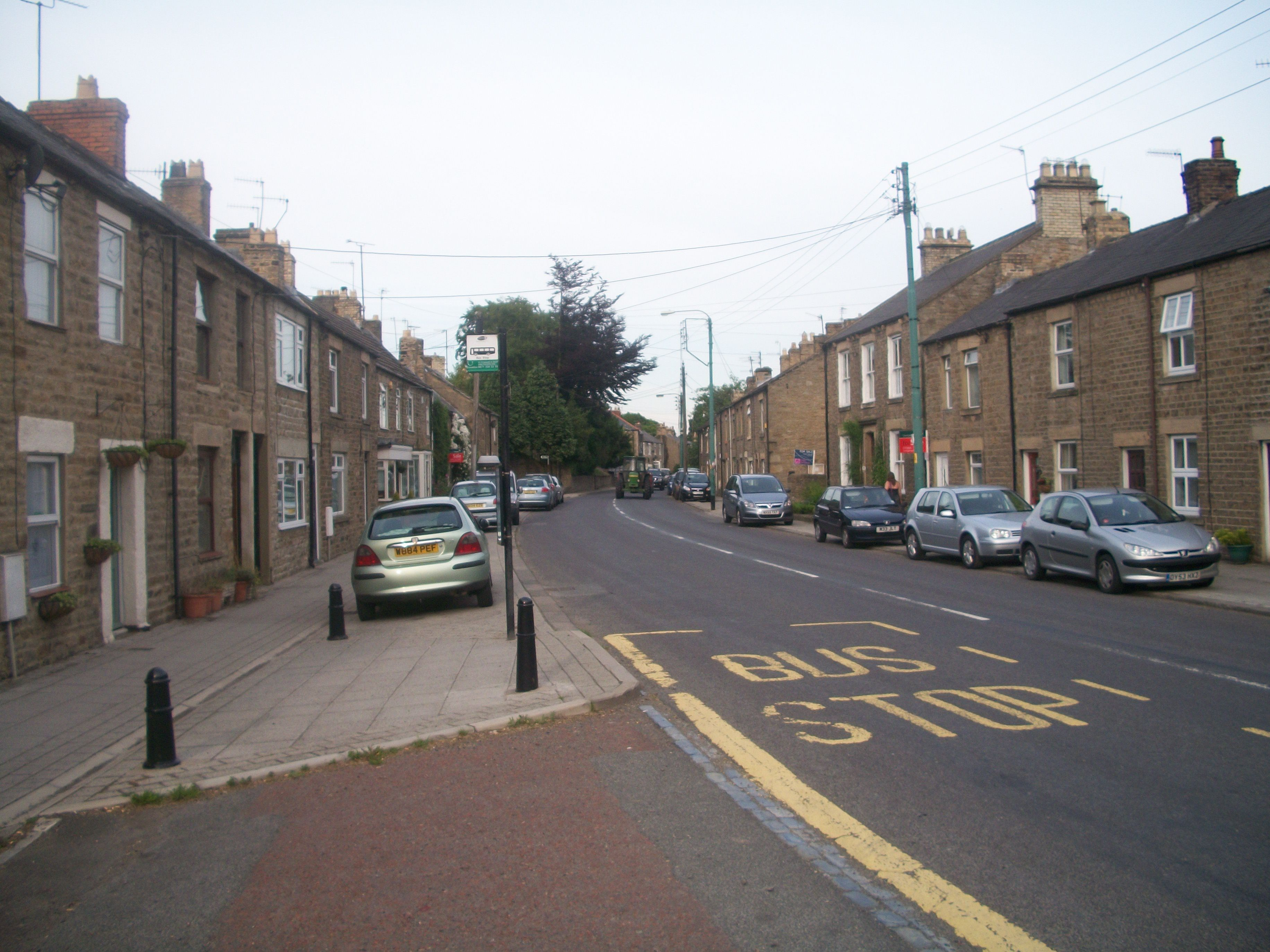
- Frosterley village centre

- Location within County Durham
- Population: 705 (2001 census)
- OS grid reference: NZ025375
- Civil parish: Stanhope
- Unitary authority: County Durham
- Ceremonial county: Durham
- Region: North East
- Country: England
- Sovereign state: United Kingdom
- Post town: BISHOP AUCKLAND
- Postcode district: DL13
- Dialling code: 01388
- Police: Durham
- Fire: County Durham and Darlington
- Ambulance: North East
- UK Parliament: Bishop Auckland

Frosterley is a village in the civil parish of Stanhope, in County Durham, England. It is situated in Weardale, on the River Wear close to its confluence with Bollihope Burn; between Wolsingham and Stanhope; 18 miles (29 km) west of Durham City and 26 miles (42 km) southwest of Newcastle upon Tyne. In the 2001 census Frosterley had a population of 705.

Frosterley is on the Weardale Railway. Heritage trains currently run to Stanhope, Wolsingham and Witton-le-Wear.

== History ==
The area has been inhabited since Mesolithic times: Mesolithic flints and Neolithic stones axes have been found in the vicinity. A bronze spearhead was found in a local quarry dating to the late Bronze Age c. 1000 BC. The village itself has medieval origins, and although the original houses have long been replaced, the village still retains its medieval pattern.

On the north of the village are the remains of St Botolph’s Chapel. What remains is an earthwork mound surrounded by a modern housing estate (Kirk Rise). The site was excavated in 1995, before the estate was built, and the probable remains of an ecclesiastical building were discovered. It is thought this was built around the 10th or 11th century and dedicated to the east Anglian saint St Botolph, who lived in the 7th century and was very popular in medieval times, though little is now known about him. It is thought the village originally may have been named after the saint. The first specific mention of a chapel at Frosterley is in a document of 1346. As late as 1522, the chapel was still in use, but by the late 18th century it was described as 'disused' and 'gone to decay'.

The place name Frosterley is first mentioned in the Bolden Book in 1183. Another reference to the place-name 'Frosterley' occurs in the Close Rolls of 1239, where it appears as Forsterlegh, meaning 'the forester's clearing'.

The parish church of St Michael and All Angels was built in 1869 by G. R. Street. The parish hall was originally a chapel of ease built in 1833. There were also a Primitive Methodist chapel (at Bridge End) and a Wesleyan Methodist chapel.

== Frosterley Marble ==
Frosterley Marble is a black limestone containing fossil crinoids of the Carboniferous Period, some 325 million years ago. When cut and polished the result is an ornate stone, much desired for church decoration, particularly during the Middle Ages.

Frosterley Marble has been taken from the Rogerley Quarry for more than 700 years; the decorative columns found in Durham Cathedral date from about 1350. Examples of Frosterley Marble can be found at several places in the village, the church of St Michael and All Saints, the railway station and behind the car park in the centre of the village.

== Rogerley Mine ==
The Rogerley mine, located in a 19th-century limestone quarry, was the only mine known to be operated on a commercial basis solely for mineral specimens in the UK. It closed at the end of the 2016 summer season.

== Gallery ==
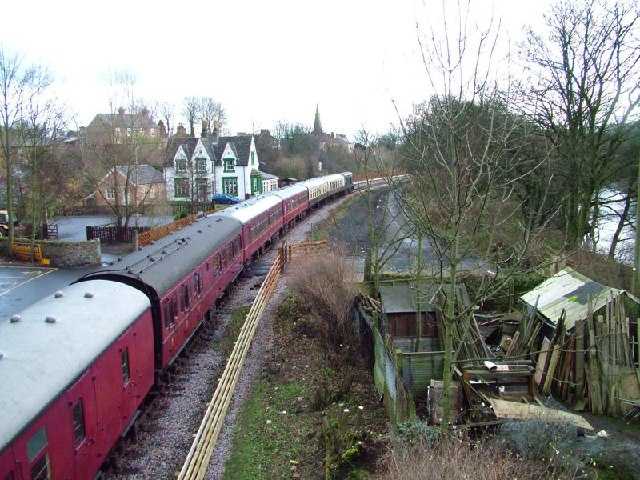
Weardale Railway

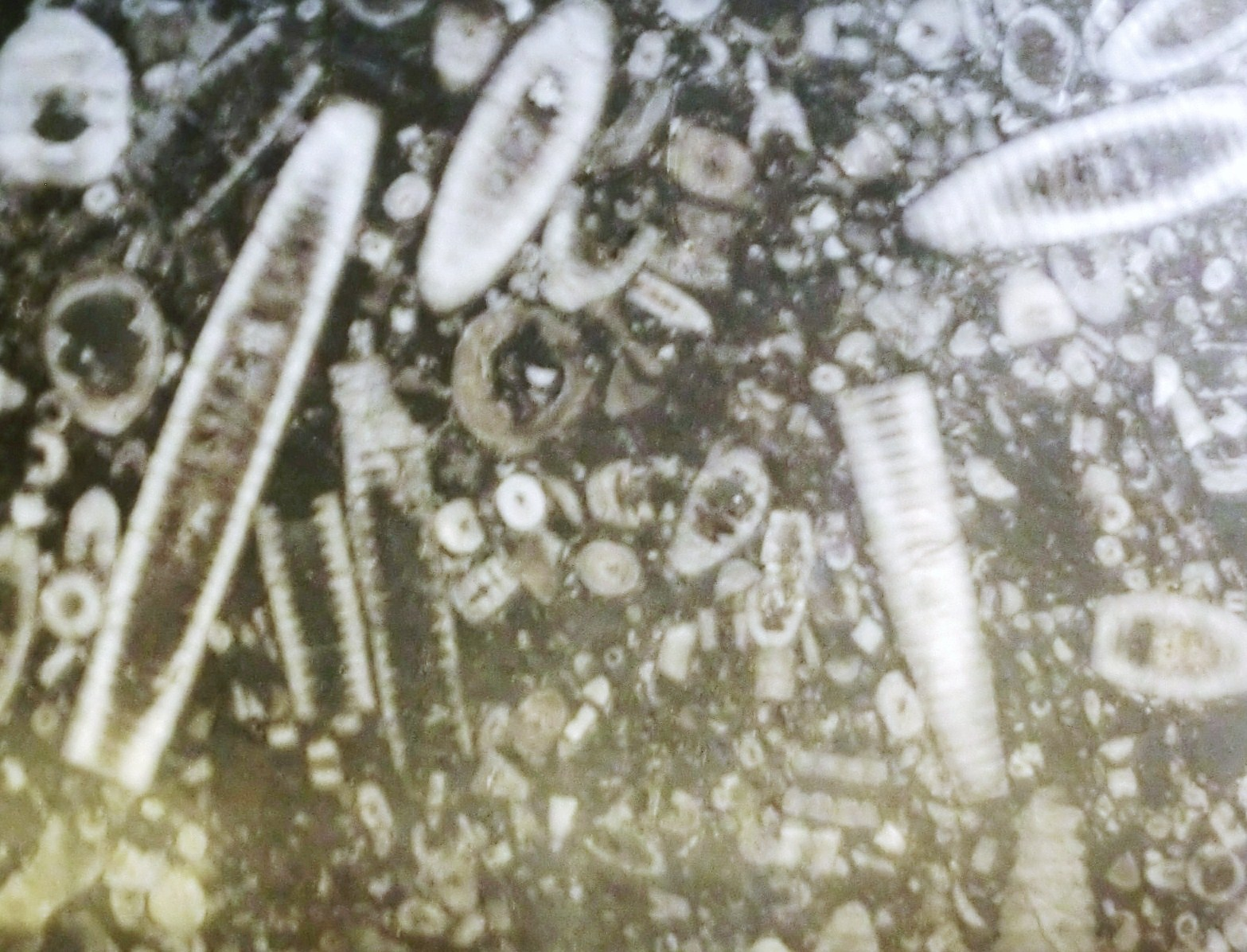
Fossil crinoids in polished Frosterley Marble.

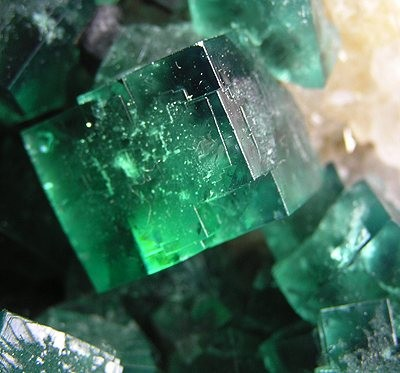
Green fluorite specimen, about 13x9 cm, from the Rogerley Mine.
