= Weardale =

Open valley in County Durham, England

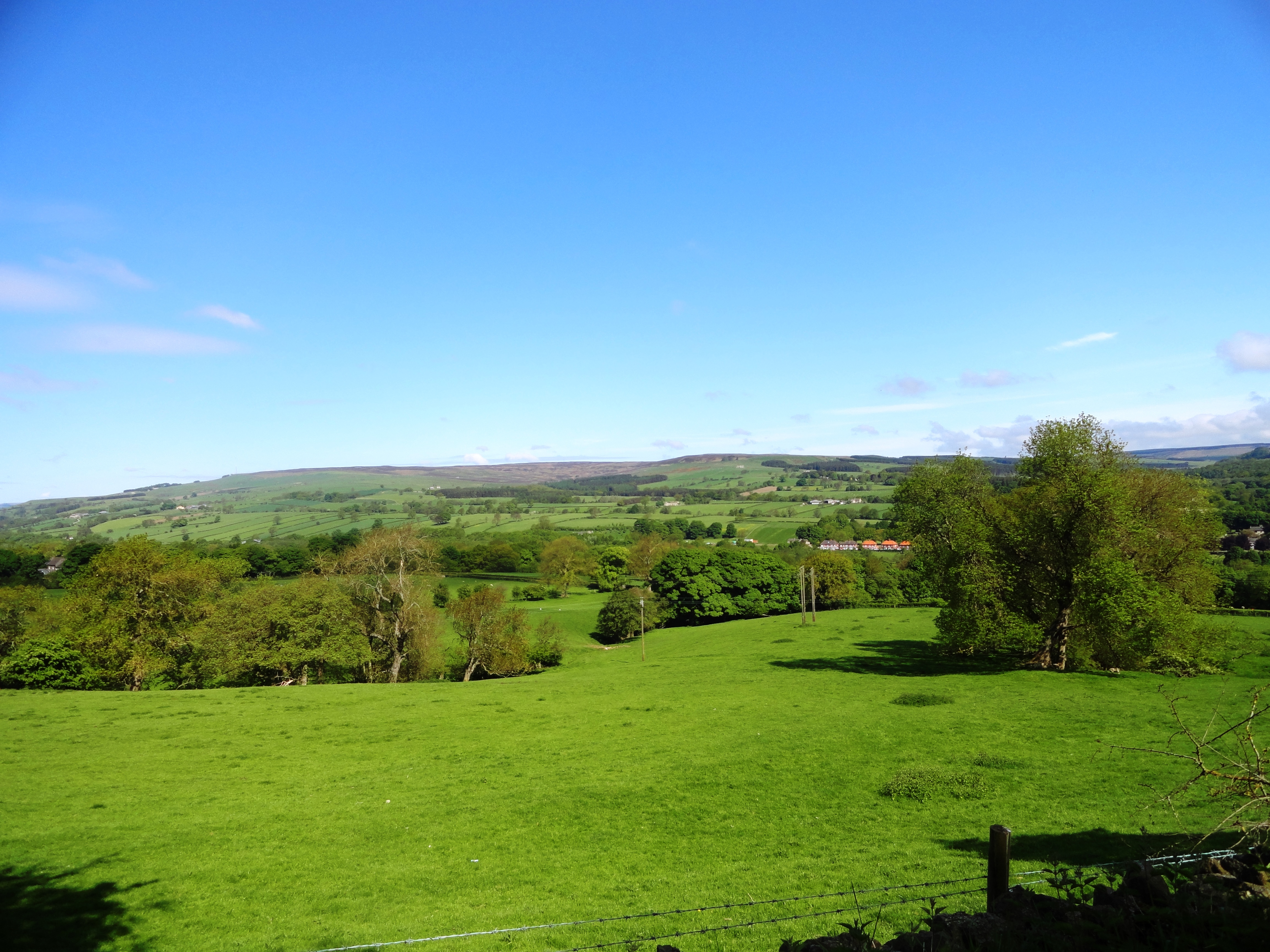
- A general view of the valley

Geography
- Location: County Durham
- Country: England
- Population centers: Stanhope, Wolsingham, Bishop Auckland
- Coordinates: 54.44°N 2.082°W
- Traversed by: A689 road, W2W (north east) & Weardale Way
- River: Wear & Gaunless
- Interactive map of Weardale

Weardale is a dale, or valley, on the east side of the Pennines in County Durham, England. Large parts of Weardale fall within the North Pennines Area of Outstanding Natural Beauty (AONB) – the second-largest AONB in England and Wales. The upper dale is surrounded by high fells (up to 2,454 feet (748 m) O.D. at Burnhope Seat) and heather grouse moors. The River Wear flows through Weardale before reaching Bishop Auckland and then Durham, meeting the sea at Sunderland.

The Wear Valley local government district covered the upper part of the dale, including Weardale, between 1974 and 2009, when it was abolished on County Durham's becoming a unitary authority. (From 1894 to 1974 there was a Weardale Rural District.) Upper Weardale is in the parliamentary constituency of North West Durham. The dale's principal settlements include St John's Chapel and the towns of Crook, Stanhope and Wolsingham.

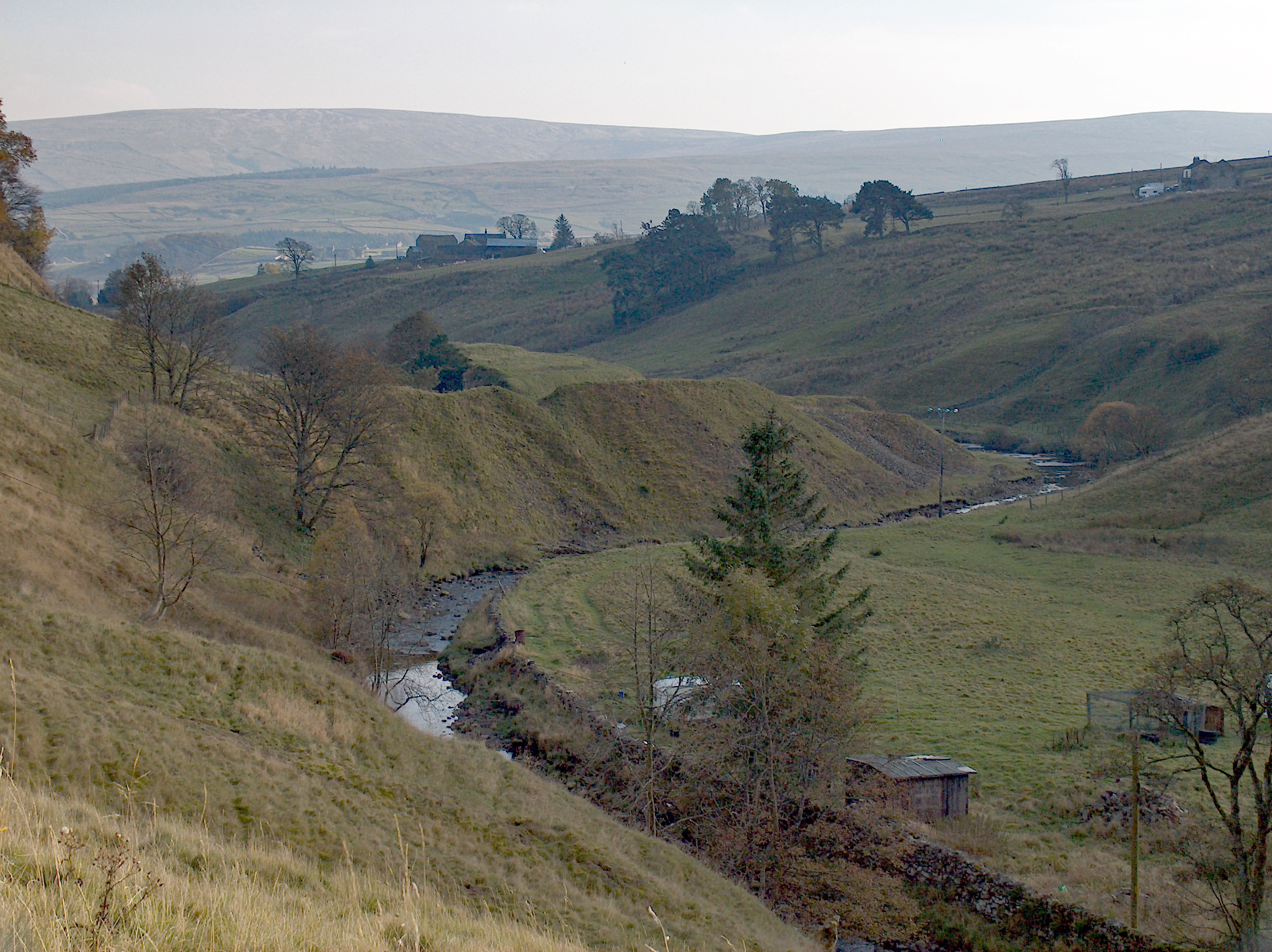
Weardale Wearhead

== Local climate ==
Weardale's winters are typically harsh and prolonged with regular snow, nowadays taken advantage of by skiers using a ski run at Swinhope Head.

== Wildlife and ecology ==
Wildlife includes an important population of black grouse, along with the more usual upland birds. Sea-trout and salmon run the River Wear whilst adders (snakes) are sometimes encountered on the moors. With regard to flora, some species-rich meadows remain, and the wood cranesbill (Geranium sylvaticum) and meadow cranesbill (G. pratense) are easy to spot in summer and the mountain pansy (Viola lutea) is a characteristic plant of the shorter grass round the upper dale. Also round the upper dale, in late spring damp places are bright with yellow marsh marigolds, of a variety (Caltha palustris minor) that is rather smaller than the ordinary marsh marigold (Caltha palustris). The tiny but beautiful spring sandwort (Minuartia verna) may be seen around old lead workings, enabled by its high tolerance of lead to colonise ground where contamination inhibits other species.

== History and historical associations ==
Past occupation or activity by man is attested by evidence such as the Heatheryburn Bronze Age collection of gold and other objects, now in the British Museum; altars placed by Roman officers who took hunting trips out from forts in present-day County Durham; and the use from Norman times of Frosterley Marble, a black fossiliferous layer of limestone occurring near that village, as an ornamental material in Durham Cathedral and many other churches and public buildings.

The small towns of Stanhope and Wolsingham appear to have existed as Anglo-Saxon settlements before the Norman Conquest of 1066. The Normans extended farming in this part of the dale, and later in the Middle Ages the upper dale was cleared for vaccaries – farms for pasturing cattle. The Bishops of Durham owned the mineral rights and the Church retained them throughout the effective life of the lead industry, miners and companies being lessees.

In 1327 Edward III led his first military campaign in Weardale. The so-called Weardale campaign against the Scots was a military failure but led to the politically important Treaty of Edinburgh–Northampton. The campaign was graphically described by a participant, the chronicler Jean Le Bel.

In 1540, John Leland described the Bishop of Durham's deer park in Weardale as 'rudely enclosed with stone of a 12 or 14 miles in compass near Westgate and Eastgate'.

In 1799, an Act of Parliament was passed for the division of common land in Weardale Common.

In the 18th century John Wesley visited the dale on a number of occasions and it became a Methodist stronghold. High House Chapel near Ireshopeburn has been claimed to be the Methodist chapel with the longest history of continuous use in the world and contains the Weardale Museum (not to be confused with the Lead Mining Museum at Killhope), which includes a room devoted to Methodist and Wesley memorabilia.

As a youth between the world wars the poet W. H. Auden walked amid the wild countryside and the relics of the lead-mining industry in and around Weardale and found them a lifelong source of inspiration. One place he visited, Rookhope, is also the setting of a border ballad, 'The Rookhope Ryde', which describes in some detail how in 1569 Weardale men drove out a party of cattle-raiders who had come down from the Roman wall area.

Among modern works 'The Last Ballad', by Helen Cannam, is a lively historical novel set in the dale in the early 19th century.

== Mining history ==
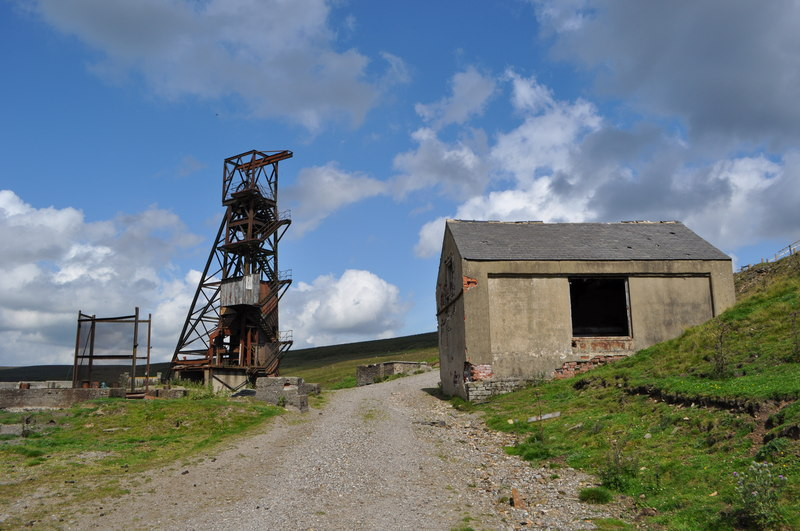
Groverake mine, Rookhope, closed in 1999 (lead and fluorspar)

Weardale was historically important for lead mining and there is a lead-mining museum incorporating the preserved Park Level Mine at Killhope (pronounced "Killup").

The first documented evidence of mining in the Northern Pennines dates from the 12th century and records the presence of silver mines in the areas of what are now Alston Moor, just west of Weardale, and Northumberland. Weardale was at that time forested and belonged to the Bishops of Durham, who used part of it as a hunting preserve. The villages of Eastgate and Westgate mark the former eastern and western entrances to this forest preserve (King, 1982).

Lead mining in Weardale reached its greatest levels during the 18th and 19th centuries, when the London Lead and Beaumont Companies dominated mining throughout the region, e.g. at the Cornish Hush Mine. During the 1880s declining prices for lead forced both companies to give up their leases in the area, though the Weardale Lead Company continued lead mining and smelting until 1931. According to Dunham (1990) 28 separate lead-smelting operations were active in the region during the height of mining in the 19th century but by 1919 the last major commercial mine had closed.

Besides lead, silver and fluorspar were extracted from Weardale. Large amounts of ironstone were taken, especially from the Rookhope area, during the Industrial Revolution to supply ironworks at Consett and other sites in County Durham. Local deposits of other minerals were also found on occasion. Ganister (hard sandstone) and dolerite (whinstone, basalt) were also quarried.

The lead-mining industry occasioned the coming and going of much of the population. Cornish miners, used to tin-mining, were one group who came to find similar work in the Pennine ore-field. Many later left Weardale for better-paid jobs in 19th-century coal mines in the North East or emigrated to the New World.

=== Fluorspar ===
A major by-product of lead-mining was various crystals including the decorative coloured fluorspar (fluorite), for which no industrial use was known until the later 19th century. Thereafter it was used in part of the steel-making process and also in the manufacture of non-stick frying pans, CFCs for aerosols and other products. It is not a precious stone but fine samples are prized by collectors. Because of europium impurities fluorite from this region glows with a bluish light under ultraviolet excitation, and the characteristic glow of fluorspar samples from this region are responsible for the word fluorescence to describe that phenomenon. Weardale fluorite is considered by collectors to be amongst the finest, and therefore most valued, in the world. Mines such as Frazers Hush, Boltsburn, Heights, Cambokeels, Blackdene, West Pastures, Greenlaws, Billings Hill and Groverake are legendary for their fine fluorite specimens. Until 2016 some of the finest green fluorite was mined at Rogerley Mine. Mineralised veins in a nearby limestone quarry were then opened up to create the Diana Maria Mine, which produces fine green fluorite specimens and the occasional purple.

The North of England Lead Mining Museum at Killhope has a huge working water wheel, known as the Killhope Wheel. It was installed in the 1870s to power the crushing of grit in tanks in an adjacent building so as to complete the separation of lead ore from worthless stone. The museum also exhibits a fine collection of local minerals, as well as 'spar boxes' – display cases made by miners to show crystal specimens they had found.

== Economy other than mining ==
After the closing of the lead mines there were few sources of income for the local population left in the upper dale.

In the lower dale round Stanhope and Frosterley, however, carboniferous limestone was quarried on a large scale from the 1840s, when rail links with Teesside and Consett enabled it to be carried to these and other places for use in the iron- and steel-making processes there. These places included Wolsingham in the lower dale, Tow Law on its fringes and Witton Park further down the dale. Of these, only a business at Tow Law persists (2009) as a going concern.

Limestone quarrying continued into and beyond the 1960s, a relatively recent and large-scale development being the quarry serving the Blue Circle cement works near Eastgate, set up in the 1960s. This site has now been decommissioned and the major industry in Weardale is now cattle- and sheep-farming. Only one mine, the Rogerley Mine, is currently being prospected on a very small scale for mineral specimens.

Weardale had a railway as far as Wearhead in three stages opened in 1847, 1862 and 1895, but the section of the line above Eastgate closed between 1961 and 1968 in another series of three closures owing to the decline of the lead industry. The remaining line was kept open by cement traffic and excursions until 1993, after which it was eventually taken over by the Weardale Railway. Passenger services recommenced briefly in 2004 but in 2005 the project went into administration. Trains began running again in 2006 under a new ownership structure. The line between Bishop Auckland and Wolsingham was reopened in May 2010. Both heritage (steam and diesel loco hauled) and community (railbus) services are worked. During the first part of 2011 it is anticipated that coal traffic will start loaded at a new terminal in Wolsingham. It will be trucked there from an opencast at nearby Tow Law. The connection to Network Rail has seen a number of through excursions during 2010, although for daily passenger traffic a separate platform called Bishop Auckland West is used. It is on the site of the former West Junction when Bishop Auckland was a triangular station. The heritage line was taken over by The Auckland Project in 2020.

Currently there is a regular Monday to Saturday bus service provided by Weardale Motor Services from Bishop Auckland and Crook to Cowshill at the head of the dale; it is possible at certain times of day to take the bus further on to the Killhope Lead Mining Museum and to return by bus from it at the times of the year when it is open.

There is a modest tourist industry, and inn/hotel, B&B and self-catering are among the types of accommodation available; there are some caravan sites. There are opportunities for pony-trekking and mountain biking as well as much scope for the walker.

== See also ==
- Weardale Granite

== Sources ==
- Smailes, AE (1960). North England. Edinburgh: Thomas Nelson & Sons Ltd.
