= DL postcode area =

Postcode area within the United Kingdom

Darlington
- Postcode area
- Location within the United Kingdom
- Coordinates: 54.533°N 1.669°W
- Sovereign state: United Kingdom
- Postcode area: DL
- Postcode area name: Darlington
- Post towns: 14
- Postcode districts: 17
- Postcode sectors: 67
- Postcodes (live): 13,282
- Postcodes (total): 16,683
- Statistics as at May 2020

The DL postcode area, also known as the Darlington postcode area, is a group of seventeen postcode districts in England, which are subdivisions of fourteen post towns. These districts cover central County Durham (including Darlington, Bishop Auckland, Ferryhill, Crook, Spennymoor, Shildon, Barnard Castle and Newton Aycliffe), northern North Yorkshire (including Northallerton, Bedale, Hawes, Leyburn, Richmond and Catterick Garrison) and a very small part of Cumbria.

Mail for the DL postcode area is processed at Tyneside Mail Centre in Gateshead, along with mail for the DH, NE, SR and TS postcode areas.

== Coverage ==
The approximate coverage of the postcode districts:

Postcode district	Post town	Coverage	Local authority area(s)
DL1	DARLINGTON	Darlington (east)	Darlington
DL2	DARLINGTON	Staindrop, Gainford, Darlington new estates	County Durham, Darlington
DL3	DARLINGTON	Darlington (west), Faverdale, Coatham Mundeville	Darlington
DL4	SHILDON	Shildon	County Durham
DL5	NEWTON AYCLIFFE	Newton Aycliffe, Heighington	County Durham
DL6	NORTHALLERTON	Northallerton (east), Ingleby Cross	North Yorkshire
DL7	NORTHALLERTON	Northallerton (west), Romanby, Leeming Bar	North Yorkshire
DL8	BEDALE	Bedale	North Yorkshire
DL8	HAWES	Hawes	North Yorkshire
DL8	LEYBURN	Coverham, Leyburn, Middleham	North Yorkshire
DL9	CATTERICK GARRISON	Catterick Garrison	North Yorkshire
DL10	RICHMOND	Richmond, Catterick, Brompton-upon-Swale, Scotch Corner	North Yorkshire
DL11	RICHMOND	Swaledale, Reeth, Low Row, Arkengarthdale	North Yorkshire
DL12	BARNARD CASTLE	Barnard Castle, Bowes, Middleton-in-Teesdale	County Durham, Westmorland and Furness
DL13	BISHOP AUCKLAND	Stanhope, Frosterley, Wolsingham, Tow Law	County Durham
DL14	BISHOP AUCKLAND	Bishop Auckland, Evenwood	County Durham
DL15	CROOK	Crook, Willington	County Durham
DL16	SPENNYMOOR	Spennymoor	County Durham
DL16	FERRYHILL		non-geographic
DL17	FERRYHILL	Ferryhill, Chilton, Cornforth, Bishop Middleham	County Durham
DL98	DARLINGTON		non-geographic

== Map ==
DL postcode area map, showing postcode districts in red and post towns in grey text, with links to nearby BD, CA, DH, HG, LA, NE, TS and YO postcode areas.

== See also ==
- List of postcode areas in the United Kingdom
- Postcode Address File
