= County Durham and Darlington Fire and Rescue Service =

Fire and rescue service in north east England

Operational area
- Country: England
- County: County Durham

Agency overview
- Established: 1 April 1948
- Chief Fire Officer: Stuart Errington

Facilities and equipment
- Stations: 15

Website
- www.ddfire.gov.uk

County Durham and Darlington Fire and Rescue Service is the statutory fire and rescue service covering an area of 2,432 km^{2} (939 square miles), for the unitary authority areas of County Durham and Darlington. The service area borders with Cleveland Fire Brigade, North Yorkshire Fire and Rescue Service, Northumberland Fire and Rescue Service, Tyne and Wear Fire and Rescue Service and Cumbria Fire and Rescue Service.

== History ==
The service was formed on 1 April 1948 as a result of the Fire Services Act 1947. The first chief fire officer was C.V Hall and was appointed this position on 19 September 1947. The large area covered by the FRS was then divided into three areas, consisting of: Divisions A-C.

== Performance ==
Every fire and rescue service in England and Wales is periodically subjected to a statutory inspection by His Majesty's Inspectorate of Constabulary and Fire & Rescue Services (HMICFRS). The inspection investigates how well the service performs in each of three areas. On a scale of outstanding, good, requires improvement and inadequate, County Durham and Darlington Fire and Rescue Service has been rated as follows:

HMICFRS Inspection County Durham and Darlington
Area	Rating 2018/19	Rating 2021/22	Description
Effectiveness	Good	Good	How effective is the fire and rescue service at keeping people safe and secure from fire and other risks?
Efficiency	Good	Good	How efficient is the fire and rescue service at keeping people safe and secure from fire and other risks?
People	Requires improvement	Good	How well does the fire and rescue service look after its people?

== Fire stations ==
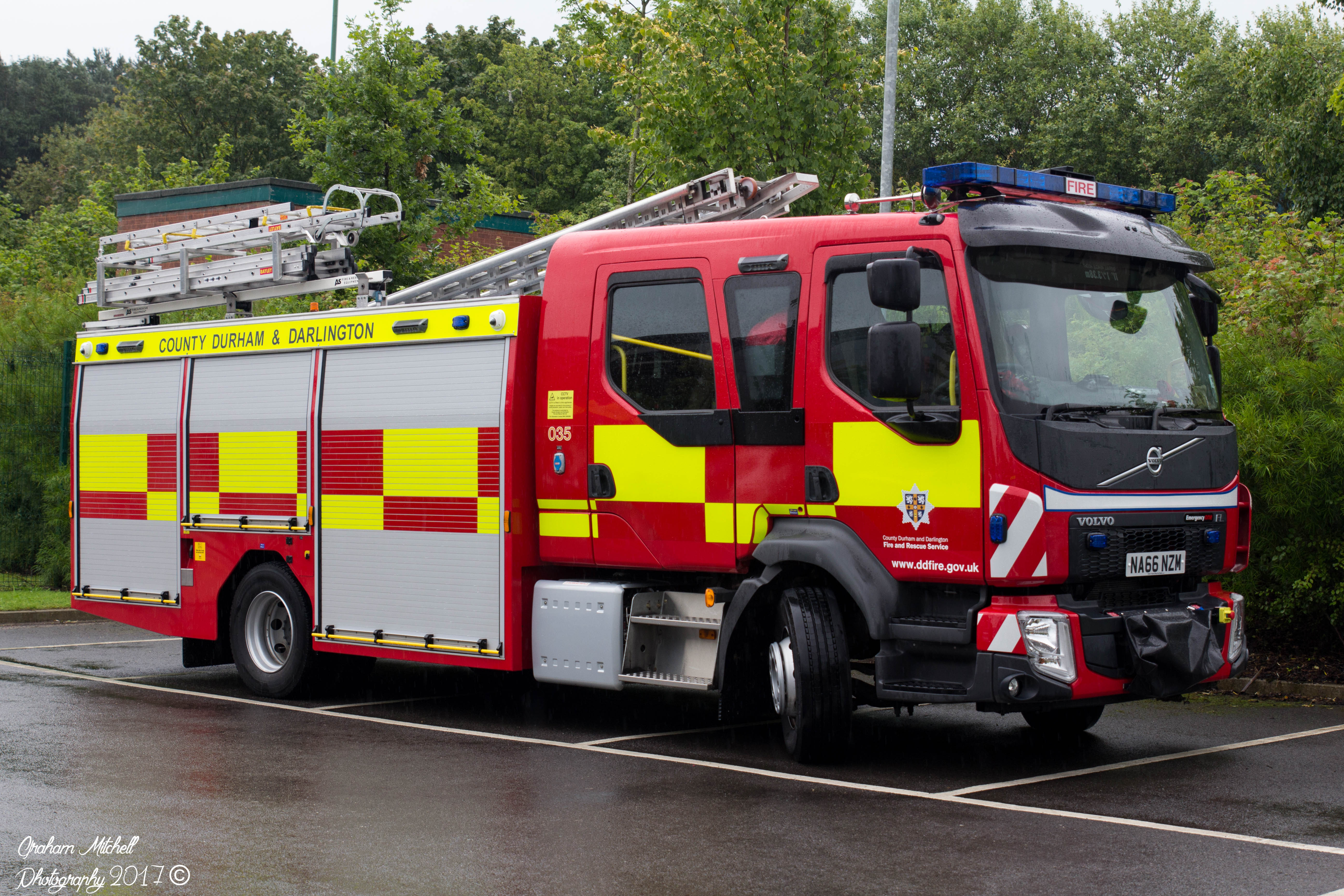
Country Durham and Darlington fire appliance outside CDDFRS headquarters

The service divides its 15 fire stations and 1 Technical Services Centre into two divisions: North and South. Fire stations are crewed by wholetime firefighters, daytime firefighters, on-call (retained) firefighters, or a combination of the different crewing systems.

The service headquarters are located in Belmont. The service operates its own training school and workshops, which are located in Bowburn.

== See also ==
- Fire service in the United Kingdom
- Fire apparatus
- Fire Engine
- FiReControl
- List of British firefighters killed in the line of duty
