= Sunderland Bridge =

Sunderland Bridge may refer to:

- Sunderland Bridge, County Durham, a bridge in county Durham, England
  - Sunderland Bridge (village), village near the bridge
- Sunderland Bridge (Massachusetts), a bridge across the Connecticut River in western Massachusetts, United States

== See also ==
- Wearmouth Bridge, the principal road bridge across the River Wear in the city of Sunderland, England, United Kingdom
  - Wearmouth Bridge (1796), original bridge across the Wear, built 1796
