= River Wear =

River in North East England

Wear
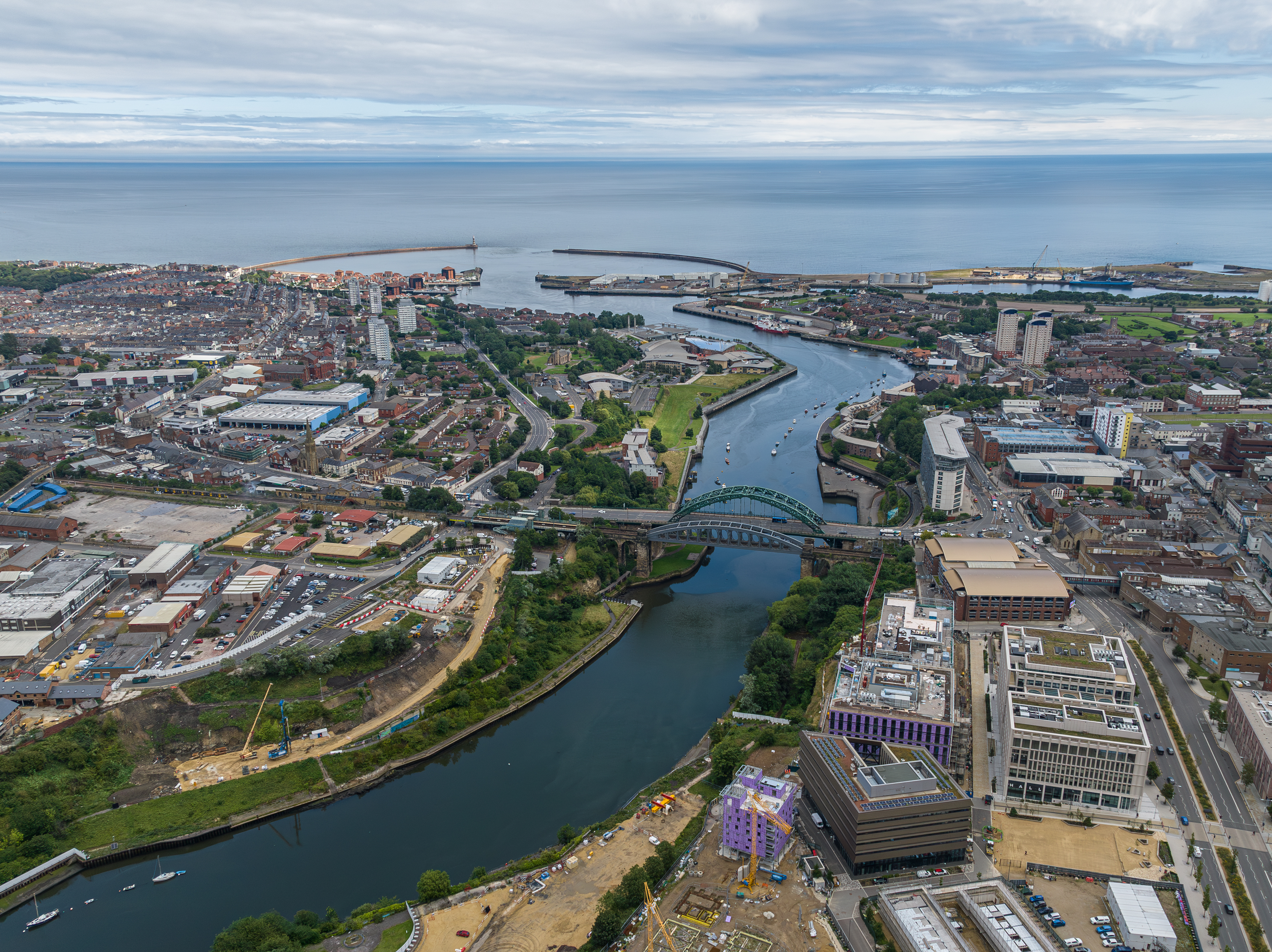
- The Wear at its mouth in the North Sea in Sunderland

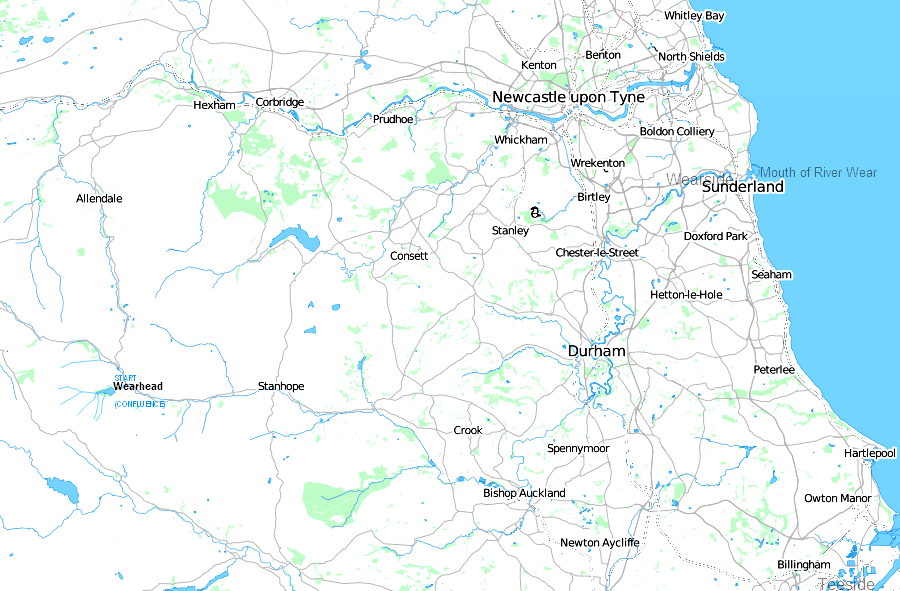
- Map of the Wear

Location
- Country: England
- County: County Durham; Tyne and Wear
- Major settlements: •Wolsingham •Bishop Auckland •Willington •Durham •Chester-le-Street •Washington •Sunderland

Physical characteristics
- Source
  - location: Wearhead
  - coordinates: 54.750°N 2.2225°W
  - elevation: 340 m (1,120 ft)
- Mouth
  - location: North Sea
  - coordinates: 54.916°N 1.3577°W
  - elevation: 0 m (0 ft)
- Length: 96 km (60 mi)

Basin features
- Tributaries
  - left: Cong Burn, South Burn, River Browney, Shittlehope Burn
  - right: Lumley Park Burn, River Gaunless, Bedburn Beck

The River Wear (/ˈwɪər/, WEER) in Northern England rises in the Pennines and flows eastwards, mostly through County Durham, to the North Sea in the City of Sunderland. At 60 mi (97 km) long, it is one of the region's longest rivers. The Wear wends in a steep valley through the cathedral city of Durham and gives its name to Weardale in its upper reach and Wearside by its mouth.

== Etymology ==
The origin behind the hydronym Wear is uncertain but is generally understood to be Celtic. The River Vedra on the Roman Map of Britain may very well be the River Wear. The name may be derived from Brittonic *wejr (<*wẹ:drā), which meant "a bend" (cf. Welsh -gwair-). An alternative but very problematic etymology might involve *wẹ:d-r-, from a lengthened form of the Indo-European root *wed- "water". Also suggested is a possible derivation from the Brittonic root *wei-, which is thought to have meant "to flow". The name Wear has also been explained as being an ancient Celtic name meaning "river of blood".

It is possible that the Wear has the same etymology as the River Wyre in Lancashire, the Quair Water in Scotland, the Weser in Germany and the Vistula in Poland.

== Geology ==
The Wear rises in the east Pennines, high on the moors of the Alston Block, an upland area raised up during the Caledonian orogeny. The Devonian-age Weardale Granite underlies the headwaters of the Wear and the whole Alston Block, but does not appear at outcrop (Note: i.e. appear on the surface) but was surmised by early geologists, and subsequently proven to exist as seen in the Rookhope borehole. It is the presence of this granite that has retained the high upland elevations of this area (less through its relative hardness, and more due to isostatic equilibrium) and accounts for heavy local mineralisation, although it is considered that most of the mineralisation occurred during the Carboniferous period.

It is thought that the course of the River Wear, prior to the last Ice Age, was much as it is now as far as Chester-le-Street. This can be established as a result of boreholes, of which there have been many in the Wear valley due to coal mining. However, northwards from Chester-le-Street, the Wear may have originally followed the current route of the lower River Team. The last glaciation reached its peak about 18,500 years ago, from which time it also began a progressive retreat, leaving a wide variety of glacial deposits in its wake, filling existing river valleys with silt, sand and other glacial till. At about 14,000 years ago, retreat of the ice paused for maybe 500 years at the city of Durham. This can be established by the types of glacial deposits in the vicinity of Durham City. The confluence of the River Browney was pushed from Gilesgate (the abandoned river valley still exists in Pelaw Woods), several miles south to Sunderland Bridge (Croxdale). At Chester-le-Street, when glacial boulder clay was deposited blocking its northerly course, the River Wear was diverted eastwards towards Sunderland where it was forced to cut a new, shallower valley. The gorge cut by the river through the Permian Magnesian Limestone (Zechstein limestone) can be seen most clearly at Ford Quarry. In the 17th edition of Encyclopædia Britannica (1990), reference is made to a pre-Ice Age course of the River Wear outfalling at Hartlepool.

The upland area of Upper Weardale retains a flora that relates, almost uniquely in England, to the end of the last Ice Age, although it almost or entirely lacks the particular rarities that make up the unique "Teesdale Assemblage" of post-glacial plants. This may, in part, be due to the Pennine areas of Upper Weardale and Upper Teesdale being the site of the shrinking ice cap, or to the difference in the surface geology, with none of the 'sugar limestone' outcrops which in Teesdale are the home of many of those plants. The glaciation left behind many indications of its presence, including lateral moraines and material from the Lake District and Northumberland, although surprisingly few drumlins. After the Ice Age, the Wear valley became thickly forested, however during the Neolithic period and increasingly in the Bronze Age, were largely deforested for agriculture.

== Industrial history ==
Much of the River Wear is associated with the history of the Industrial Revolution. Its upper end runs through lead mining country, until this gives way to coal seams of the Durham coalfield for the rest of its length. As a result of limestone quarrying, lead mining and coal mining, the Wear valley was amongst the first places to see the development of railways. The Weardale Railway continues to run occasional services between Stanhope and Wolsingham.

Mining of lead ore has been known in the area of the headwaters of the Wear since the Roman occupation and continued into the nineteenth century. Spoil heaps from the abandoned lead mines can still be seen, and since the last quarter of the twentieth century have been the focus of attention for the recovery of gangue minerals in present mining, such as fluorite for the smelting of aluminium. However, abandoned mines and their spoil heaps continue to contribute to heavy metal mineral pollution of the river and its tributaries. This has significance to fishing in times of low flow and infrastructure costs as the River Wear is an important source of drinking water for many of the inhabitants along its course.

Fluorite is another mineral sporadically co-present with Weardale Granite and became important in the manufacture of steel from the late 19th century into the 20th century. In many cases the steel industries were able to take fluorite from old excavation heaps. Fluorite explains why iron and steel manufacture flourished in the Wear valley, Consett and Teesside during the nineteenth century. Overlying are three Carboniferous minerals: limestone, Coal Measures as raw materials for iron and steel manufacture, and sandstone, useful as a refractory material. The last remaining fluorite mine closed in 1999 following legislation re water quality. A mine at Rogerley Quarry, Frosterley, is operated by an American consortium who occasionally work it for specimen minerals.

Minco are currently exploring the North Pennines and the upper Wear catchment for potential reserves of zinc at lower levels.

Ironstone which was important as the ore was won from around Consett and Tow Law, then around Rookhope, while greater quantities were imported from just south of the southerly Tees in North Yorkshire. These sources were in due course depleted or became uneconomic.

The former cement works at Eastgate, until recently run by Lafarge, was based on an inlier of limestone. The site recently gained planning permission to form a visitor complex showcasing an eco-village using alternative technology, including a "hot rocks" water heating system. The underlying granite has been drilled and reports confirm their presence. Bardon Aggregates continue to quarry at Heights near Westgate and operate a tarmac "blacktop" plant on site.

Mineral extraction has also occurred above St John's Chapel with the extraction of ganister which was used in the steel process at Consett. Around Frosterley, limestone, sand (crushed sandstone) and Frosterley Marble have been worked and the Broadwood Quarry recently expanded into ground held on an old licence. The crushing plant continues to operate. A quarry at Bollihope was also mooted on a similar basis but plans seem to have been discontinued. Frosterley Marble was used extensively in church architecture, there are local examples in St Michael's church Frosterley and Durham Cathedral.

== Course ==
Rising in the east Pennines, its head waters consist of several streams draining from the hills between Killhope Law and Burnhope Seat. The source of the river is traditionally held to be at Wearhead, County Durham at the confluence of Burnhope Burn and Killhope Burn. The Wear is a spate river and has been heavily influenced by previous government funded drainage schemes (gripping) with a view to improving marginal agricultural land. The river rises very quickly and has experienced much heavy flooding resulting in enhanced river bank erosion.

The river flows eastwards through Weardale, one of the larger valleys of west County Durham, subsequently turning south-east, and then north-east, meandering its way through the Wear Valley still in County Durham to the North Sea where it outfalls at Wearmouth in the main locality of Monkwearmouth on Wearside in the City of Sunderland. Prior to the creation of Tyne and Wear, the Wear had been the longest river in England with a course entirely within one county. The Weardale Way, a long-distance public footpath, roughly follows the entire route, including the length of Killhope Burn.

=== Wearhead to Bishop Auckland ===
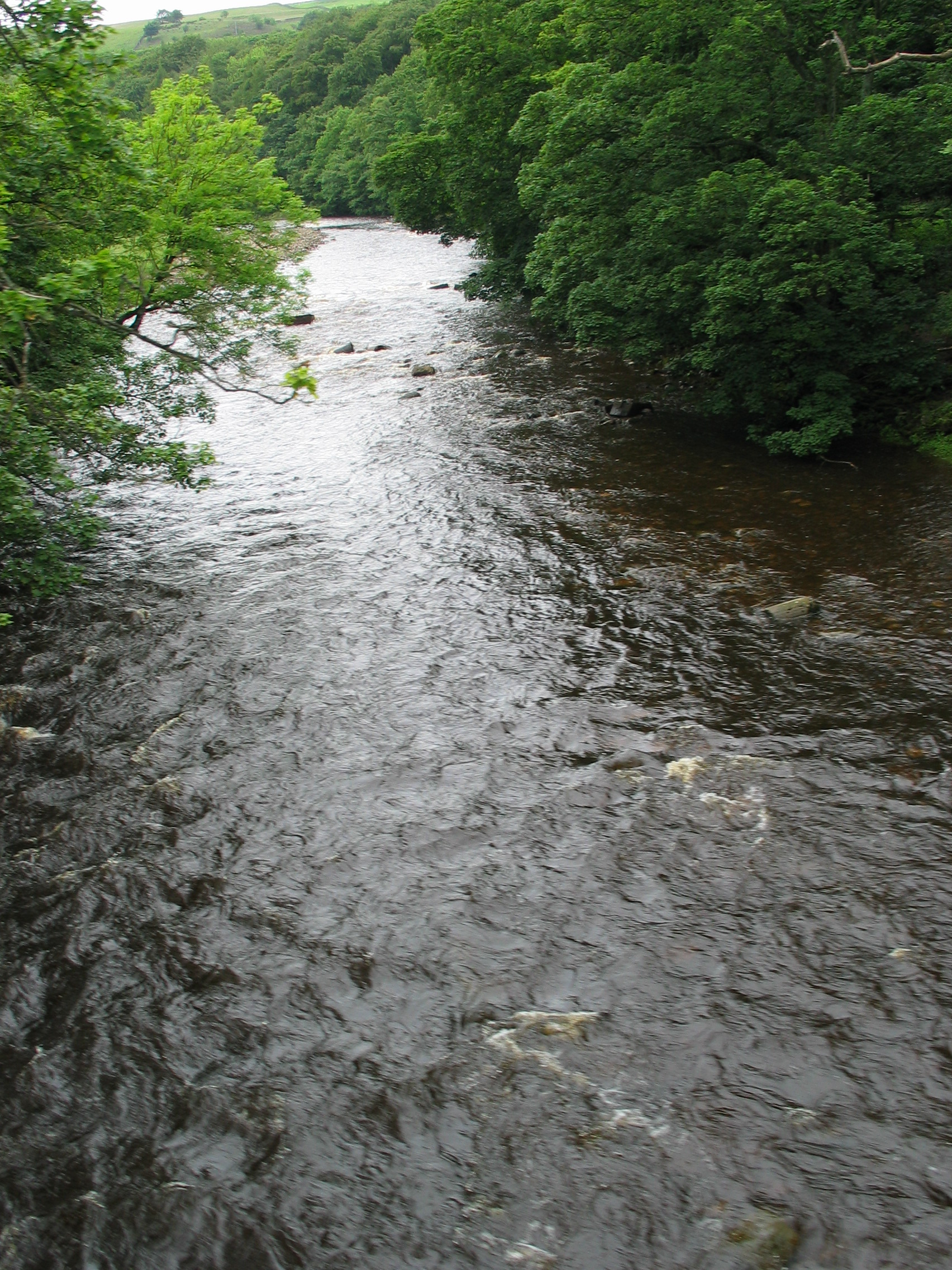
The wooded riverbanks of the Wear as it flows from Stanhope to Frosterley

There are several towns, sights and tourist places along the length of the river. The market town of Stanhope is known in part for the ford across the river. From here the river is followed by the line of the Weardale Railway, which crosses the river several times, through Frosterley, Wolsingham, and Witton-le-Wear to Bishop Auckland.

=== Bishop Auckland to Durham ===
On the edge of Bishop Auckland the Wear passes below Auckland Park and Auckland Castle, the official residence of the Bishop of Durham and its deer park. A mile or so downstream from here, the Wear passes Binchester Roman Fort, Vinovia, having been crossed by Dere Street, the Roman road running from Eboracum (now York) to Coria (now Corbridge) close to Hadrian's Wall. From Bishop Auckland the River Wear meanders in a general northeasterly direction, demonstrating many fluvial features of a mature river, including wide valley walls, fertile flood plains and ox-bow lakes. Bridges over the river become more substantial, such as those at Sunderland Bridge (near Croxdale), and Shincliffe. At Sunderland Bridge the River Browney joins the Wear.

=== Durham ===
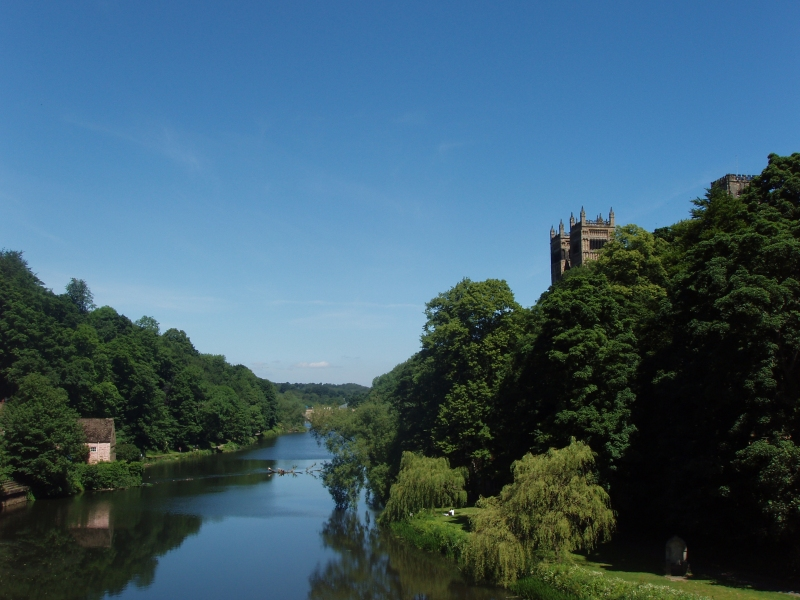
The wooded riverbanks of the Wear as it flows through Durham.

When it reaches the city of Durham the River Wear passes through a deep, wooded gorge, from which several springs emerge, historically used as sources of potable water. A few coal seams are visible in the banks. Twisting sinuously in an incised meander, the river has cut deeply into the "Cathedral Sandstone" bedrock. The high ground (bluffs) enclosed by this meander is known as the Peninsula, forming a defensive enclosure, at whose heart lies Durham Castle and Durham Cathedral and which developed around the Bailey into Durham city. That area is now a UN World Heritage Site. Beneath Elvet Bridge are Brown's Boats (rowing boats for hire) and the mooring for the Prince Bishop, a pleasure cruiser.

The River Wear at Durham was featured on a television programme Seven Natural Wonders as one of the wonders of Northern England.

In June each year, the Durham Regatta, which predates that at Henley, attracts rowing crews from around the region for races along the river's course through the city. Seven smaller regattas and head races are held throughout the rest of the year, which attract a lower number of competitors. There are 14 boathouses and 20 boat clubs based on the Wear in Durham including University College Boat Club, the oldest Boat Club in the North of England.

The lower of the two wiers in Durham.

Two weirs impede the flow of the river at Durham, both originally created for industrial activities. The Old Fulling Mill was an archaeological museum. The museum moved to Palace Green in July 2014. The second weir, beneath Milburngate Bridge, now includes a salmon leap and fish counter, monitoring sea trout and salmon, and is on the site of a former ford. Considering that 138,000 fish have been counted migrating upriver since 1994, it may not be surprising that cormorants frequent the weir.

The river's banks also lend their name to a hymn tune Elvet Banks in the 2006 hymnbook of the Lutheran Church–Missouri Synod, used (appropriately) for a hymn for baptism.

=== Durham to Chester-le-Street ===
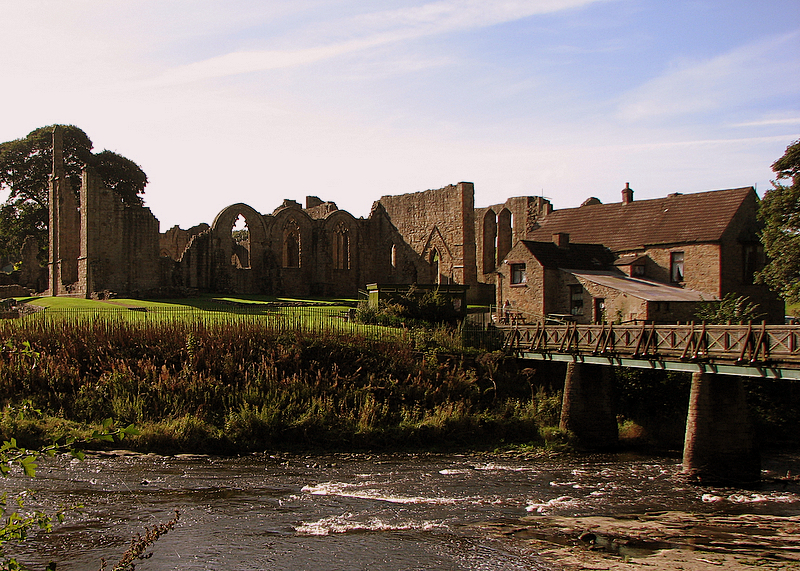
Finchale Priory on the banks of the River Wear between Durham and Chester-le-Street.

Between Durham City and Chester-le-Street, 6 miles (10 km) due north, the River Wear changes direction repeatedly, flowing south westwards several miles downstream having passed the medieval site of Finchale Priory, a former chapel and later a satellite monastery depending on the abbey church of Durham Cathedral. Two miles downstream, the river is flowing south eastwards. The only road bridge over the Wear between Durham and Chester-le-Street is Cocken Bridge. As it passes Chester-le-Street, where the river is overlooked by Lumley Castle, its flood plain has been developed into The Riverside, the home pitch of Durham County Cricket Club. Passing through the Lambton Estate and near Lambton Castle the river becomes tidal, and navigable.

=== Chester-le-Street to Sunderland ===
On exiting the Lambton estate the river leaves County Durham and enters the City of Sunderland, specifically the southern/south-eastern edge of the new town of Washington. At Fatfield the river passes beneath Worm Hill, around which the Lambton Worm is reputed to have curled its tail.

Already the riverbanks are showing evidence of past industrialisation, with former collieries and chemical works. A little further downstream the river passes beneath the Victoria Viaduct, (formally called the Victoria Bridge). Named after the newly crowned queen, the railway viaduct opened in 1838, was the crowning achievement of the Leamside Line, then carrying what was to become the East Coast Main Line. A mile to the east is Penshaw Monument, a local iconic landmark. As the river leaves the environs of Washington, it forms the eastern boundary of Washington Wildfowl Trust.

=== Sunderland ===
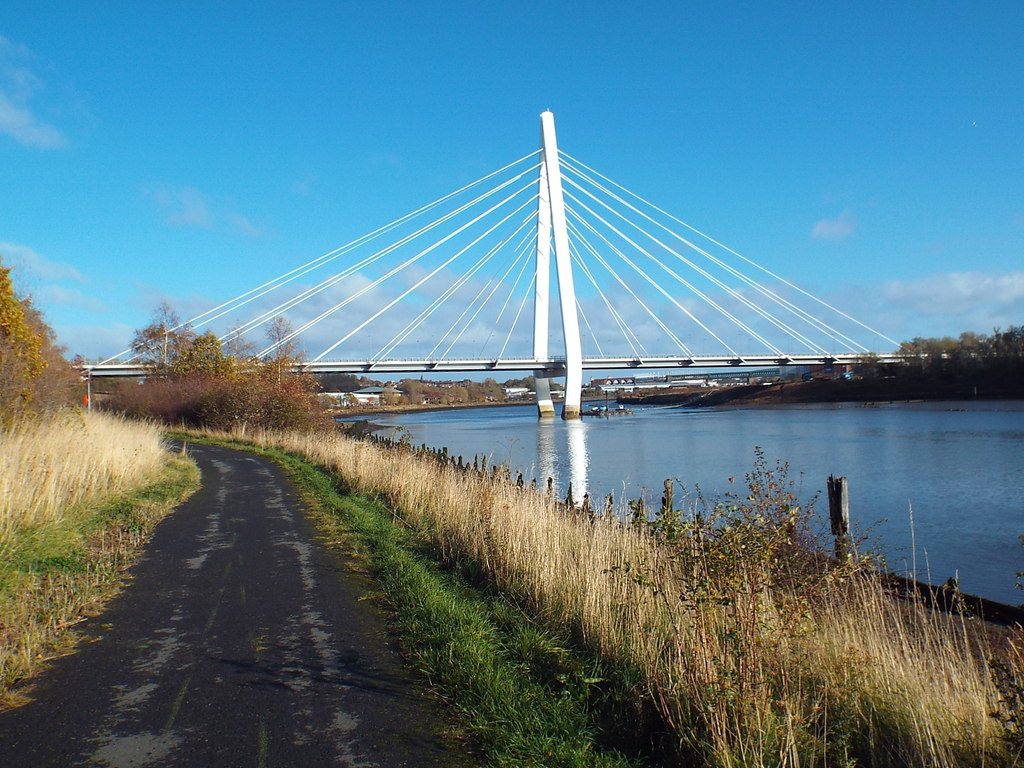
The Northern Spire before Sunderland City Centre

Having flowed beneath the A19 trunk road, the river enters the suburbs of Sunderland. The riverbanks show further evidence of past industrialisation, with former collieries, engineering works and dozens of shipyards. In their time, Wearside shipbuilders were some of the most famous and productive shipyards in the world. The artist L. S. Lowry visited Sunderland repeatedly and painted pictures of the industrial landscape around the river.

Five bridges cross the Wear in Sunderland: the Northern Spire Bridge to the west, the Queen Alexandra Bridge, and Keel Crossing, Monkwearmouth Railway Bridge, and Wearmouth Bridge in the city centre. On both banks at this point there are a number of modern developments, notably Sunderland A.F.C.'s Stadium of Light and others belonging to the University of Sunderland (St. Peter's Campus; Scotia Quay residences) and to the National Glass Centre. A riverside sculpture trail runs alongside this final section of its north bank. The St Peter's Riverside Sculpture Project was created by Colin Wilbourn, with crime novelist and ex-poet Chaz Brenchley. They worked closely with community groups, residents and schools.

As the river approaches the sea, the north bank at Roker has a substantial residential development and marina. A dolphin nicknamed Freddie was a frequent visitor to the marina, attracting much local publicity. However, concern was expressed that acclimatising the dolphin to human presence might put at risk the safety of the dolphin regarding the propellers of marine craft. The south bank of the river is occupied by the Port of Sunderland. The River Wear flows out of Sunderland between Roker Pier and South Pier, and into the North Sea.

== In art and literature ==
An engraving of a painting by William Andrews Nesfield showing a fisherman in the river was published in Fisher's Drawing Room Scrap Book, 1838, along with a poetical illustration by Letitia Elizabeth Landon.

== See also ==
- List of crossings of the River Wear
- List of rivers of England
- Rowing clubs on the River Wear
- Harry Watts – multiple River Wear life-saver

== Gallery ==
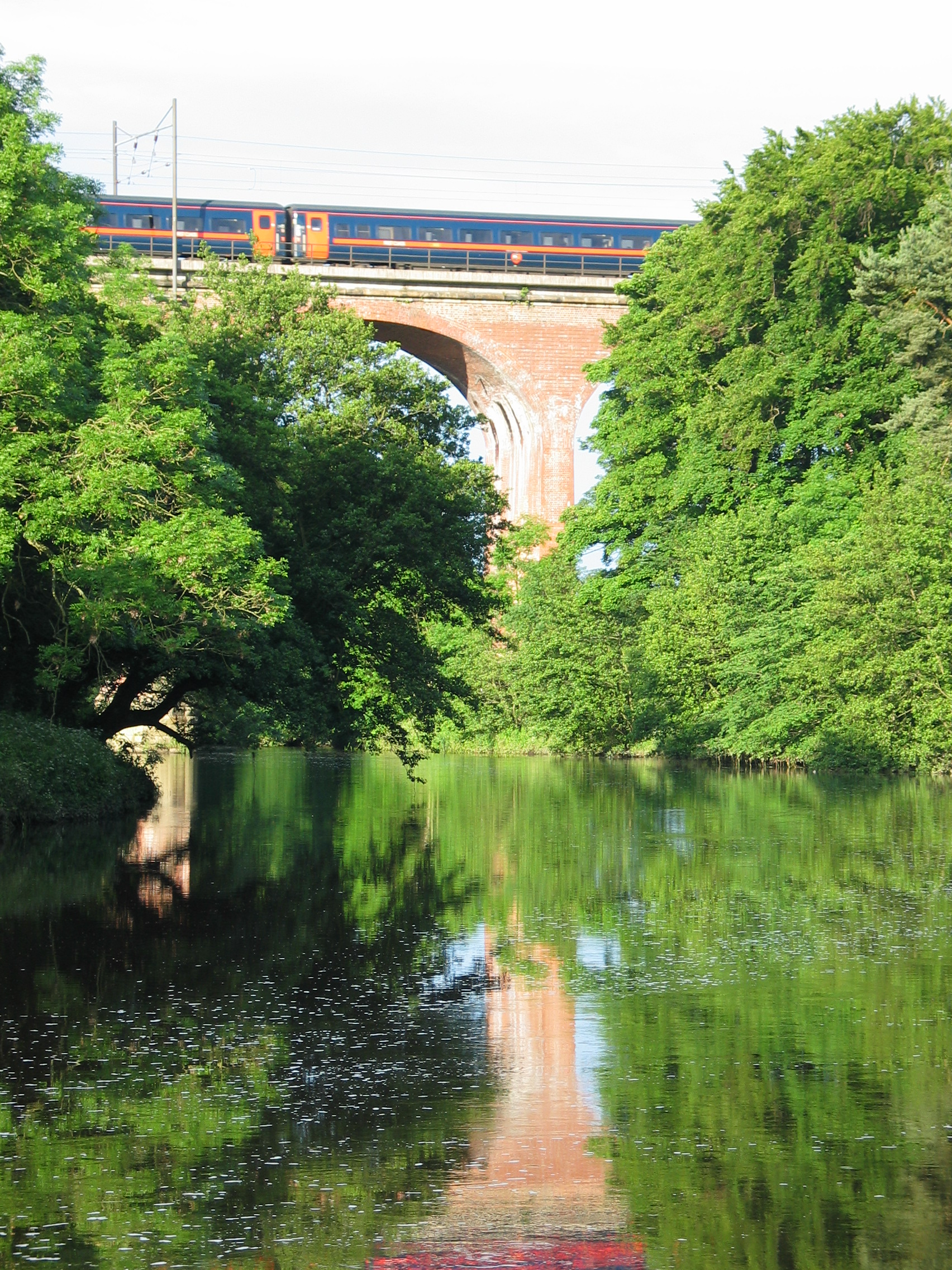
Croxdale Viaduct carrying the East Coast Main Line

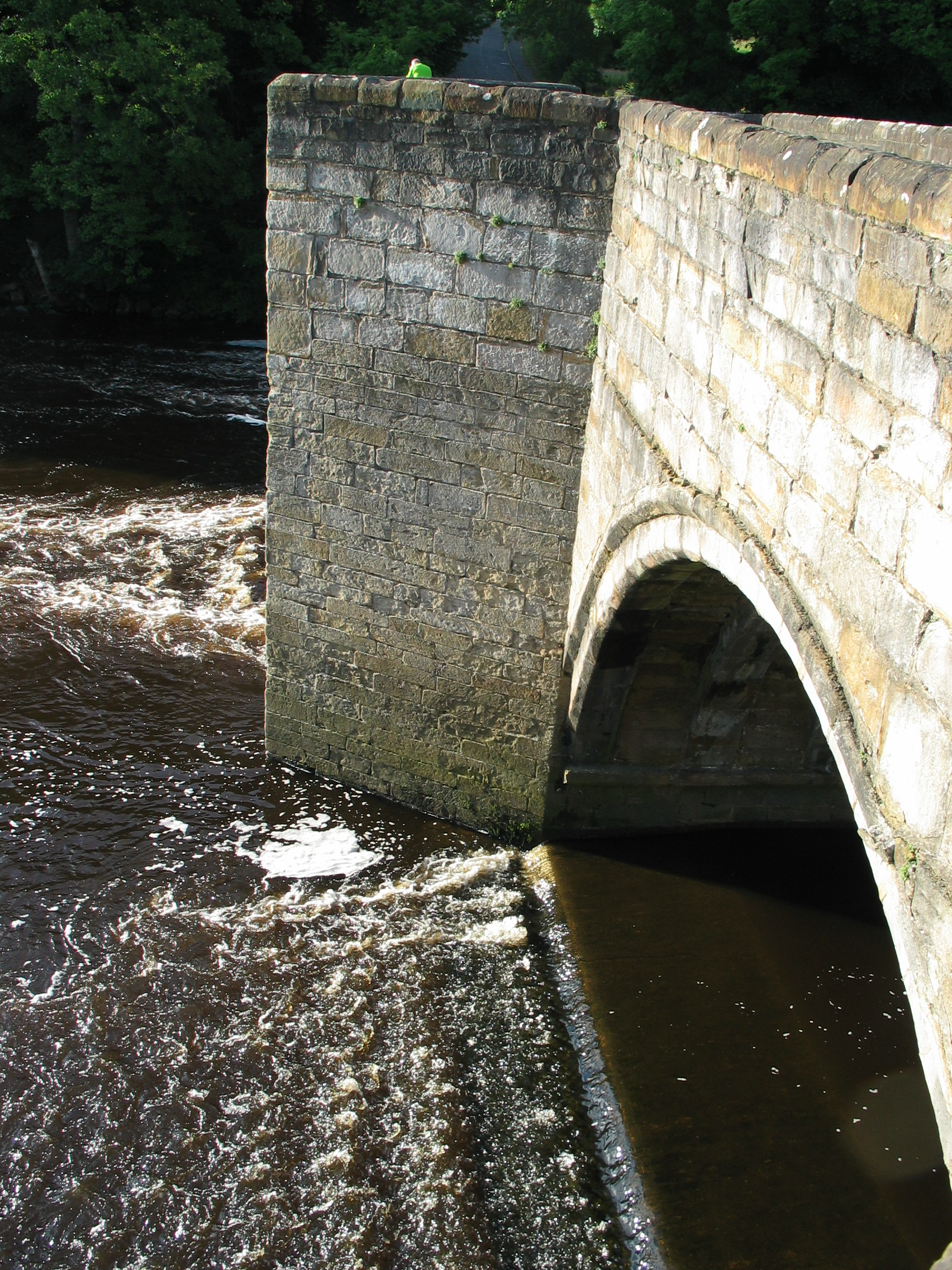
Sunderland Bridge

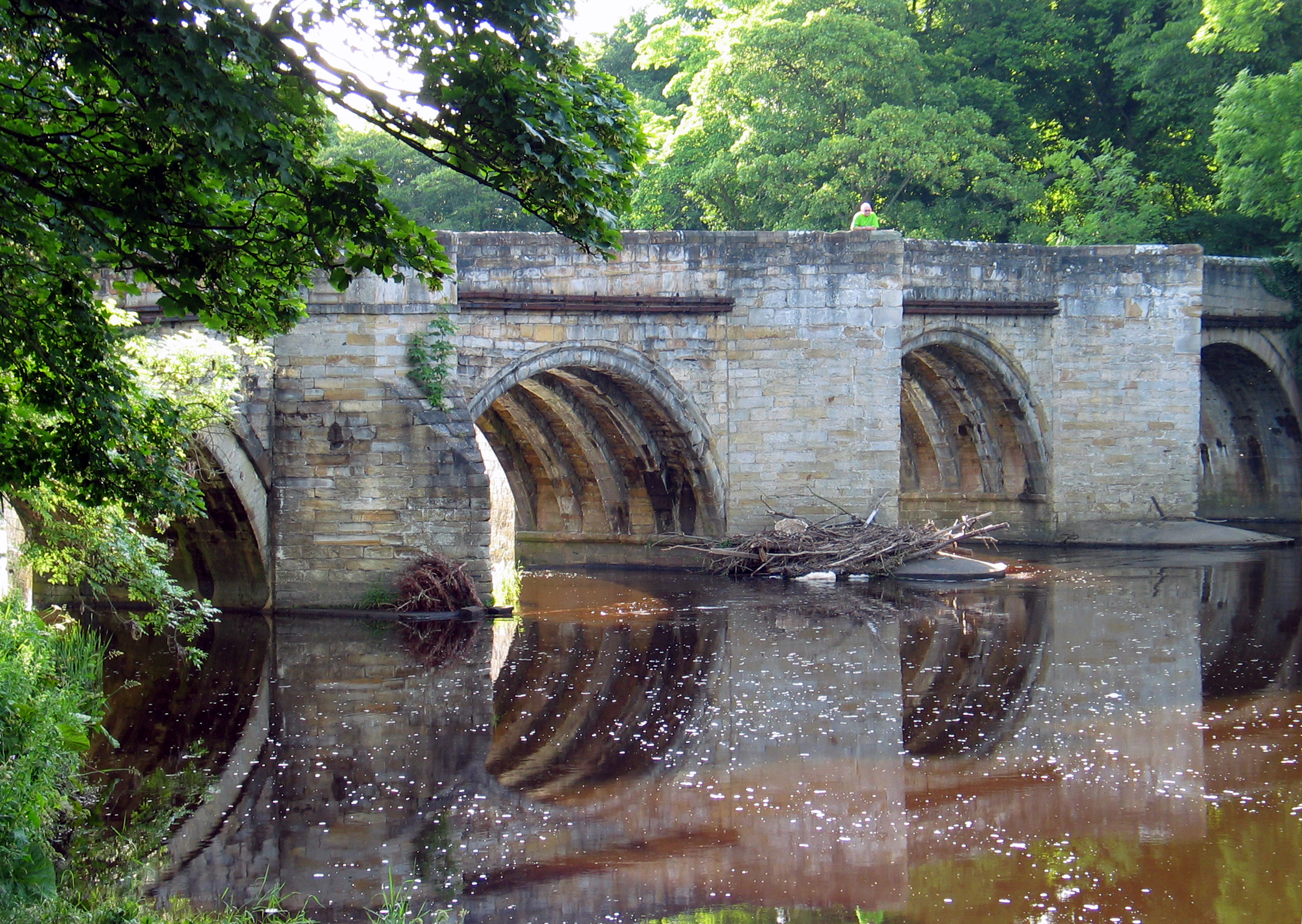
Sunderland Bridge

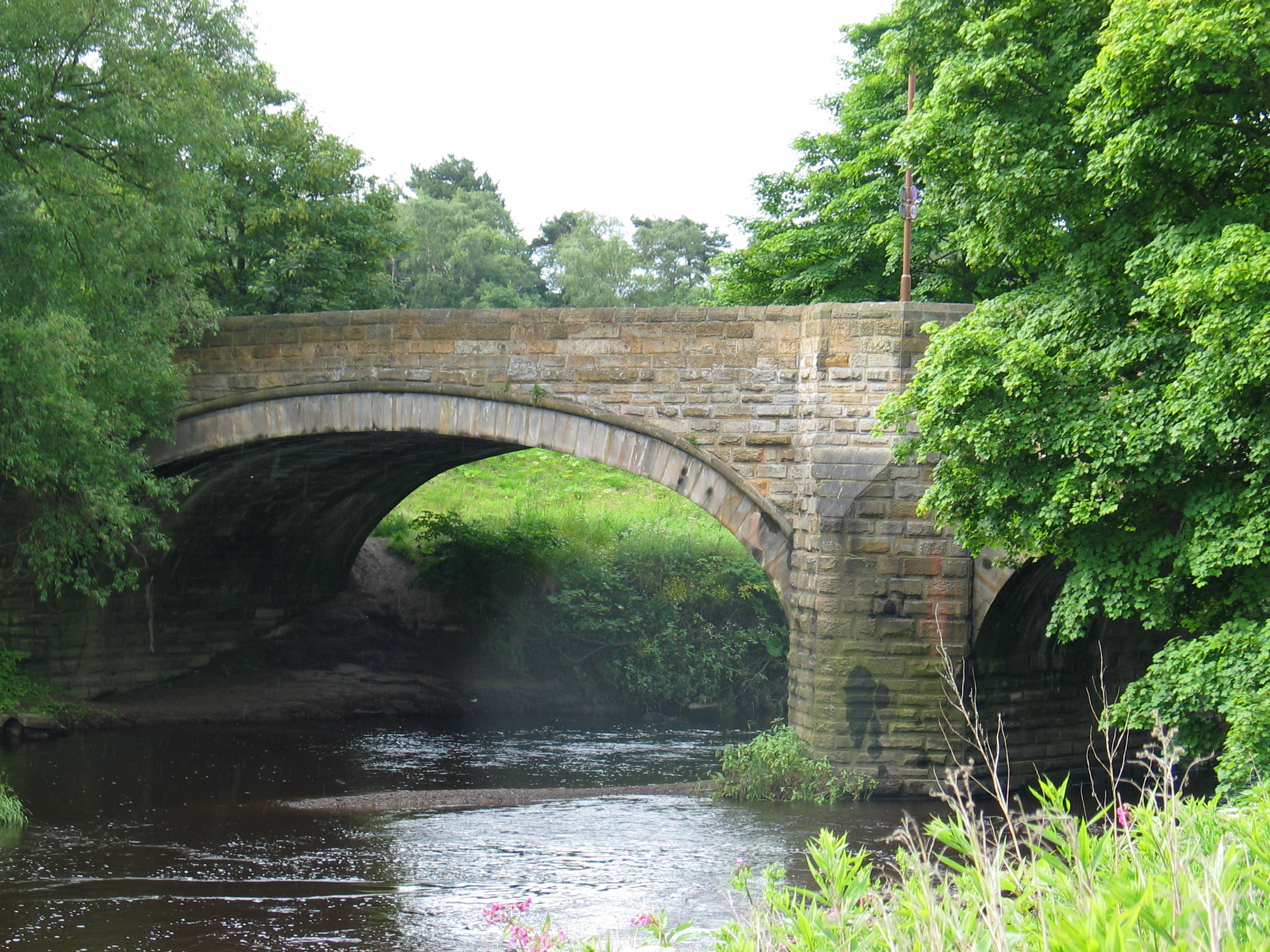
The 1826 stone bridge at Shincliffe

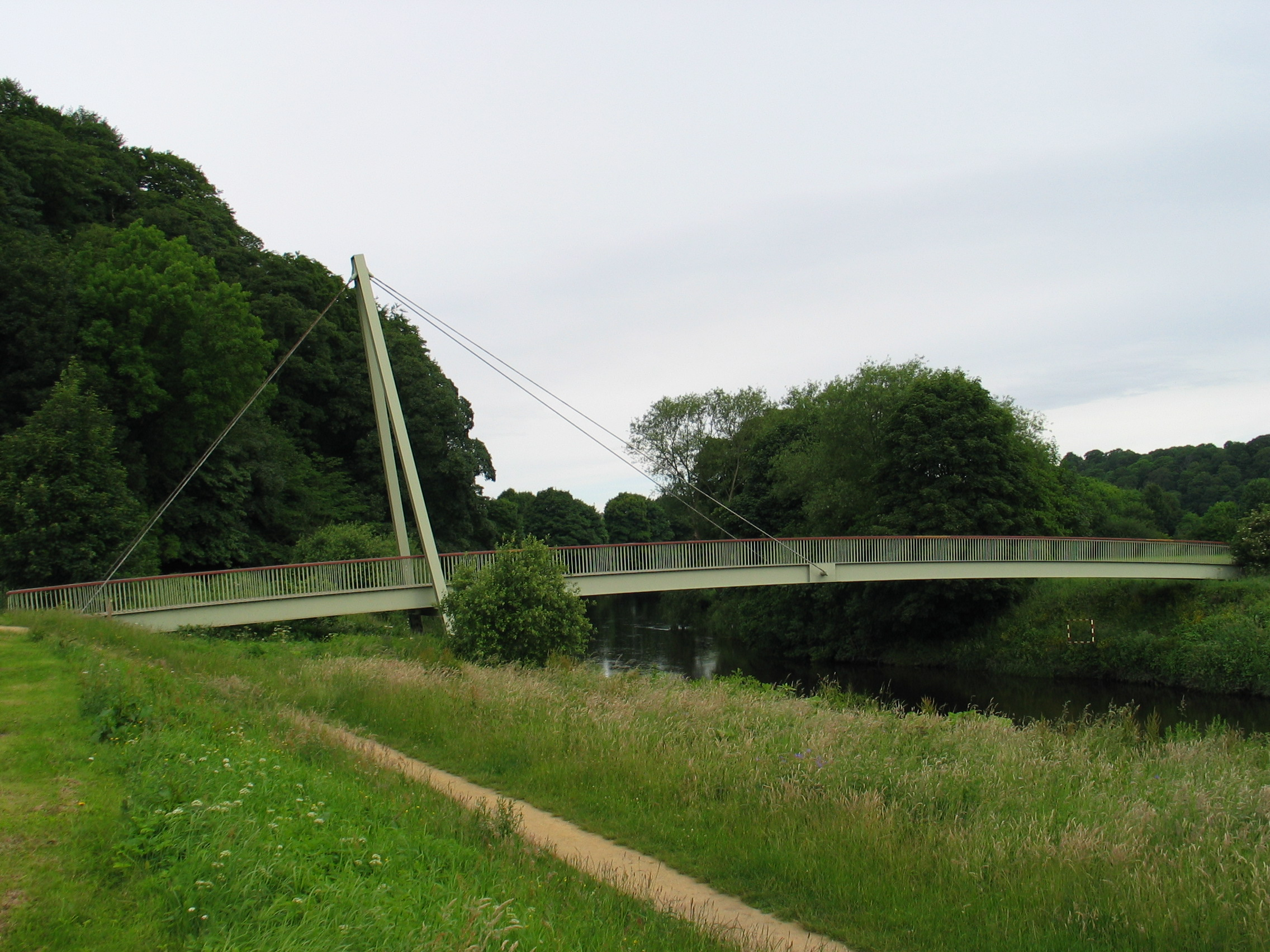
Maiden Castle footbridge

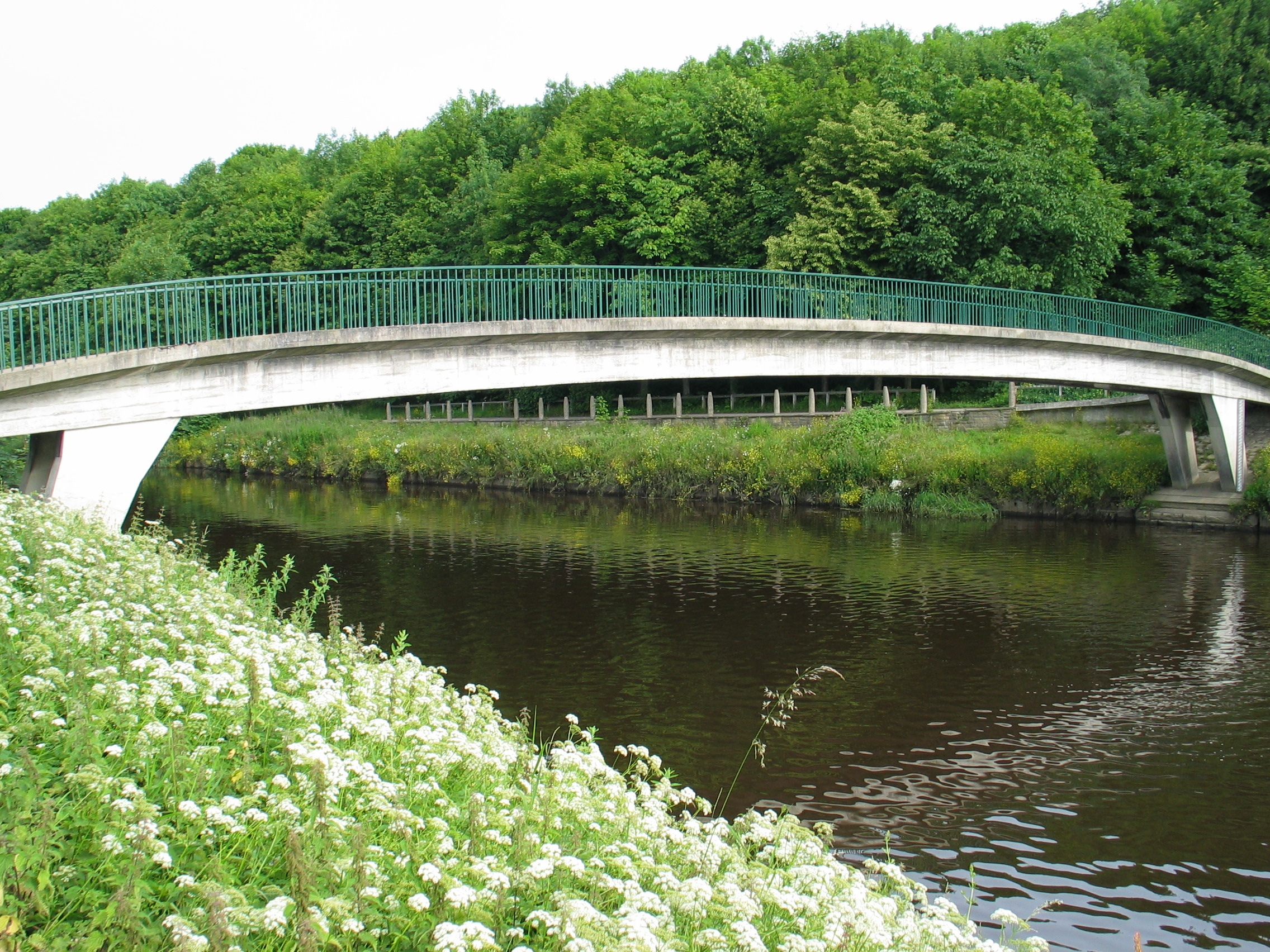
Baths Bridge

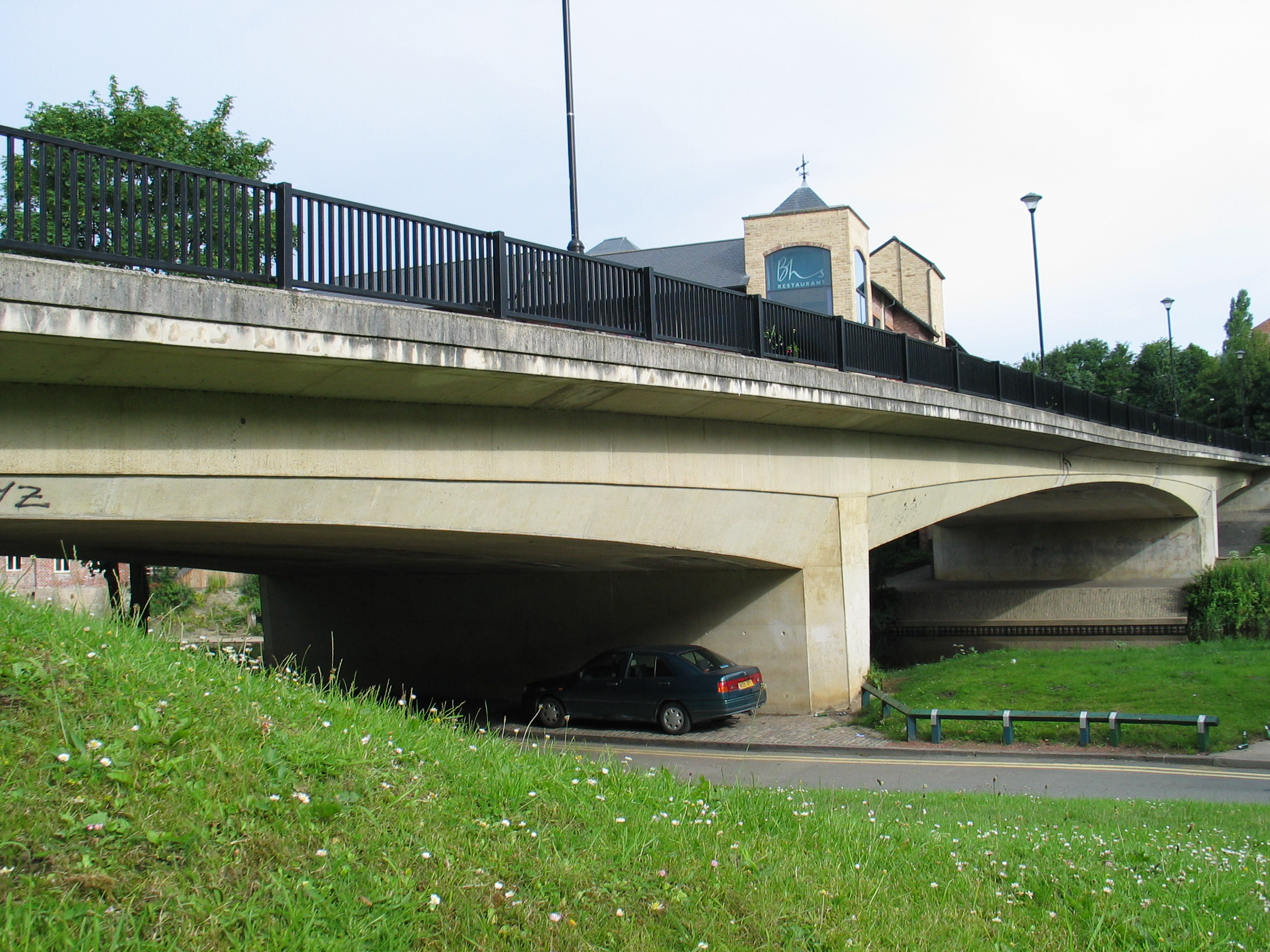
New Elvet Bridge

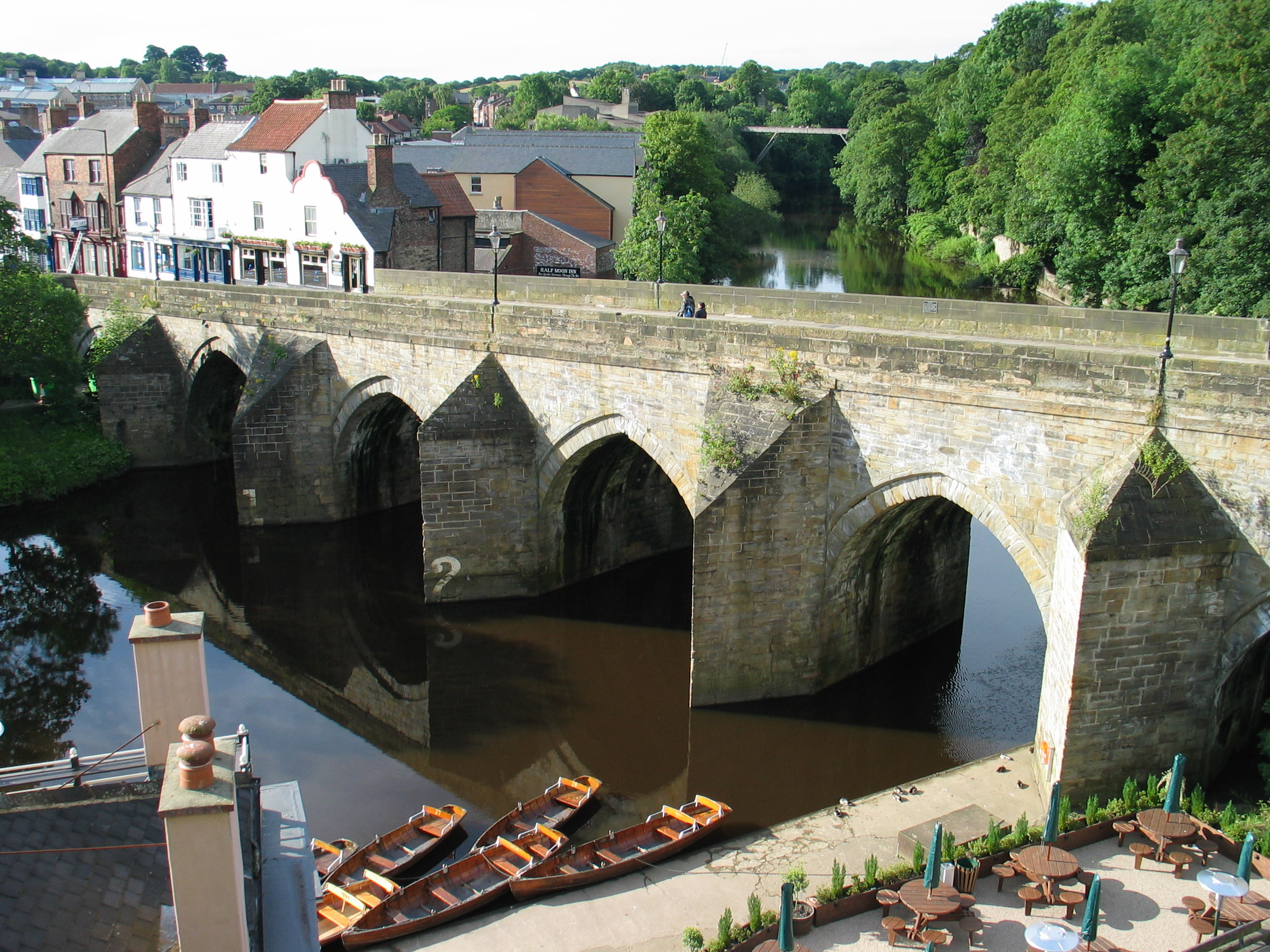
Elvet Bridge

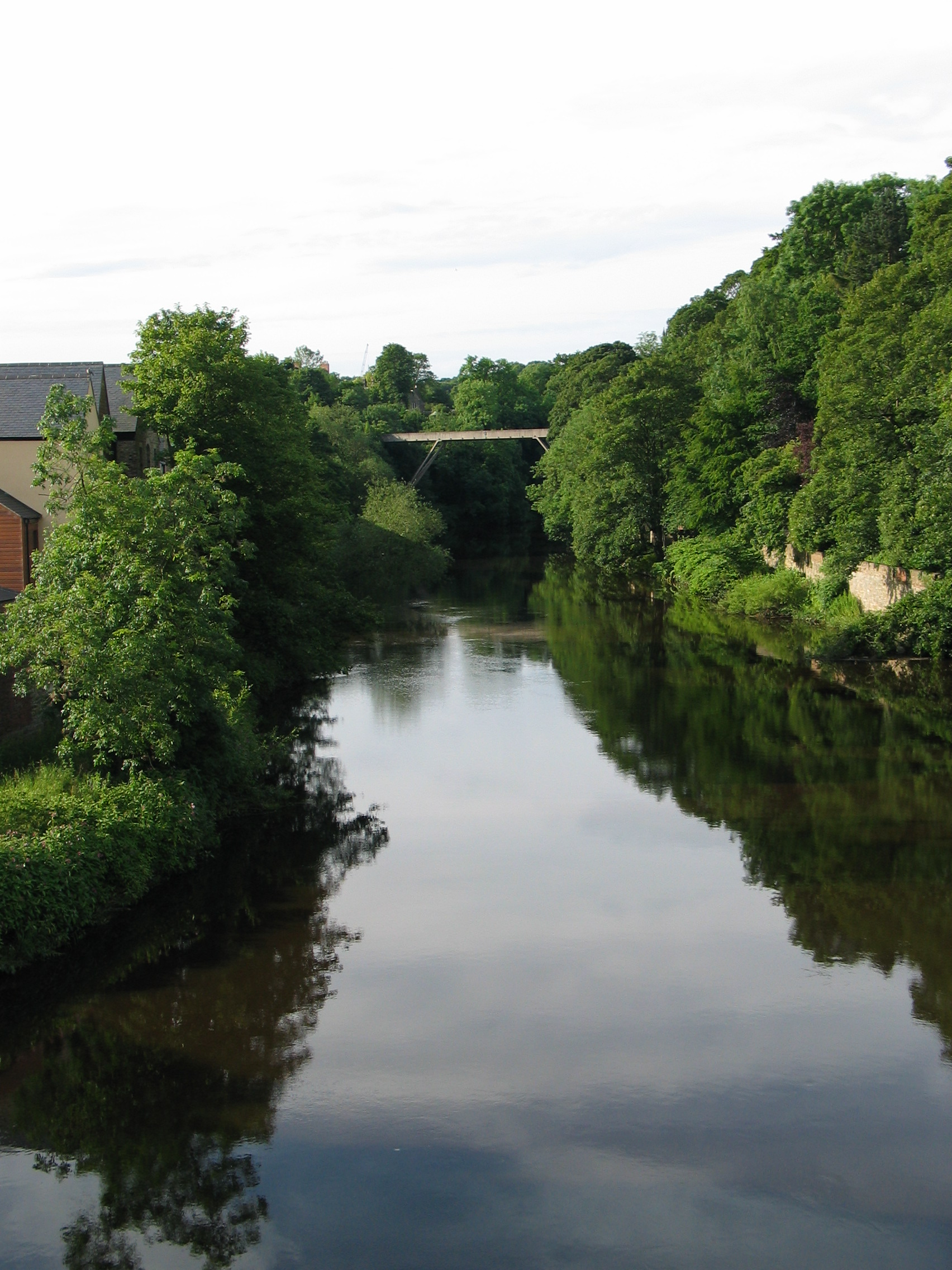
looking towards Kingsgate Bridge

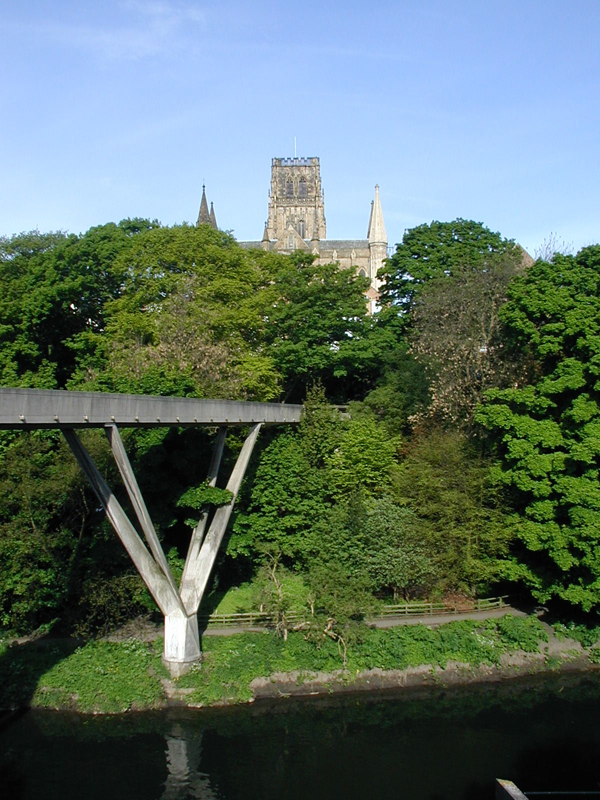
Kingsgate Bridge

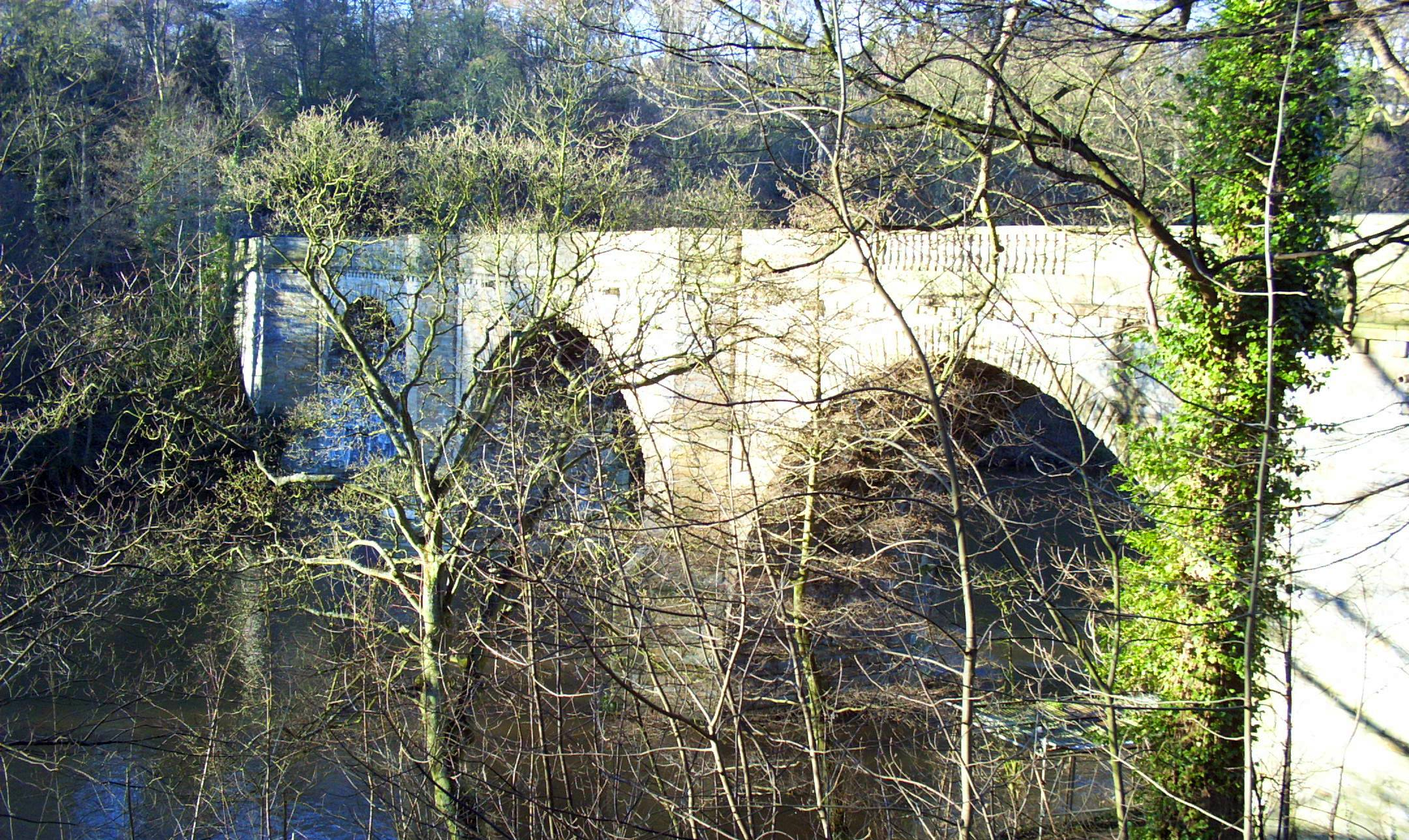
Prebends Bridge

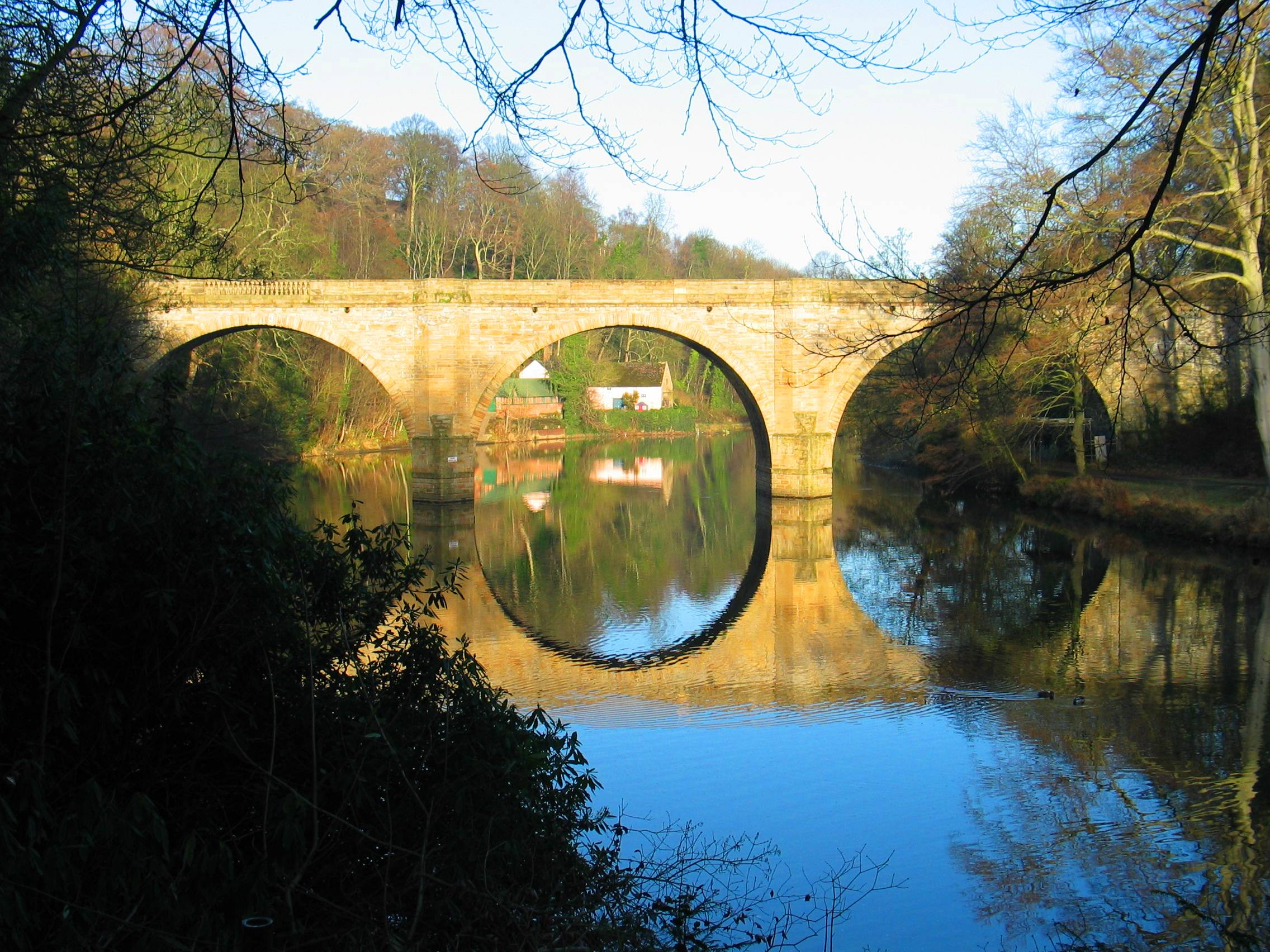
Prebends Bridge

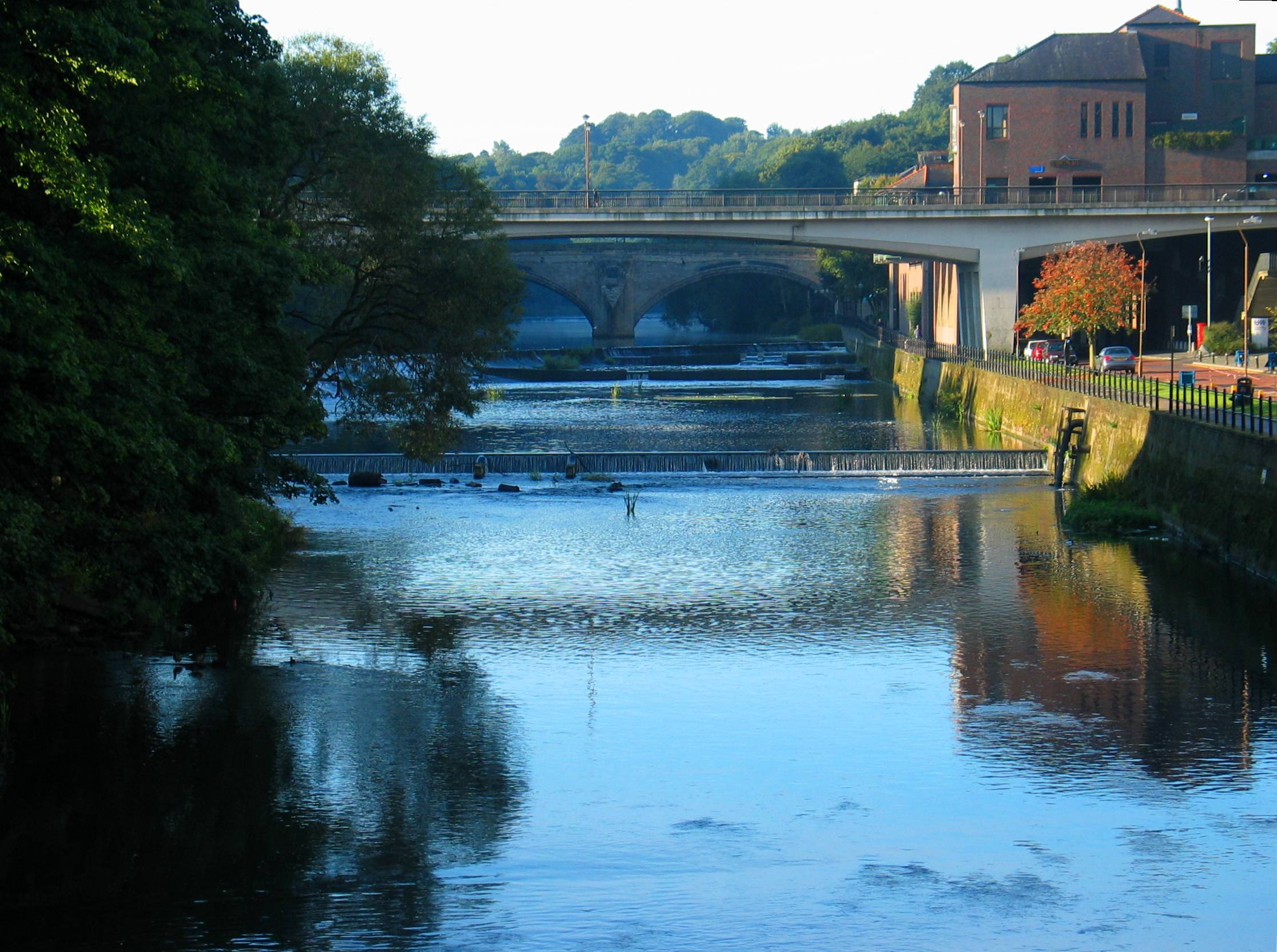
Milburngate Bridge (foreground) and Framwellgate Bridge (background)

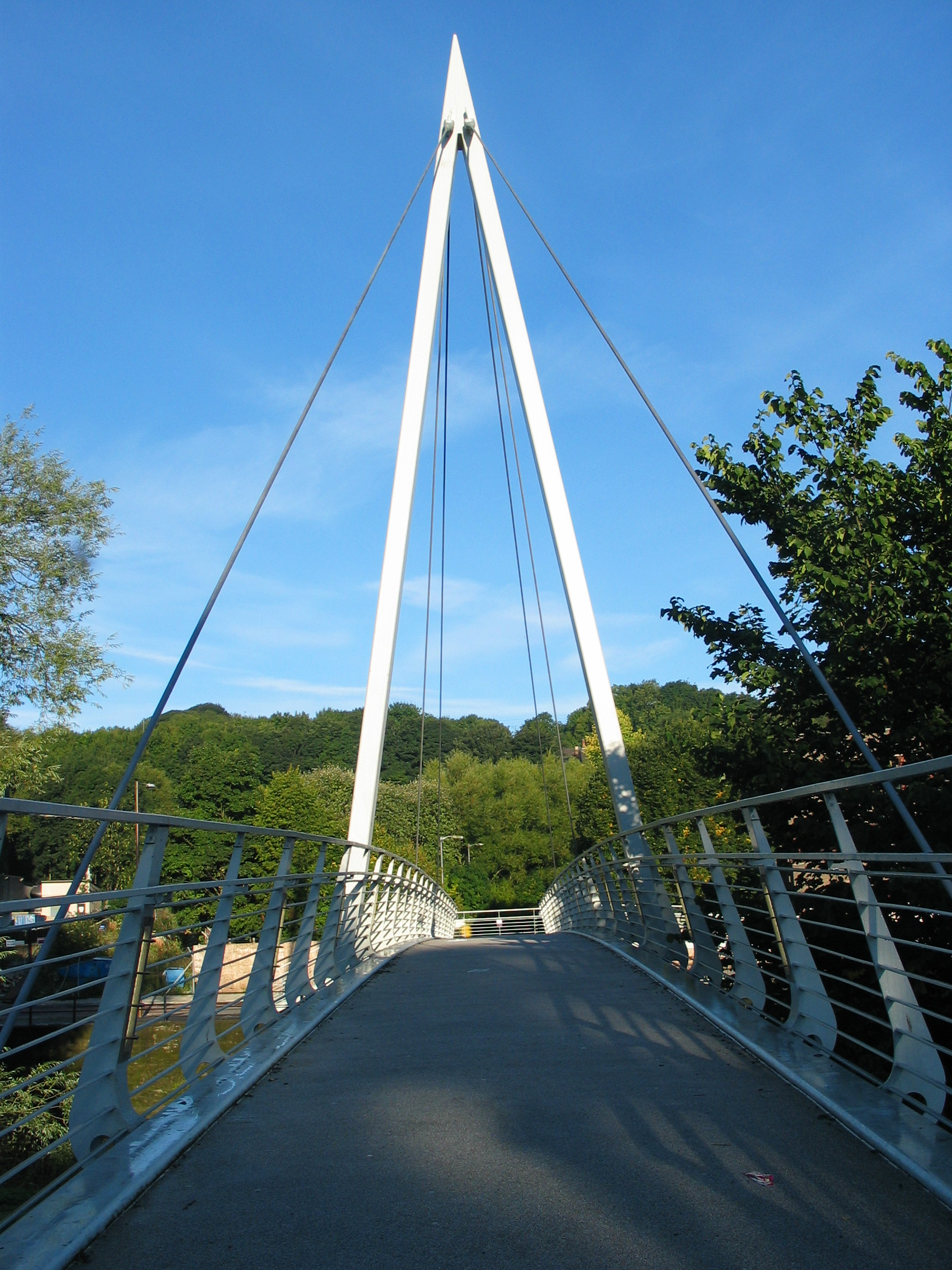
Pennyferry Bridge

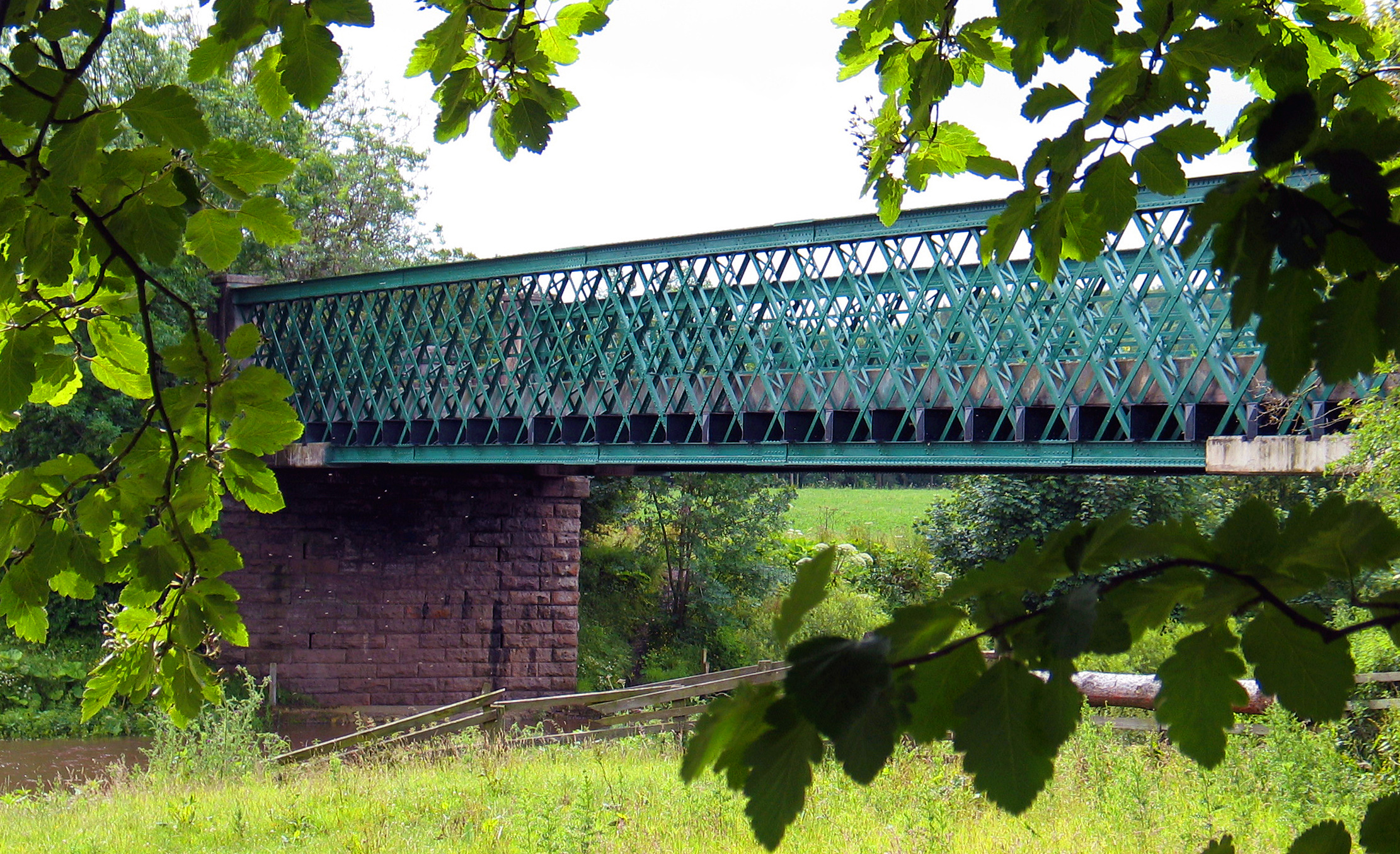
Cocken Bridge

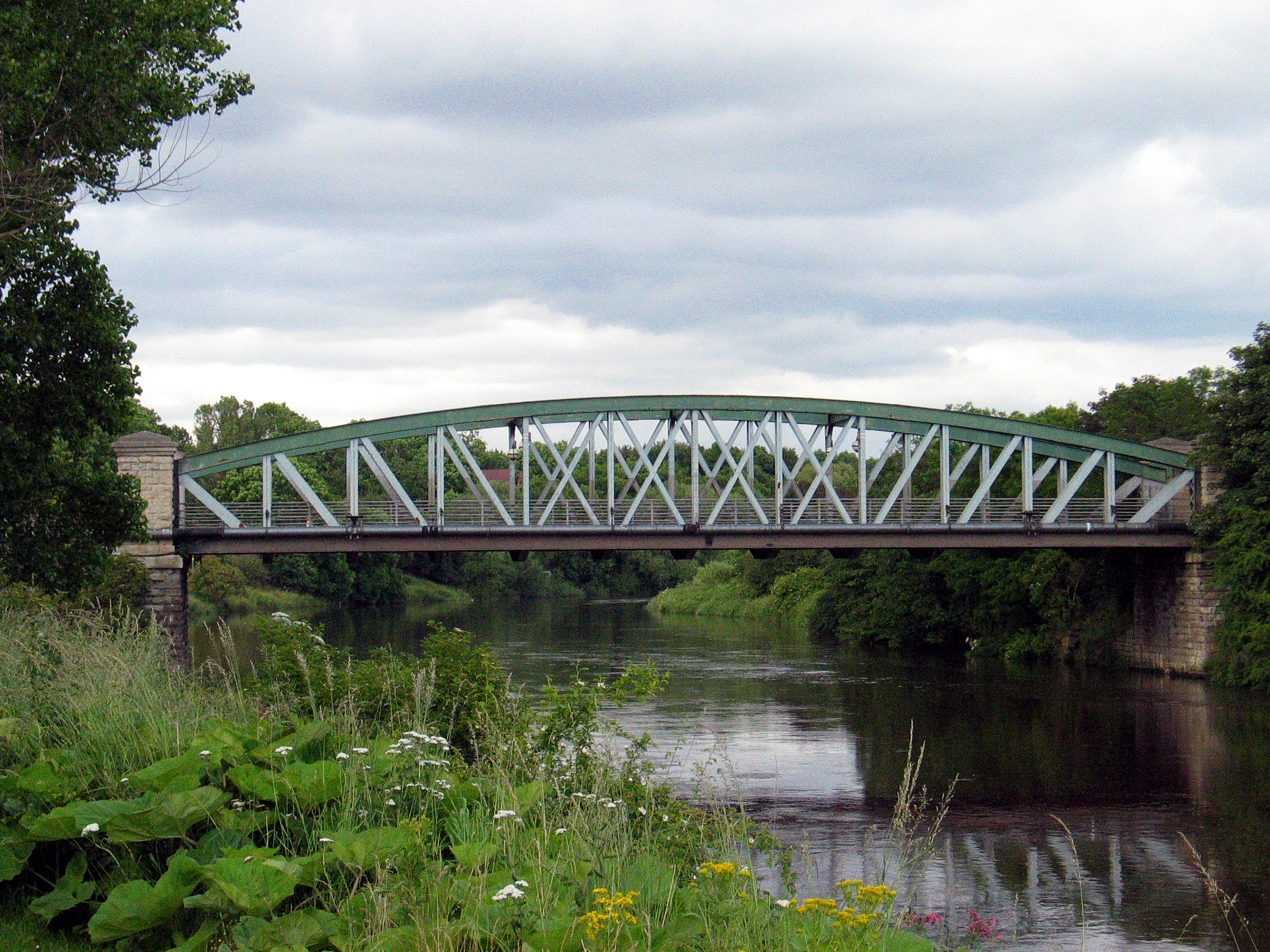
Fatfield Bridge

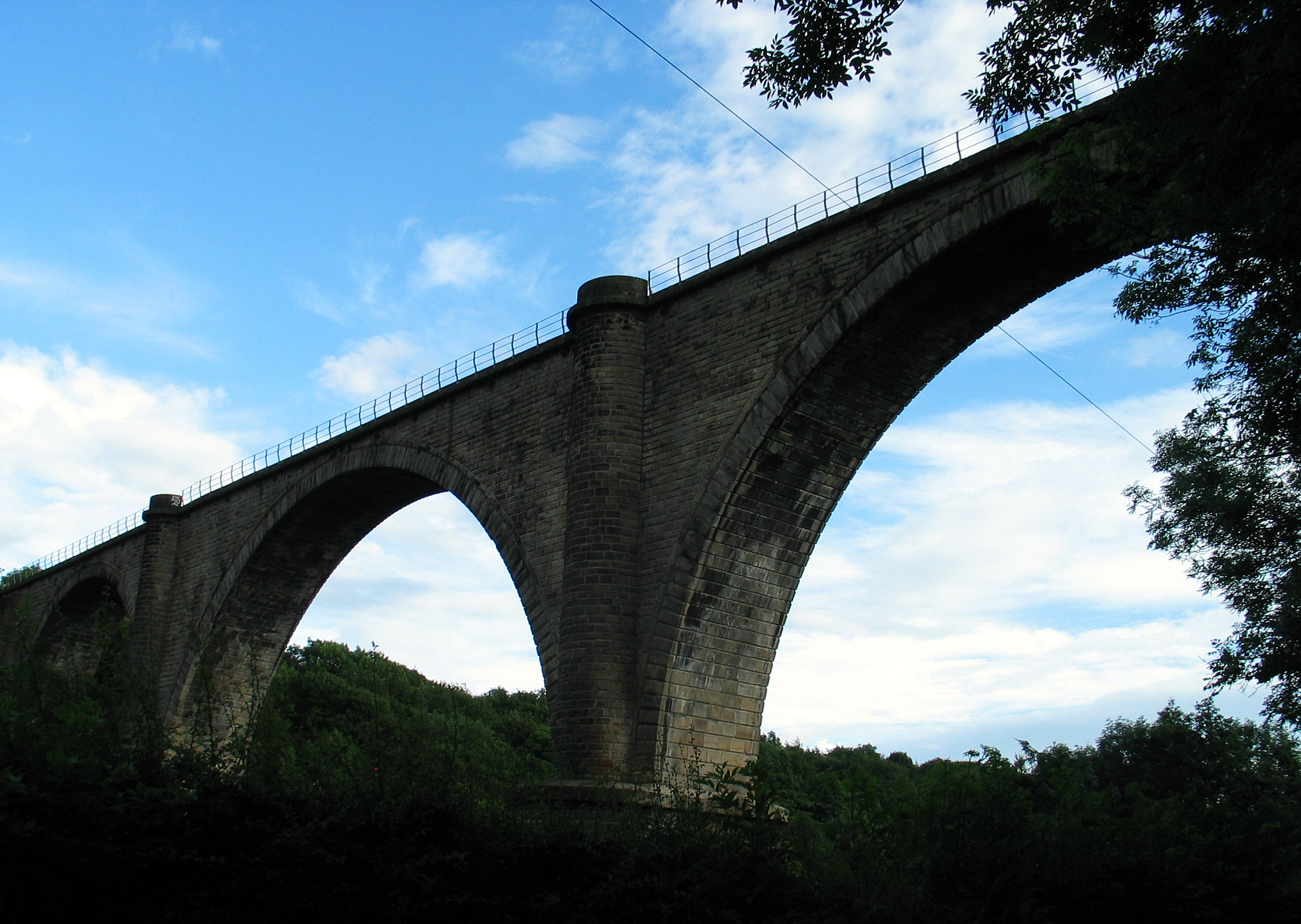
Victoria Viaduct

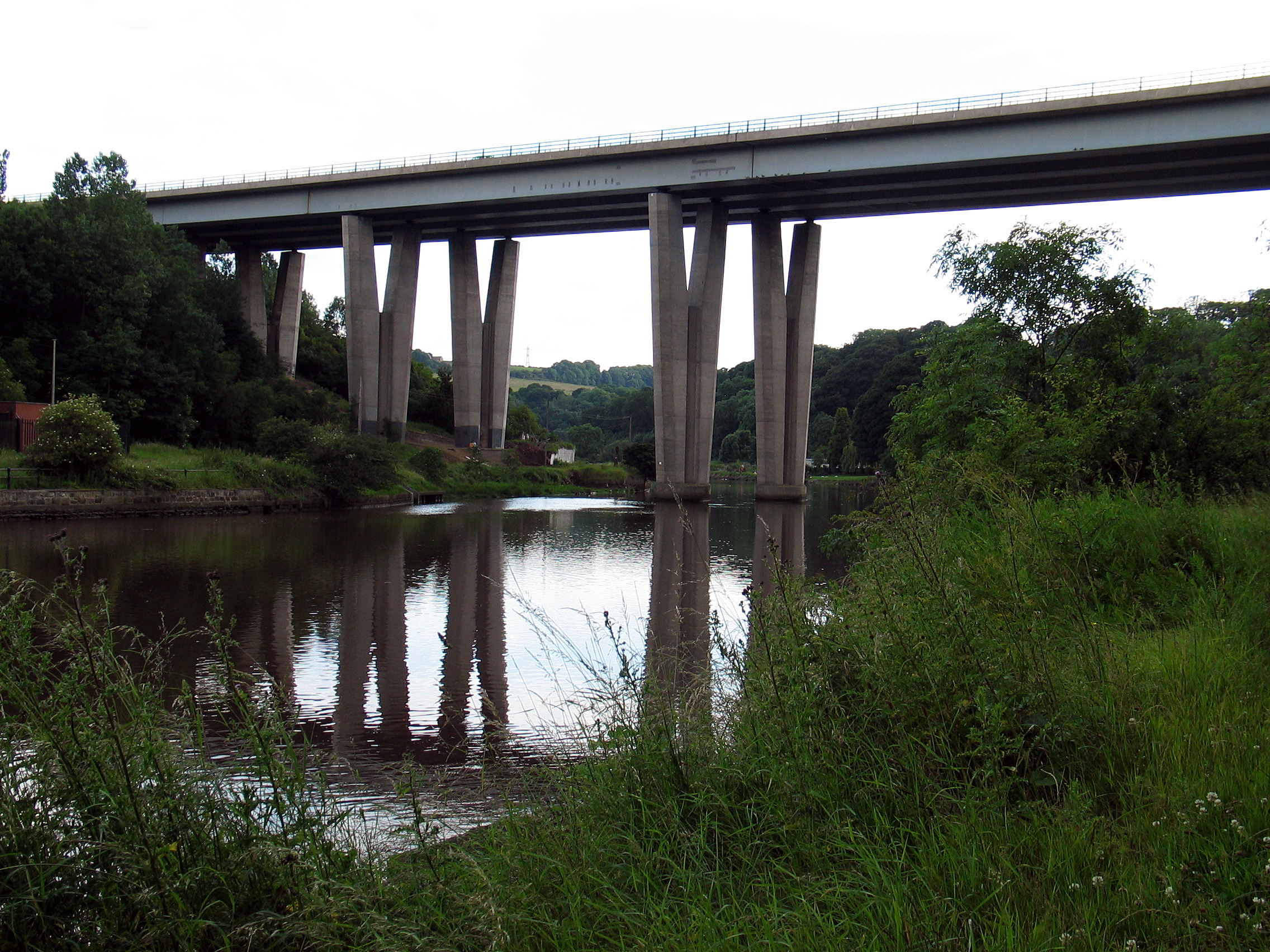
Hylton Viaduct

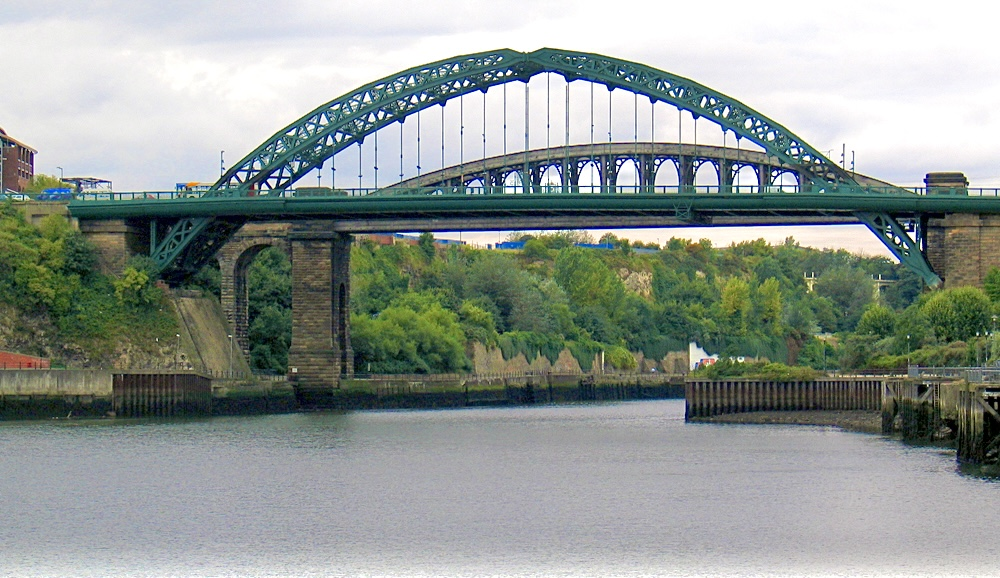
Wearmouth Bridge

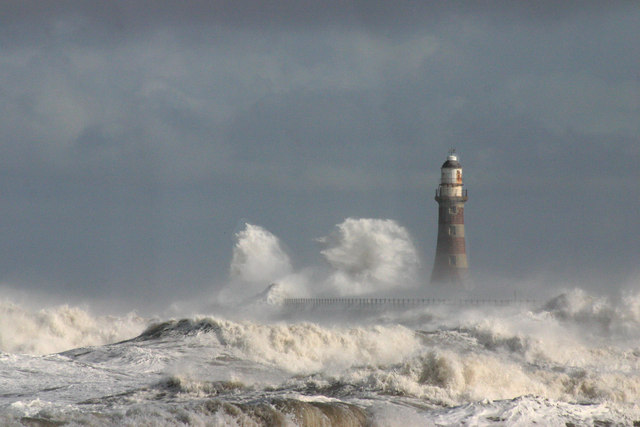
Roker Pier lighthouse, where the river meets the sea

== Notes and references ==
Notes

== Sources ==
- Natural Environment Research Council, Institute of Geological Sciences, 1971, "British Regional Geology: Northern England" Fourth Edition, HMSO, London.
- Johnson, G.A.L. & Hickling, G. (eds.), 1972, "Geology of Durham County", Transactions of the Natural History Society of Northumberland, Durham and Newcastle upon Tyne, Vol.41, No.1.
- 'Wear River', "Encyclopædia Britannica", 17th Edition, 1990.
