= Sunderland Bridge (village) =

Village in County Durham, England

Coordinates: 54°44′N 1°35′W

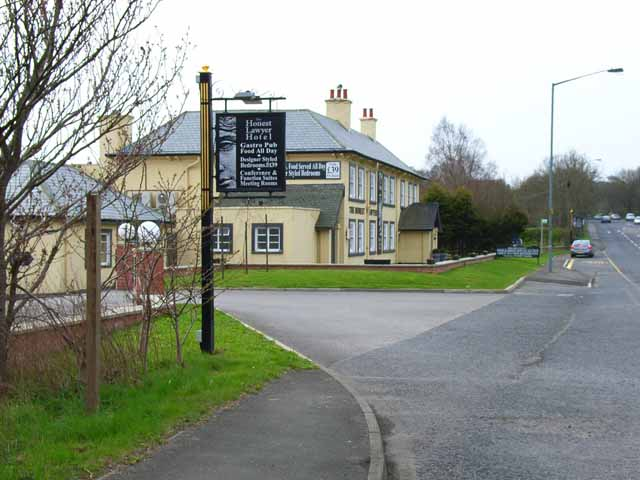
- The Honest Lawyer

- Location within County Durham
- Civil parish: Croxdale and Hett
- Unitary authority: County Durham
- Ceremonial county: Durham
- Region: North East
- Country: England
- Sovereign state: United Kingdom

Sunderland Bridge is a village and former civil parish, now in the parish of Croxdale and Hett, in the County Durham district, in the ceremonial county of Durham, England. It is about 3 miles (4.8 km) south of Durham city. In 1961 the parish had a population of 907.

The village takes its name from a grade I listed bridge just outside the village. Sunderland meaning sundered or separated land, in this case parish lands separated from the parish of St. Oswald's in Durham City, by the River Wear. The village is home to St. Bartholomew's Church, a Victorian church built between 1843 and 1846 (by George Pickering) and extended between 1876 and 1878 (by C.H. Fowler), with the addition of a new nave and chancel. The church was built to serve the new settlement of Croxdale Colliery which had rapidly developed less than half a mile south of the village to house workers for the new mine workings in the area (now simply known as Croxdale). The land for the church was given by the Salvin family of nearby Croxdale Hall in exchange for the old chapel on the Croxdale estate. The churchyard is the resting place of James Finlay Weir Johnston the founding father of Durham Johnston School in near by Durham.

== Governance ==
Sunderland Bridge was formerly a township in St. Oswald parish, from 1866 Sunderland Bridge was a civil parish in its own right until it was abolished on 1 April 1986 to form "Croxdale and Hett".
