= Hett, County Durham =

Village in County Durham, England

Coordinates: 54°43.4′N 1°33.8′W

Hett
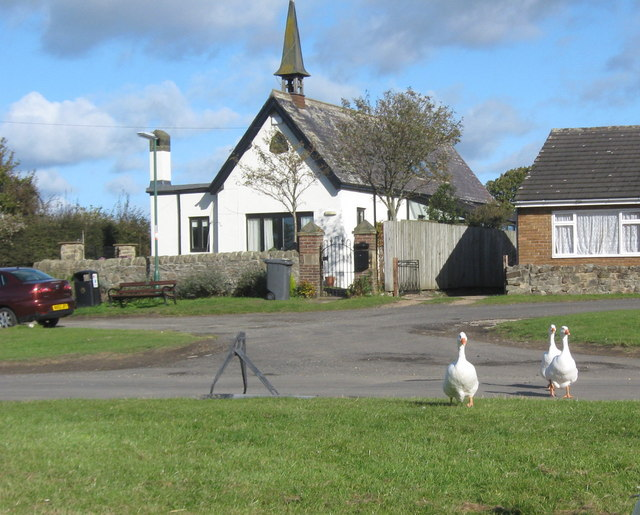

- Location within County Durham
- Civil parish: Croxdale and Hett
- Unitary authority: County Durham
- Ceremonial county: Durham
- Region: North East
- Country: England
- Sovereign state: United Kingdom

Hett is a village and former civil parish, now in the parish of Croxdale and Hett, in the County Durham district, in the ceremonial county of Durham, England. It is situated a few miles south of Durham. Hett is largely surrounded by farmland. To the south, rape fields are predominant while at the northern end, cattle are grazed all year round. To the north-west of Hett lies Sunderland Bridge, a small hamlet with a population of under 50 people (2004). Hett contains a small pond, village hall and a football pitch.

Hett gives its name to an igneous dyke which cuts through the local Coal Measures rocks. Hett is under the constituency of Newton Aycliffe and Spennymoor

== Etymology ==
The name Hett is of Old English origin. The name originates with the term hætt (> "a hat"), which topographically refers to a hill thought to resemble a hat.

== Civil parish ==
Hett was formerly a township in the parish of Kirk Merrington, from 1866 Hett was a civil parish in its own right, on 1 April 1986 the parish was abolished to form "Croxdale & Hett". In 1961 the parish had a population of 148.
