= Lewis Kennedy =

Lewis Kennedy may refer to:

- Lewis Kennedy (d. 1743), gardener to John Russell, 4th Duke of Bedford at Woburn Estate, Bedfordshire
- Lewis Kennedy (d. 1782), Scottish nurseryman, co-founder of Lee and Kennedy's Vineyard Nursery at Hammersmith, London
- Lewis Kennedy (landscape designer) (1789–1877), designer of formal gardens at estates in England and France
