= Croxdale =

English village

Coordinates: 54°43.7′N 1°34.9′W

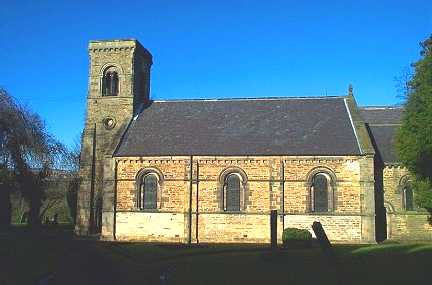
St Bartholomew's Church

Croxdale is a village in the civil parish of Croxdale and Hett, situated about 3 miles (4.8 km) south of Durham City, in County Durham, England and on the A167 road, formerly part of the Great North Road. It is on the route of the East Coast Main Line and at one time had a station. The railway crosses over Croxdale Viaduct, built in 1872, just north of the village. The Weardale Way long distance footpath passes through the nearby Croxdale Hall estate.

== History ==
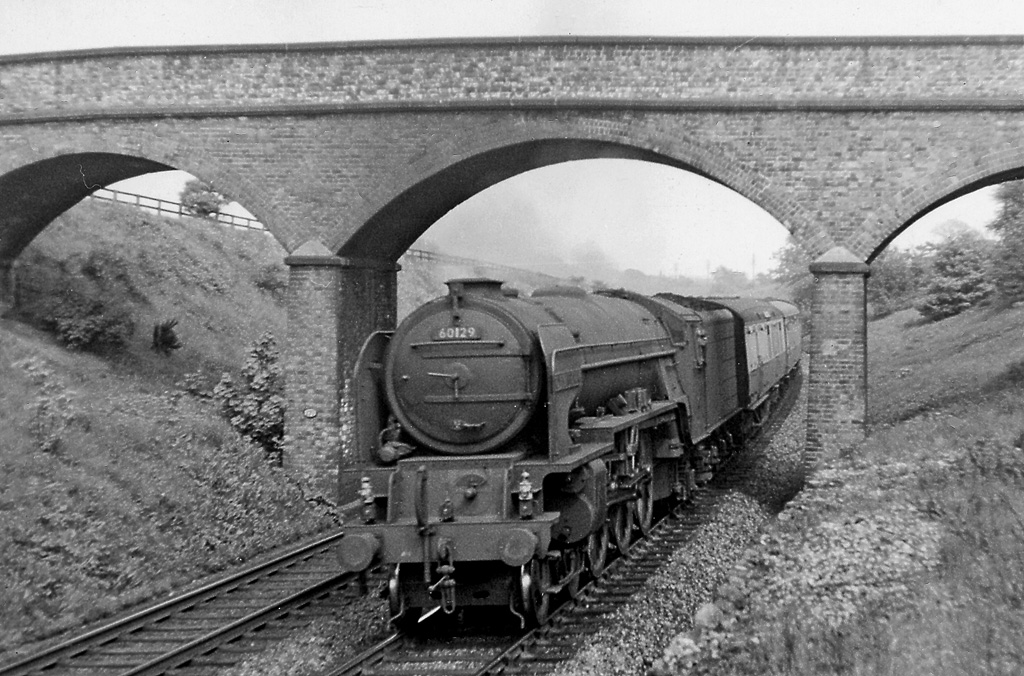
Historic picture of railway at Croxdale

The village originates from a small settlement around Croxdale Hall which is about half a mile to the north east of the modern village. First mentioned in records as Crokesteil in 1195 the name may come from a Viking named Krokr and the shape of the river bends that meander like a tail. Ownership of Croxdale dates back to 1291 when it was owned by a Roger Routhberi. By the 1350s ownership of Croxdale had passed to Robert de Whalton a treasurer of Brittany. De Whalton's granddaughter Agnes married a Gerard Salvin in 1409 and the Croxdale estates passed to the Salvin family who still own Croxdale Hall and the surrounding estate to this day. For centuries the owner of Croxdale Hall has gone by the name Gerard Salvin, the family were noted Roman Catholics and had to keep a low profile for centuries due to Catholic persecutions. The original or old Croxdale consists of Croxdale Hall and surrounding buildings which include a chapel, farm houses and hay barn. Most of these buildings are listed and can be easily seen by following the Weardale Way public footpath across the estate.

Located just to the north of Croxdale (to the left of the A167) is Burn Hall which was designed and built in 1821 by Durham architect Ignatius Bonomi for the Salvin family. The cost of owning and maintaining two grand halls proved prohibitive and it was sold in 1926 to Roman Catholic missionaries who used it to train boys as missionary priests. In 1995 it was sold again and became luxury apartments. Burn Hall has subsequently been restored to an 11 bedroom manor house.

The modern village of Croxdale exists because of coal mining coming to the area. Croxdale Pit was opened in 1845. This venture was carried out by the Salvin family of Croxdale Hall but lasted only a few decades, closing by 1870. At this time St. Bartholomew's church was built by Salvin for the miners who were attracted to work in the colliery. In exchange for the ancient chapel situated on the nearby Croxdale Estate, Gerard Salvin, Esq., gave the site of this church, the old chapel now being used as a mortuary chapel for the Salvin family. St. Bartholomew's churchyard is the final resting place of James Finlay Weir Johnston the founder of Durham Johnston School in nearby Durham City. 1875 saw a return of coal mining as the Weardale Iron and Coal Company opened Croxdale Colliery just to the south of Sunderland Bridge. This mine producing coal, fireclay and coke and employing, at its peak, over 900 workers. Housing was built to accommodate mine workers and their families, a Methodist chapel completed in 1877 and a school built in 1878-79 (now the community centre) as well as St. Bartholomew's being extended in 1878. The main streets in the new mining village were named after the people who provided the finance to build the housing, Salvin Street and Rogerson, Johnson and Foster Terraces. So successful was the colliery that John Rogerson (one of the four directors of the Weardale Iron and Coal Company) rented Croxdale Hall from the Salvin family for a time. The colliery closed in 1934.

Until 1938 Croxdale had a railway station served by the North Eastern Railway. The station itself no longer exists but the old station house, station hotel and railway workers cottages are now private homes on the main A167 road. Traces of the spur in the line for the colliery can still be seen in nearby fields.

During World War 2 the village was home to a munitions factory, after the war this became the NESS furniture factory. This closed in 2015. From 2017 the former factory was converted into a business hub with offices, service yards and storage and distribution facilities with planning permission to potentially add housing at a later date.

== Community ==
The village has a corner shop (formerly the village post office), two public houses: The Daleside, a traditional English style pub and The Croxdale Inn/Penash, an Indian restaurant and bar. There is a play park for the children of the village which was funded by a series of summer fun days. The village also has a football pitch and allotments.

The church built in 1845 and dedicated to St. Bartholomew was built in the Norman style. It consists of nave, chancel, and western tower and is situated at the western extremity of the village of Sunderland Bridge.

The community centre is in the old school hall. It hosts various clubs and acts as the polling station on election days.
