= James Finlay Weir Johnston =

Scottish agricultural chemist and mineralogist

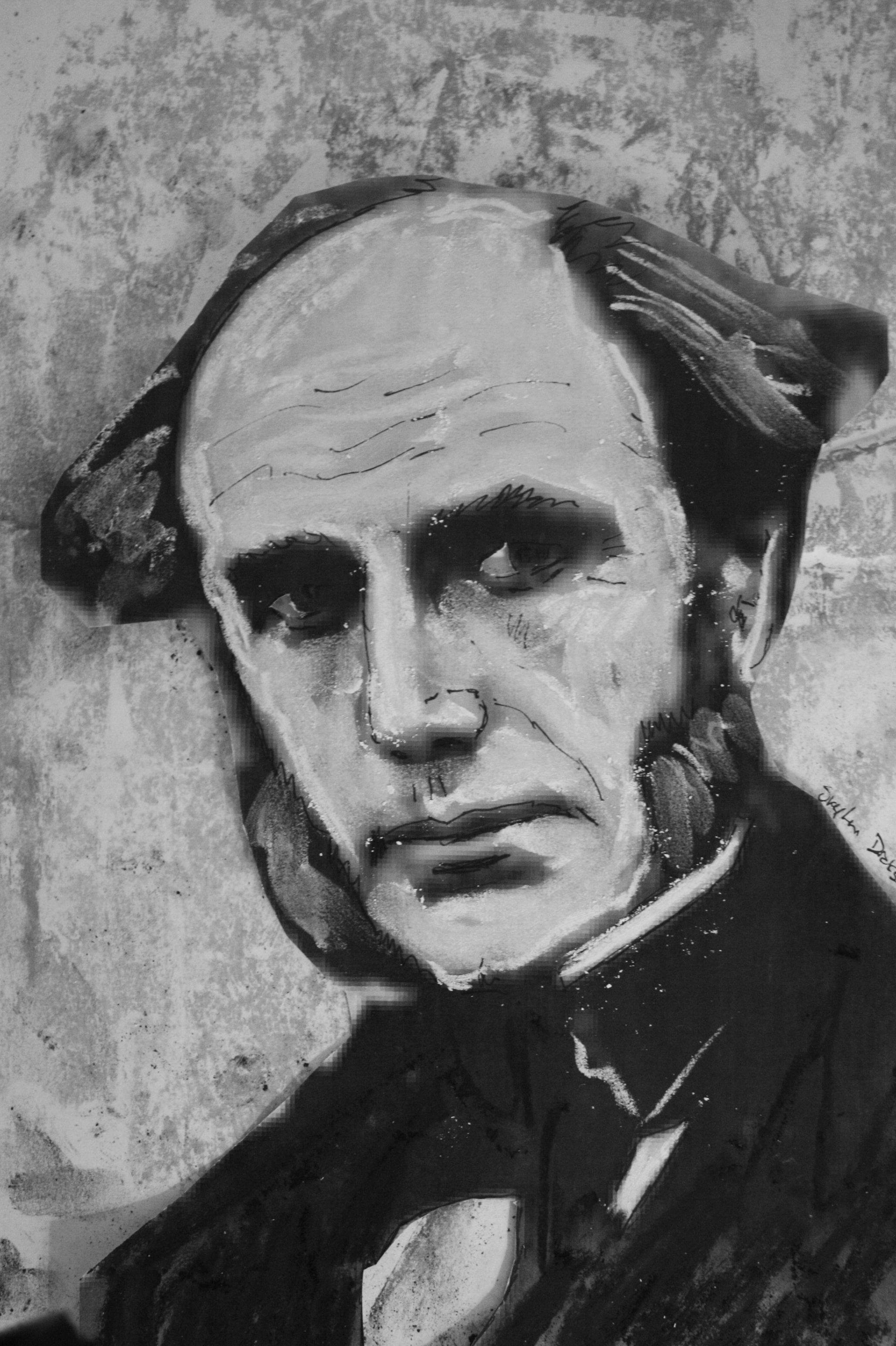
James F W Johnston

James Finlay Weir Johnston, FRS FRSE (13 September 1796 – 18 September 1855) was a Scottish agricultural chemist and mineralogist.

== Life ==
Born in Paisley, Renfrewshire, Johnston was educated at University of Glasgow, where he studied Theology and graduated MA.

Johnston founded a grammar school in Durham in 1825, which later merged with other local schools, such as Brandon and Bowburn, to form a single comprehensive school for the area, named Durham Johnston Comprehensive School, preserving James Finlay Weir Johnston's name.

He acquired a fortune at the time of his marriage in 1830, and was able to devote himself to studying chemistry. He visited the chemist J. J. Berzelius in Sweden and was a co-founder of the British Association for the Advancement of Science.

In 1832 he was elected a Fellow of the Royal Society of Edinburgh, his proposer being Thomas Charles Hope. He was elected a Fellow of the Royal Society of London in 1837.

He was appointed reader in Chemistry and Mineralogy at Durham University on its foundation in 1833, but continued to reside in Edinburgh out of term. From 1847, his assistant was Augustus Voelcker who also lectured in agricultural chemistry at Durham University.

In 1849 the Assembly of New Brunswick contracted Johnston to survey and report on potential development. In his Notes on North America, Johnston reported that the Provincial soils were more productive than those of New York or Ohio.

Johnston died in Durham on 18 September 1855. He is buried in the churchyard at St. Bartholomew's church in Sunderland Bridge near Croxdale. Choosing to be buried in a country churchyard rather than in Durham City to avoid polluting drinking water drawn from local springs in the city as his body decayed.

== Works ==
Johnston's works are available through Internet Archive:

- 1845: Catechism of Agricultural Chemistry and Geology
- 1851: Notes on North America: agricultural, economical and social, volume 1
- 1851: Notes on North America: agricultural, economical and social, volume 2
- 1855: Chemistry of Common Life, volume 1, first edition
- 1855: Chemistry of Common Life, volume 2, first edition

== Family ==
In 1830 he married the daughter of Thomas Ridley of Durham.
