= Croxdale and Hett =

Civil parish in County Durham, England

Coordinates: 54°43′38″N 1°34′29″W

Croxdale and Hett is a civil parish in County Durham, England. It is situated approximately four miles south of Durham. The population of the civil parish as taken at the 2011 census was 866.

The parish comprises the settlements of:

- Croxdale
- Hett
- Sunderland Bridge

For electoral purposes the parish is divided into two wards:

- Hett — covers the village of Hett and elects three parish councillors.
- Sunderland Bridge — covers the villages of Croxdale and Sunderland Bridge and elects six parish councillors.

== History ==
The parish was formed on 1 April 1986 from the parishes of Hett, Sunderland Bridge and part of Spennymoor.
