= Croxdale Estate =

Country house in County Durham, England

Coordinates: 54.73°N 1.57°W

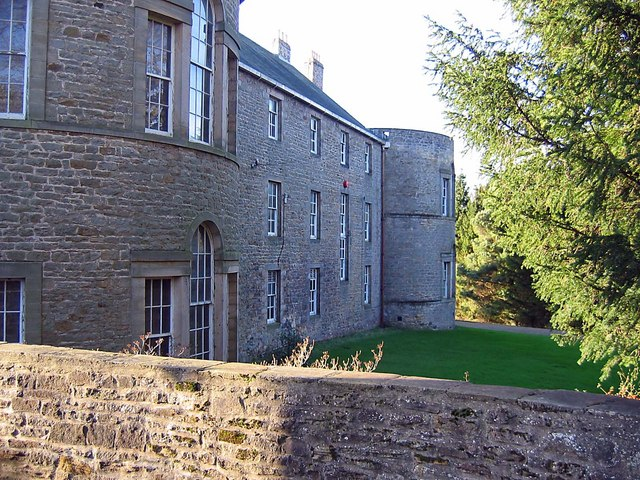
Croxdale Hall, County Durham

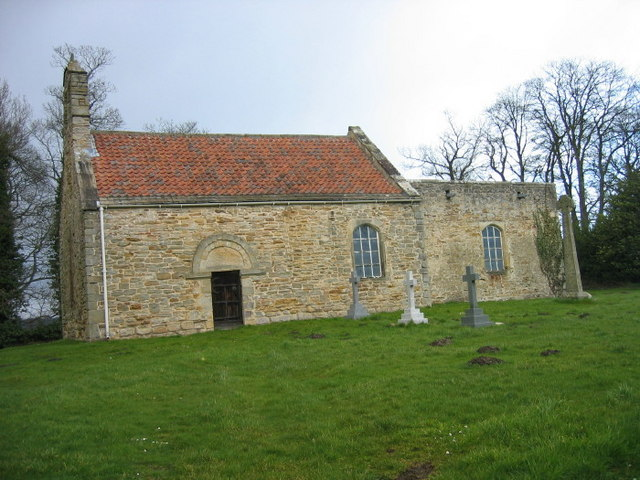
The 12th-century chapel at Croxdale Hall

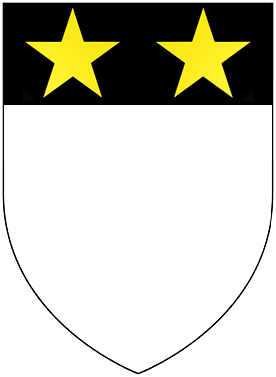
Arms of Salvin of Croxdale Hall, Durham: Argent, on a chief sable two mullets or

The Croxdale Hall Estate at Croxdale near Sunderland Bridge, County Durham, England, has been owned by the Salvin family since the 15th century. Its principal building is the Grade I listed Croxdale Hall.

== Ownership ==
The staunchly Roman Catholic Salvin family came to Croxdale by the marriage in 1402 of Gerard Salvin of Harswell, Yorkshire, to Agnes de Rissaby, heiress of Croxdale. They have held the property ever since. Records of the Salvin family are held by Durham County Record Office.

== Croxdale Hall ==
The house, originally in Tudor style, dates from the 17th century. Major alterations in about 1760 were carried out for William Salvin, probably to designs by architect John Carr, including the two-storey seven-bay west entrance front. The impressive internal Rococo plasterwork dates from this time.

A three-walled garden and lakes were laid out in the mid-18th century, creating a pleasure ground through which the family could demonstrate their wealth and status with the exotic plants they acquired through their gardener John Kennedy (1719–1790), his Hammersmith-based nurseryman brother Lewis Kennedy (1721–1782), and his business partner James Lee (1715–1795). The gardens have been listed at Grade II* on the National Register of Historic Parks and Gardens since 1993. As of 2024, they are on Historic England's Heritage at Risk Register regarding the condition of walls and water features.

Further alterations to the house by architect James Wyatt in about 1807 included the addition of a five-bay south wing and the insertion of a Gothic Revival-style Roman Catholic chapel into the 18th-century north wing.

The house served as a military hospital from 1940 to 1945 and then as a maternity home until at least 1954. It was designated as Grade I listed in 1967. More recently, the hall has been restored as a family home. It is open to the public by appointment.

== Other buildings ==
A disused 12th-century chapel which stands in the grounds is a Scheduled Ancient Monument and also a Grade I listed building. It was in use as a chapel of ease to St Oswalds, Elvet, until the new parish church of St. Bartholomew was built by the Salvins in 1845. Although it was repaired around 2021, as of 2024 the building is on the Heritage at Risk Register owing to "unresolved damp issues".

Also in the grounds is an 18th-century house (Grade II* listed) which housed the priests who served as chaplains to the Salvin family.
