= Lee and Kennedy =

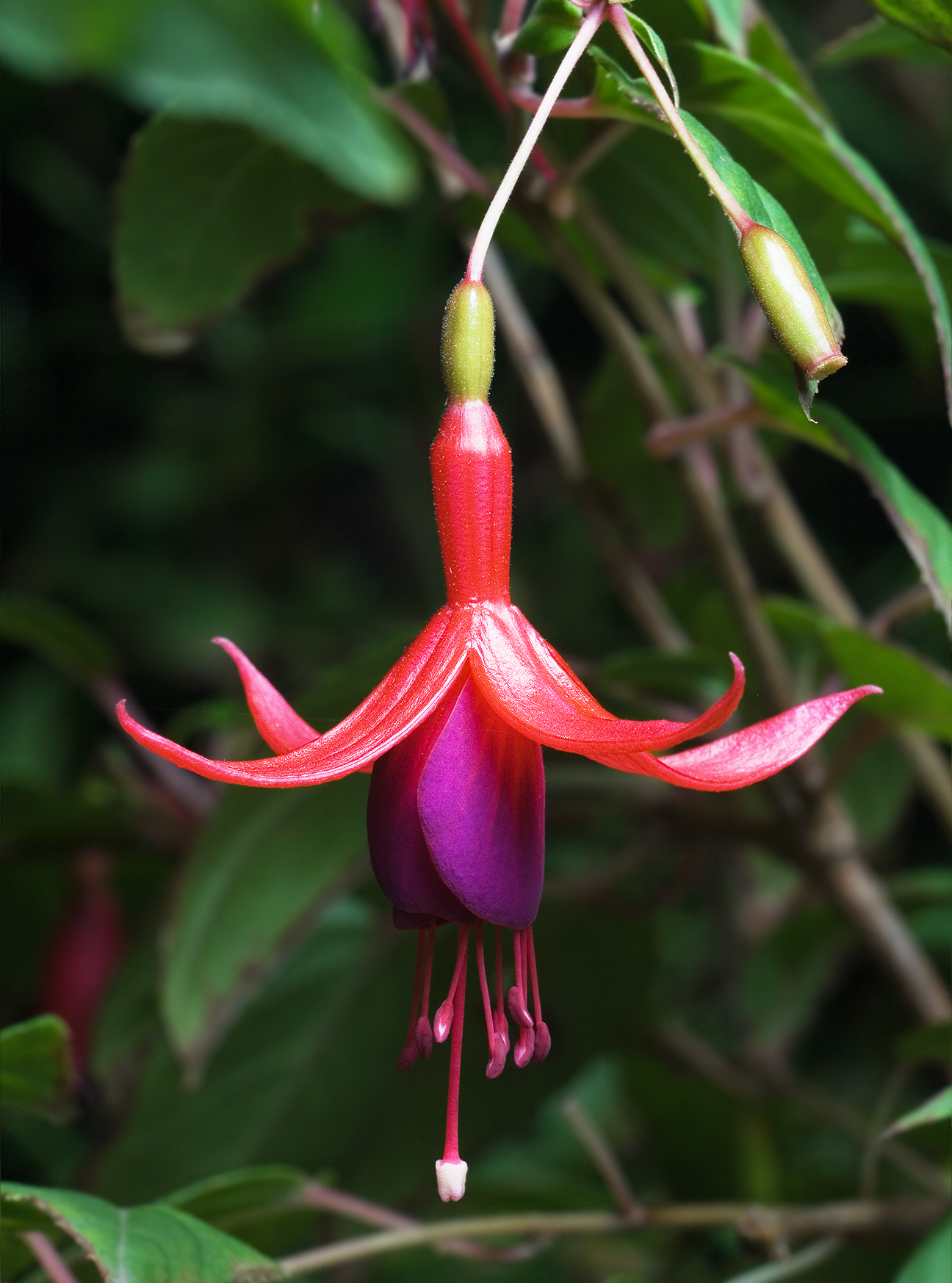
Fuchsia magellanica introduced to commerce by Lee and Kennedy in 1788 for one guinea a plant

Lee and Kennedy were two families of prominent Scottish nurserymen in partnership for three generations at the Vineyard Nursery in Hammersmith, west of London. "For many years," wrote John Claudius Loudon in 1854, "this nursery was deservedly considered the first in the world."

== Partnership in the Vineyard Nursery ==
Lewis Kennedy (b. Muthill, c.1721–1782) was gardener to Lord Wilmington at Chiswick, and had a nursery called "The Vineyard" at Hammersmith. At the beginning of the 18th century, according to Loudon, the vineyard formerly at this site produced annually "a considerable quantity of Burgundy wine."

In about 1745, Kennedy formed a partnership with James Lee (b. Selkirk, 1715–1795). Lee was a gardener who had apprenticed with Philip Miller at the Chelsea Physic Garden. He became gardener to the 7th Duke of Somerset at the nearby Syon House, and to Lord Islay, later the third Duke of Argyll, at Whitton Park. The Duke of Argyll, an enthusiastic gardener who imported large numbers of exotic species of plants and trees for his estate, "continued [Lee's] education and gave him the free use of his library."

== Notable introductions to commerce ==
Many tropical and sub-tropical plants for British greenhouses and hothouses were first introduced to commerce by Lee and Kennedy. The first China rose was imported by Lee and Kennedy, in 1787, and the next year the first fuchsia, as Fuchsia coccinea now known as F. magellanica, which Loudon remembered they had sold at first for a guinea a plant. In 1807 they introduced the dahlia to public cultivation. In 1818 they introduced the French idea of roses grown as standards.

== Botanical writing and scholarship ==
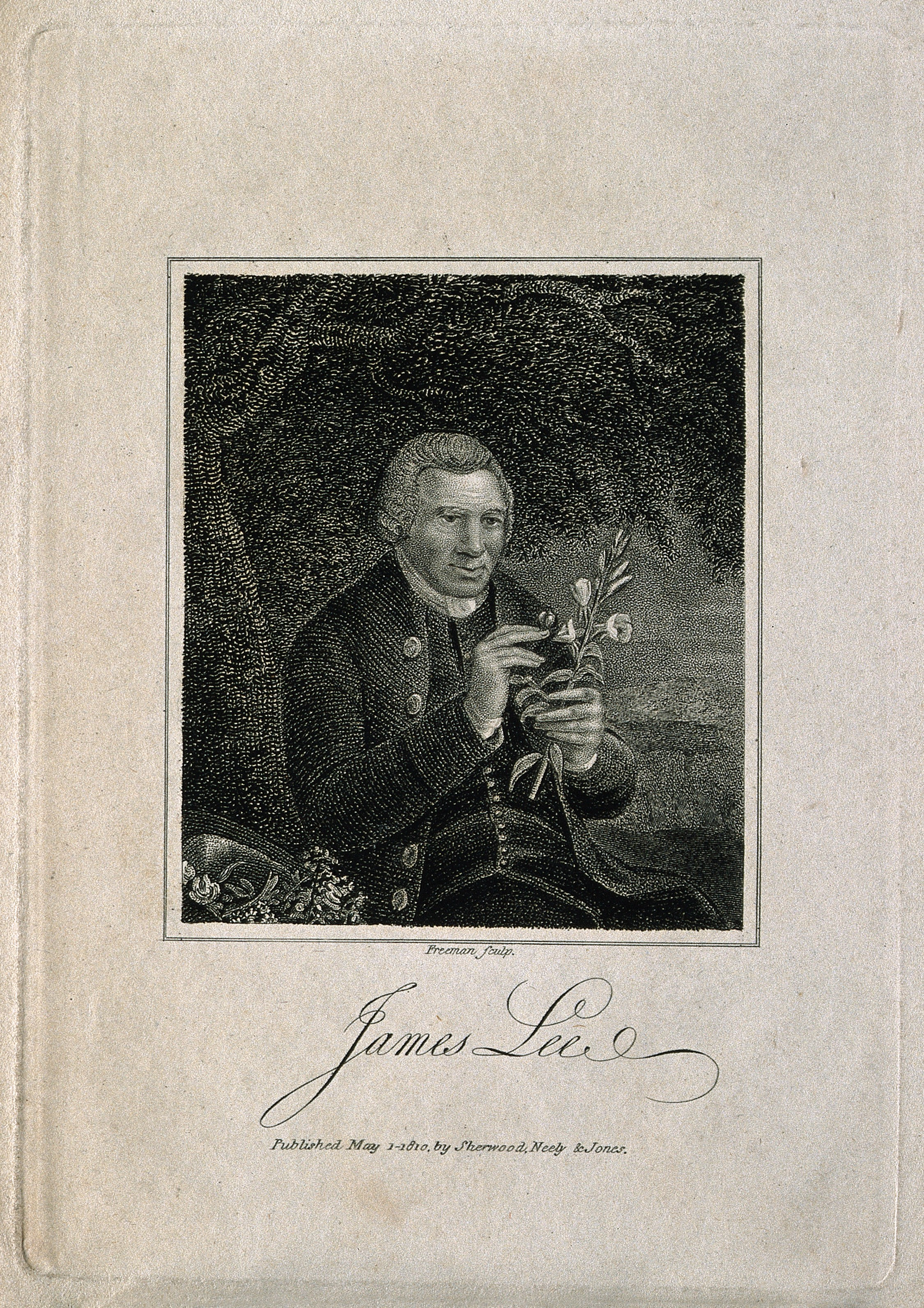
Portrait of James Lee. Credit: Wellcome Collection

James Lee was a correspondent with Carl Linnaeus, through Lee's connection with the Chelsea Physic Garden. He compiled an introduction to the Linnaean system, An Introduction to Botany, published in 1760, which passed through five editions.

In 1774 the partnership issued a Catalogue of plants and seeds: sold by Kennedy and Lee, nurserymen. The partners also kept their name prominently before English garden-owners by regularly providing material for botanical illustrations in Curtis's Botanical Magazine. In addition, they were in correspondence with plant collectors in the Americas and with Francis Masson and others at the Cape of Good Hope, from which hardy and half-hardy plants and seeds were coming to be tested in English gardens and hothouses.

Lewis Kennedy's son John Kennedy (b. Hammersmith, 8 October 1759, d. Eltham, 18 February 1842), raised in the family business, was a frequent contributor to the first five volumes (1799–1803) of the Henry Cranke Andrews publication The Botanist's Repository, for which he wrote most of the notes accompanying the illustrations, and contributed less frequently thereafter. Andrews was his son-in-law. John Kennedy also was the writer of Page's Prodromus, an 1817 scholarly work published under the name of another son-in-law, William Bridgwater Page.

== Notable clients ==
According to Étienne Pierre Ventenat, who named the Australian woody scrambler Kennedia to honor John Kennedy, the firm supplied roses for the Empress Josephine at Château de Malmaison during the lull in the Napoleonic Wars provided by the Peace of Amiens, 1802-03. Josephine's head gardener at Malmaison, Howatson, was English, but Alice M. Coats suggests that it was probably the well-established Scottish gardener and landscape designer, Thomas Blaikie, who put her in touch with Lee and Kennedy; her relation with a London-based firm was one of the curiosities of garden history, according to Coats. By 1803 the Empress had run up an outstanding bill with them of £2600. She helped them support a young plant hunter, James Niven (1776–1827), at the Cape of Good Hope, in expectation of sharing boxes of seeds and plants of never-before-seen rarities of the scarcely botanized Cape Province: heaths, ixias, pelargoniums and others. With the revival of war between France and Britain, John Kennedy had a special permit to come and go to the Continent, advising the Empress on the collection she was forming at Malmaison. There were setbacks: in 1804 she complained in a letter that shipments of seeds had been captured and detained; but in 1811 her expenditures with the firm again amounted to £700. At Malmaison, she installed a plant nursery, to ready her imports for distribution among French growers.

Towards the end of the Napoleonic Wars, Tsar Alexander I and three of his family visited England. Grand Duchess Catherine Pavlovna, young widow of the Duke of Oldenburg, made a point of visiting Lee and Kennedy's nursery grounds at Hammersmith, reputed to be a magnet for any garden-minded visitor.

Lewis Kennedy arranged for the appointment by Bryan Salvin of his brother John Kennedy (1719-90) as gardener on £30 a year plus accommodation at Croxdale Hall in County Durham. John worked there between 1748 and 1771, (before moving on to Parlington Hall) and from 1750 regularly ordered trees and plants from his brother's nursery for the three walled pleasure garden the Salvin family had him create.

== Retirement and succession ==
James Lee died in 1795, and was succeeded in the venture by his son, also named James Lee (1754–1824).

In 1818, Lewis Kennedy retired to Eltham, Kent, and his son John Kennedy continued in business with the younger James Lee under the established name.

The firm was carried on for a third generation by two sons of James Lee, John Lee (c.1805 — 20 January 1899) and Charles Lee (8 February 1808 — 2 September 1881). John Lee retired in 1877. From the end of the Napoleonic Wars, Lee and Kennedy had faced increasing competition, including Loddiges at Hackney, in the field of hardy new introductions of shrubs and trees. The nursery grounds at Hammersmith were built over, followed by those at Ealing as London spread westwards, and the firm's last nurseries were at Feltham.

Lewis Kennedy (1789–1877), son of John Kennedy and grandson of the nursery's founder, had worked in the family business as a young man at Château de Malmaison and at Navarre, in Normandy, for the Empress Josephine. Upon returning to England, he designed numerous gardens in the new, formal style, including gardens at Chiswick House. In 1818, he was engaged as factor to the Drummond-Burrel Estates in Perthshire. In 1828 he added responsibility as agent for the Willoughby de Eresby Estate at Grimsthorpe, Lincolnshire and the Gwydir Estate, now in Gwynedd, the ownership of all of which was linked by marriage. He was also commissioned by Arabella, Duchess of Dorset to design a lakeside walk of shrubs and ornamental trees, complete with a boathouse, at Buckhurst Park, Sussex. He retired in 1868, by which time the estates for which he was responsible had been brought into prosperous order. Among his legacies is the formal flower garden at Drummond Castle, for which he worked on the scheme with the architect and landscape designer Sir Charles Barry.
