= Weardale Way =

Long-distance footpath in north east England

Coordinates: 54.917°N 1.365°W

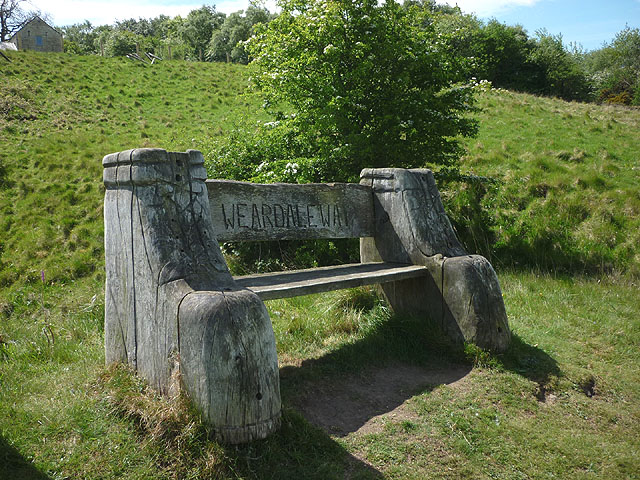
Wooden bench on the Weardale Way

Weardale Way is a footpath that follows the River Wear in the North East of England. It is 73 miles long, starting at the Lindisfarne Memorial on the sea wall at Roker (a part of the City of Sunderland). It then passes through Chester-le-Street, Durham, Bishop Auckland, Wolsingham and Stanhope. The path ends outside the Post Office in the village of Wearhead in County Durham.

Within the area administered by the City of Sunderland local authority, the route is meant to follow that marked as the River Wear Trail; unfortunately, many of the markers for this route have been removed by vandals. Once the route goes into the area administered by the Durham County Council, it is waymarked to some extent by plastic disks attached to wooden and metal posts, trees and street furniture. There are several wooden 'finger' signs along the route that countdown the distance along the footpath in both directions.

This path is marked on the latest series of Ordnance Survey 1:25,000 maps, Explorer sheets 305, 307, 308 and OL31 cover the walk.

The most recently published guide to the walk was the 2021 Weardale Way Pocket Guide, though as of October 2026 it is out of print. The Durham Cow website keeps an updated guide to the walk.

== Points of interest on or near the route ==
- Roker Pier
- Penshaw Monument
- Lumley Castle
- Chester-le-Street Riverside Cricket Ground
- Finchale Priory
- Durham Cathedral
- Durham Castle
- Croxdale Hall
- Kynren
- Auckland Castle
- Escomb Church
- Witton Castle
- Weardale Railway
- Remnants of several lead and fluorspar quarries and mines
- Killhope Mining Museum

== See also ==
- Long-distance footpaths in the UK
