= Sunderland Bridge, County Durham =

Bridge in County Durham, England

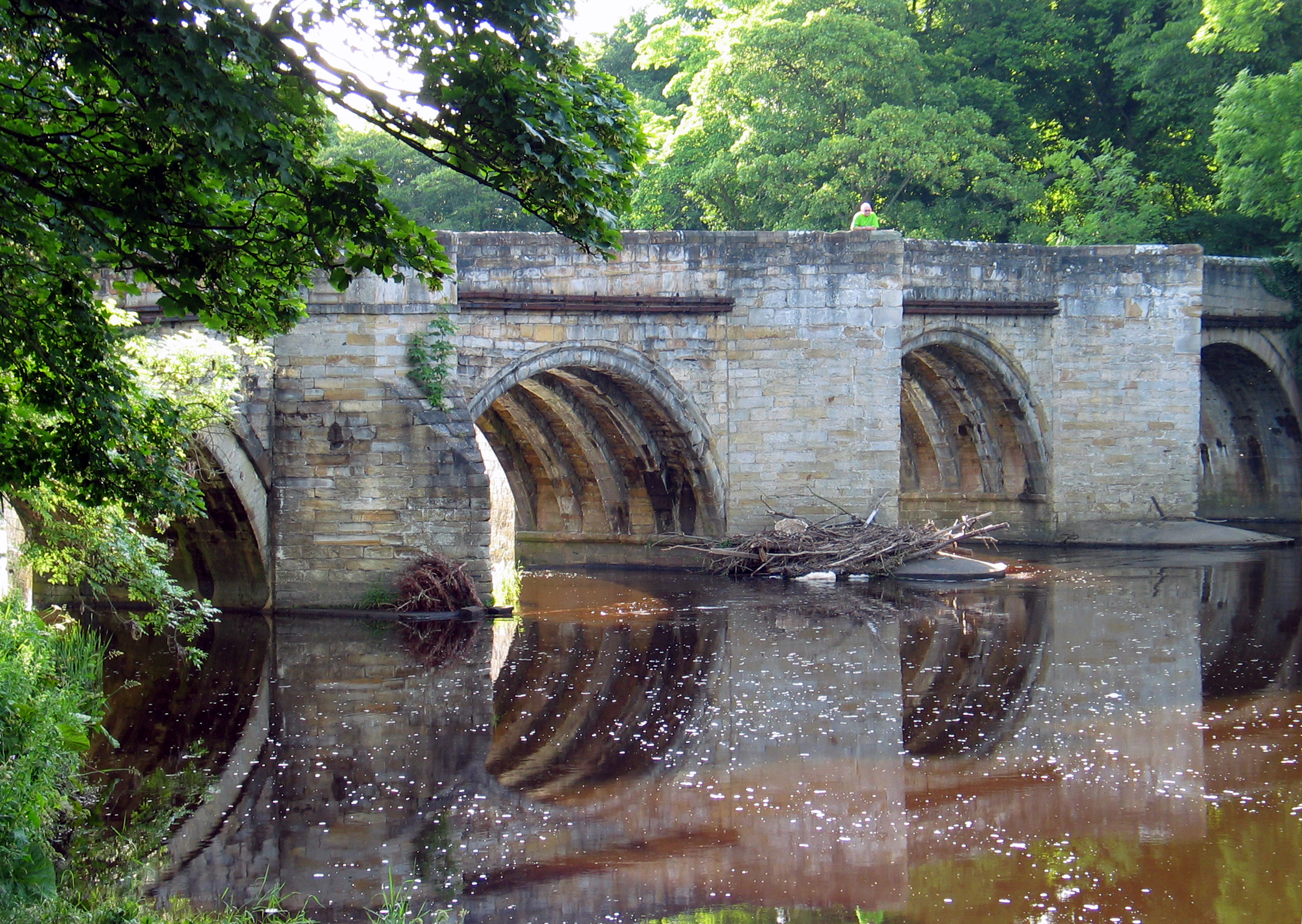
- Coordinates: 54°44′03″N 1°35′23″W
- OS grid reference: NZ 265 378
- Carries: Weardale Way
- Crosses: River Wear
- Locale: Sunderland Bridge
- Heritage status: Grade I listed building, scheduled monument
- Next upstream: Croxdale Viaduct
- Next downstream: Croxdale Road Bridge

Characteristics
- Width: 18 ft (5.5 m)
- No. of spans: 4

History
- Opened: 14th century

Sunderland Bridge is a bridge just outside the village also called Sunderland Bridge in County Durham, England. It crosses the River Wear close to its confluence with the River Browney.

Sunderland Bridge originally carried the Great North Road (A1) across the River Wear, and probably dates back to the 14th century. It is built of dressed sandstone with four semicircular arches. The bridge has undergone several rebuilds, with the end arches being rebuilt in 1770, the parapets widened in 1822, and new end walls built in the 19th century. It is a Grade I listed structure.

When a new bridge was needed as the existing bridge was not wide enough to cope with traffic, Croxdale Bridge was constructed to the east of the existing bridge. The A1 at this point was later re-designated as the A167, and Croxdale Bridge continues to carry this road.

Sunderland Bridge now carries very little road traffic after Durham County Council closed off the old route of the Great North Road at local request. It allows access to the private Croxdale estate and a sewage works. The bridge also forms part of the Weardale Way long-distance footpath. The bridge straddles the parishes of Brandon and Byshottles and Croxdale and Hett.

Next bridge upstream	River Wear	Next bridge downstream
Croxdale Viaduct	Sunderland Bridge, County Durham; Grid reference NZ 265 378	Croxdale Road Bridge
