= Urban planner =

Professional who practices in the field of urban planning

Occupation
- Names: City planner, town planner, urban planning engineer, urban planner, rural planner, city planning engineer
- Occupation type: Profession
- Activity sectors: Urban planning; Civil engineering; Geography; Public administration; Real estate development; Landscape architecture

Description
- Competencies: Critical thinking, analytical thinking, problem-solving, communicating effectively, working with social, political, business-oriented commercial, economic, cultural, and environmental issues
- Education required: See urban planning education
- Fields of employment: Construction, building & planning, public administration
- Related jobs: Civil engineer, architect, geographer, historian/preservationist, landscape engineer, landscape architect, quantity surveyor, urban designer, municipal administrator, public administrator

An urban planner is a professional who practices in the field of urban planning. An urban planner may focus on a specific area of practice and have a title such as city planner, town planner, regional planner, long-range planner, transportation planner, infrastructure planner, environmental planner, parks planner, physical planner, health planner, planning analyst, urban designer, community development director, economic development specialist, or other similar combinations.

The Royal Town Planning Institute is the oldest professional body of town and urban planners founded in 1914 and the University of Liverpool established the first dedicated planning school in the world in 1909, followed by Harvard University in 1924. There also exists evidence of urban planners in ancient cities in Egypt, China, India, and the Mediterranean world. For instance, Hippodamus has often been credited the title of "the father of city planning" in Aristotle's Book 2.

== Education and training ==
Urban Planning as a profession is a relatively young discipline. Urban Planning is an interdisciplinary field closely related to civil engineering. Few government agencies restrict or license the profession. As a result, a number of other related disciplines actively claim to have the training, expertise and professional scope to practise urban planning. While organizations such as the American Planning Association, the Canadian Institute of Planners and the Royal Town Planning Institute certify professional planners, others in related fields like Landscape Architecture also claim to have professional autonomy in urban planning. Efforts internationally have attempted to define the role of urban planners through licensure acts. The US State of New Jersey and the Canadian province of Nova Scotia license Professional Planners. All Canadian provinces and territories except Newfoundland and Labrador and Quebec restrict the use of the term 'Registered Professional Planner' to licensed urban planners. In Quebec, urban planners must be licensed by the l'Ordre des Urbaniste du Quebec.

== Urban planners by country ==
=== Canada ===
Urban planners in Canada usually hold bachelor's degrees in planning or a master's degree, typically accredited as an M.Pl. (Master of Planning), MUP (Master of Urban Planning) MCP (Master of City Planning), MSc.Pl. (Master of Science in Planning), M.Pl.(Master of Urban and Regional Planning), MES (Master of Environmental Studies) or simply an MA (Master of Arts).

Professional certification is offered by the Canadian Institute of Planners and its provincial and territorial affiliates. The Institute accredits planning education programs, and sets standards for entry into the profession. Each provincial or territorial body is responsible for licensing and regulating members within its borders. Provincial and territorial affiliates may allow certified members to use the title of Registered Professional Planner (RPP).

=== Greece ===
Urban planners in Greece typically graduate from Engineering faculties. Aristotle University of Thessaloniki and University of Thessaly are the two universities that provide undergraduate studies in urban planning in Greece.

=== Hong Kong ===
The Hong Kong Institute of Planners is the statutory corporation in Hong Kong regulating professional town planners' accreditation and development. Full members of the institute are eligible to register as a Registered Professional Planner through Planners Registration Board in Hong Kong.

=== India ===
Though planning is not a recognized profession under Indian law, the profession began in 1941 in Delhi College of Engineering (now the Delhi Technological University). It was later integrated with the School of Town and Country Planning which was established in 1955 by the Government of India to provide facilities for rural, urban and regional planning. On integration, the school was renamed as School of Planning and Architecture in 1959. Today, it is one of the premier schools of pursuing planning studies at bachelor, masters and post doctorate levels.

The Institute of Town Planners, India (ITPI), set up on the lines of the Royal Town Planning Institute in London is the body representing planning professionals in India. A small group formed itself into an Indian Board of Town Planners which after three years of continuous work formed the ITPI. The institute, which was established in July 1951, today, has a membership of over 2800, apart from a sizable number of student members, many of whom have qualified Associateship Examination (AITP) conducted by ITPI. As of 2012, the institute has 21 regional chapters across India. School of Planning and Architecture (SPA), Delhi is one of the premier institutes in dissemination knowledge of Architecture and Planning in India. It was established in 1941. In 1979, the Government of India, through the then Ministry of Education and Culture, conferred on the School of Planning and Architecture the status of "Deemed to be a University"(http://spa.ac.in/Home.aspx?ReturnUrl=%2f) School of Planning and Architecture-Bhopal (M.P.) and School of Planning and Architecture-Vijayawada established in year 2008 by Ministry of Human Resource Development, Government of India. Centre for Environment Planning and Technology (CEPT) University in Ahmedabad and Malaviya National Institute of Technology (NIT) Jaipur, Maulana Azad National Institute of Technology (N.I.T) in Bhopal along with NIT Patna and State Universities like IGDTUW, Delhi are one of the pioneering Institutes in India where urban planning is taught. Post-graduation such as Master of engineering, Master of technology are also available in India.

=== Israel ===
The Israel Planners Association was founded in 1965. Urban planning is taught by two institutions. the Technion Faculty of Architecture and Urban Planning in Haifa and the Center for Urban and Regional Studies. The second institution is The Hebrew University of Jerusalem qualifying a Graduate Degree (M.A.) in Geography and Urban and Regional Planning.

=== Italy ===
The role of urban planners has a long-standing tradition in Italy. The exclusive skills of this profession were originally attributed to engineers and architects, as established by law and related implementing regulation. Later, in 1992, agronomists and foresters were also granted prerogatives related to territorial and urban planning. Since 2001, following the implementation of the reform of university regulations and professional orders (DPR 328/2001), the skills of territorial planners and urban planners have been the exclusive competence of territorial planners enrolled in the Order of Architects, Planners, and Landscapers - Section A. Additionally, agronomists and foresters enrolled in the Order of Agronomists and Foresters - Section A are also eligible for this role. This is without prejudice to the skills previously acquired by civil engineers and architects enrolled in the Order prior to the DPR 328/2001 reform.

Following the introduction of three-year degrees (Lauree Triennali) in Territorial Planning, graduates were included in the Order of Architects, Planners, Landscape Architects, and Conservators in the Planners Sector, Section B, with the professional title of "Junior Planner" (Pianificatore Iunior).

=== Malaysia ===
In Malaysia, urban planners typically hold a bachelor's degree or master's degree in planning. Several universities in Malaysia, such as Universiti Teknologi Malaysia (UTM), Universiti Malaya (UM), Universiti Teknologi MARA (UiTM), International Islamic University Malaysia (UIAM) and Universiti Sains Malaysia (USM) offer programs in urban and regional planning at both the undergraduate and postgraduate levels. In addition, there are also colleges that offer diploma and certificate courses in urban planning. These educational institutions provide students with the knowledge and skills necessary to pursue careers in the field of urban planning.

Professional certification is available through the Malaysian Institute of Planners (MIP) and its state-level affiliates. The Institute accredits planning education programs and establishes standards for entry into the profession. Each state-level body is responsible for licensing and regulating members within its jurisdiction. State-level affiliates may allow certified members to use the title of Registered Town Planner (RTP).

=== Mexico ===
Urban planners in Mexico typically graduate from an Architecture background provided by major universities in the country. Most of such degrees can be awarded at Masters' graduate studies, although there are also bachelor's degrees available.

=== New Zealand ===
A planner brings professional expertise and knowledge to the development and implementation of policy in the interests of productive, liveable and sustainable environments. Planners support communities and provide leadership in making informed choices about the consequences of human actions and in bridging the gap between the present and the future. Planners must consider and balance a range of strategic, policy, technical, legal, administrative, community and environmental factors in their contributions to informed decision-making.

Planners are employed in diverse public and private roles. They use their knowledge and experience in various institutional and community settings to provide leadership, undertake research, solve problems, evaluate alternatives and outcomes, manage change, and envision, advise on and enact desirable future directions.

In applying their expertise, planners must be aware of and responsive to cultural, social, economic, environmental, ethical and political values. In New Zealand, these include the bicultural mandate for planning, including the partnership relationships established by the Treaty of Waitangi/te Tiriti o Waitangi, and New Zealand's increasingly multicultural society.

A key attribute of a planner is the ability to work across disciplinary and institutional boundaries and to integrate knowledge from a range of disciplines within the distinctive framework of the discipline of planning.

A professional planner is someone who has gained a professional qualification through tertiary study, continues to learn post qualification, undertakes continuing professional development, is a member or is working towards becoming a member of the New Zealand Planning Institute (NZPI), contributes to the planning profession, and is committed to upholding the principles and ethical practices of the planning profession.

=== Nigeria ===
In Nigeria, the Nigerian Institute of Town Planners (NITP) and the Town Planners Registration Council (TOPREC) are the leading bodies tasked with the responsibility of improving the training, education and professional practice of planning in Nigeria.

To be a town planner in Nigeria, one must first complete a degree in Urban and Regional Planning or in a relevant discipline and then complete a final year in the form of a Masters in Urban and Regional Planning which must be accredited by the Town Planners Registration Council (TOPREC ), or a four-year degree encapsulating all aspects. One can then become eligible to be a member of the Nigerian Institute of Town Planners (NITP), but must first complete two years work-based training, to be a full member, and subsequently register and sit for the TOPREC professional examination, to become a registered town planner.

=== Palestine ===
Planners in Palestine took responsibility after the Palestinian Authority took governance in the West Bank and Gaza- Palestine. Planners have been trained by a Norwegian consultants As Plan Viak at the very beginning as part of the institutional capacity training project funded by the Norwegian Government. Both Birzeit and Alanjah Universities run bachelor's and master's degree in planning and planners could specialize in different fields.

=== South Africa ===
The South African Council for Planners (SACPLAN) is the statutory Council of nominated members appointed in terms of the Planning Profession Act, 2002 (Act 36 of 2002) by the Minister of Rural Development and Land Reform (Department of Rural Development and Land Reform) to regulate the Planning Profession(Planning is both the organizational process of creating and maintaining a plan) in terms of the Act. The Planning Profession Principles applies to all registered planners. The SACPLAN through the Act assures quality in the planning profession through the identification of planning profession work that only registered planners can undertake. The functions of the SACPLAN are contained in Section 7 of the Act. The powers and duties of the SACPLAN are contained in Section 8 of the Act. The Act further prescribes a Professional Code of Conduct for registered planners

=== United Kingdom ===
Those wishing to be a town planner, in the United Kingdom, first must complete a degree in a relevant discipline and then complete a final year in the form of a masters in town and country planning which must be accredited by the Royal Town Planning Institute (RTPI), or a four-year degree encapsulating all aspects. They can then become eligible to be a member of the RTPI, but must first complete two years work based training, to be a full, chartered member.

Town planners in the UK are responsible for all aspects of the built environment, wherever you are within the UK a town planner will have at sometime planned the built aspects of the environment. Local planning authorities grant planning permission to individuals, private builders and corporations, and employed officers of these authorities (which usually is a specific council for an area) involved in the decision-making process are referred to as planning officers (though those employed with a specialisation may have a different role title, such as conservation officer or landscape officer).

=== United States ===
Planners in the U.S. typically complete an undergraduate or graduate degree from a university offering the program of study. Professional certification is only offered through the American Institute of Certified Planners (AICP), a branch of the American Planning Association. To gain AICP certification, a planner must meet specific educational and experience requirements, as well as pass an exam covering the nature and practice of the discipline. Although AICP certification is not required to be a practicing planner, it does serve as a means in which a planner can verify his or her professional expertise. Although most states do not require any sort of certification to be appointed as a planner, the state of New Jersey requires all professional planners to undergo certification from the State Board of Professional Planners. This requirement does not apply to other planning-adjacent professions, such as land surveyors, engineers, or registered architects.

Urban planners in the United States are responsible for devising a development plan for cities. The American Planning Association (APA) oversees planners across the USA, although regional and national planning is not a well-defined field as planners' responsibilities vary from state to state. In Hawaii, planners manage state land use while in Vermont, regional planners exist only to monitor local planners.

In 1954, the District of Columbia Redevelopment Land Agency (DCRLA) won in the case Berman v. Parker, which set a nation-wide precedent for using eminent domain as a means of revitalizing urban cores. However, planning commissions still need to battle the interests of private corporations and wealthy residents, who expect compensation from governments. This is in contrast to the planning culture in the United Kingdom, where such legal battles are seldom.

== Urban planning in media ==
In the Seinfeld episode "The Van Buren Boys," George offers a scholarship to an average student who is initially interested in becoming an architect, but later decides they are more interested in urban planning.

Mark Brendanawicz is a fictional character in the NBC comedy series Parks and Recreation. He is the city planner for Pawnee, Indiana.

== See also ==
- List of urban planners
- List of urban theorists
- List of landscape architects
- Landscape architect
- Municipal engineering
- Urban planning education
- Royal Town Planning Institute
