= Nina-Marie Lister =

Canadian urban planning academic (born 1966)

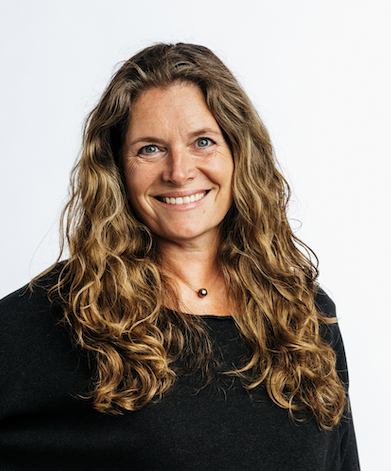
- Occupation: Graduate program director and associate professor, School of Urban and Regional Planning at Toronto Metropolitan University
- Known for: Ecological design; Biophilic design; Landscape planning; Complex adaptive systems

Academic background
- Education: University of Toronto; University of Waterloo

Academic work
- Institutions: Toronto Metropolitan University; Harvard University
- Website: ecologicaldesignlab.ca

Nina-Marie Lister (born March 14, 1966) is Professor and Graduate Director of the School of Urban and Regional Planning at Toronto Metropolitan University (previously Ryerson University), where she also leads the Ecological Design Lab. In 2021, she was appointed a Senior Fellow of Massey College. From 2010 to 2014, she was a Visiting associate professor of landscape architecture and urban planning at Harvard Graduate School of Design. Her career has spanned private and public-sector work, integrating ecological science with planning and design. As both a researcher and a practitioner, she is founding principal of PLANDFORM, a creative design practice. Lister's work focuses on the intersection of landscape infrastructure and ecological processes in metropolitan areas.

== Background and education ==
A registered professional planner (MCIP, RPP), Lister has post-graduate training in ecology, environmental science, landscape planning, and urban planning. As a researcher, teacher, and practitioner, Lister uses an integrated design-research approach to explore resilience and adaptive systems design in urbanizing regions. Emphasizing ecosystem complexity and biodiversity, her work is positioned at the confluence of landscape, ecology, and urbanism. She founded PLANDFORM in 2006.

== Professional career ==
At Toronto Metropolitan University, Lister founded and directs the Ecological Design Lab, a collaborative incubation innovator and experimental generator that aims to advance ecological design research and practice. She is a member of the Toronto Metropolitan University's Urban Water Centre, where she contributes work on designing resilient green and blue infrastructure for flood-friendly cities. Since 2016, her work has been funded by a SSHRC Partnership Development Grant and a Graham Foundation publication grant.

In her professional practice, Lister regularly collaborates with international design firms on submissions to juried competitions and exhibitions, with a particular focus on speculative and built works in metropolitan areas. In 2010, she served as the Professional Advisor for the ARC International Wildlife Crossing Design Competition, which focused on creating a wildlife bridge at the Vail Pass in Colorado. Her work has been featured in international exhibitions, including the 2016 Venice Architectural Biennale, where she contributed to Canada's entry, EXTRACTION, an examination of Canada's role as a global resource juggernaut. She is the curator and director of XING - (re)connecting landscapes, a permanent exhibition at the Toronto Zoo exploring the relationship between wildlife, human development, and urban infrastructure.

She is the co-editor of Projective Ecologies (with Chris Reed, Harvard GSD and ACTAR Press, 2014) and The Ecosystem Approach: Complexity, Uncertainty, and Managing for Stability (with David Waltner-Toews and James Kay, Columbia University Press, 2008). In addition to authoring over 100 professional and scholarly articles, including contributions to Design With Nature Now (Lincoln Land Institute, 2019), Nature & Cities: The Ecological Imperative in Urban Planning & Design (Lincoln Land Institute, 2016), Is Landscape…Essays on the Identity of Landscape (Routledge, 2016), Ecological Urbanism (Harvard GSD with Lars Müller Publishers, 2010), and Large Parks (Princeton Architectural Press, 2008, winner of the J.B. Jackson Book Prize), Lister has served as guest editor of the Journal of Ecological Restoration.

Lister was awarded an honorary membership in the American Society of Landscape Architects in recognition of her international leadership in ecological design. She was also named Senior Scholar with the Centre for Humans and Nature in 2012, and a Senior Fellow of Massey College in 2021.

=== Major publications (editor) ===
- Projective Ecologies (with Chris Reed. Harvard and ACTAR Press, 2014)
- The Ecosystem Approach: Complexity, Uncertainty, and Managing for Stability (with David Waltner-Toews and James Kay. Columbia University Press, 2008)

=== Exhibitions ===
- Conversations with Nature, Melt Studio Gallery
- Love Letters to the Muted World: Exhibition with Katrine Claassens, 99 Loop Gallery
- Venice Architectural Biennale, 2016
- Canadian Centre for Architecture, Montreal
- Chicago Architecture Foundation
- Toronto Design Exchange
- Van Alen Institute (New York)

=== Awards ===
- Honorary Membership: American Society of Landscape Architects
- Senior Scholar: Centre for Humans and Nature
