= David Waltner-Toews =

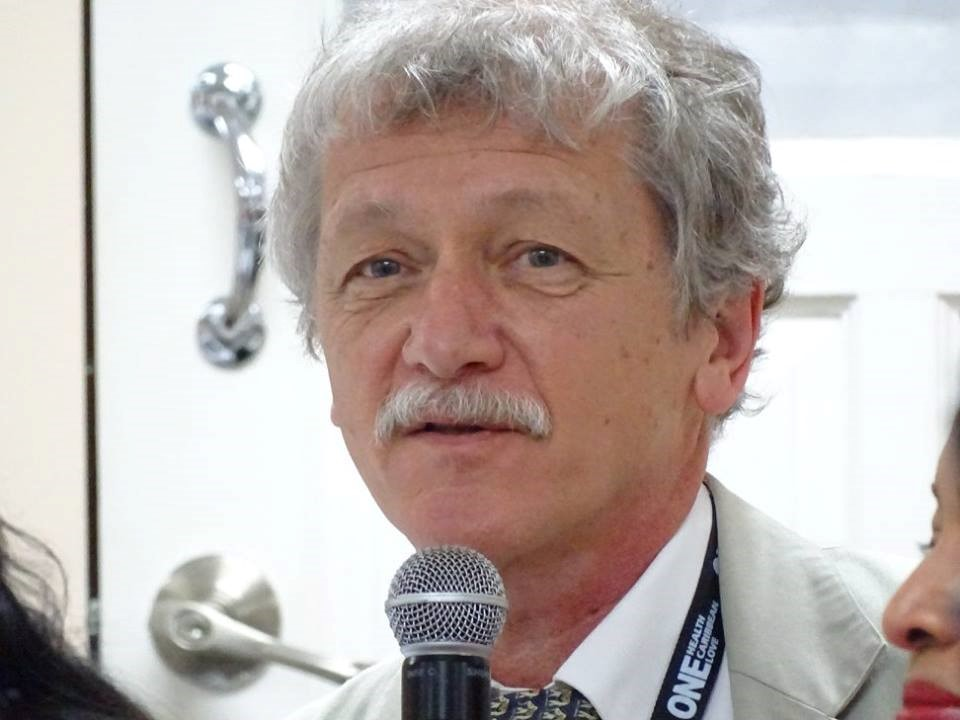
David Waltner-Toews, November 2016

David Waltner-Toews OC (born 1948 in Winnipeg, Manitoba) is a Canadian epidemiologist, essayist, poet, fiction writer, veterinarian, and a specialist in the epidemiology of food and waterborne diseases, zoonoses and ecosystem health. He is best known for his work on animal and human infectious diseases in relation to complexity. He lives in Kitchener, Ontario.

== Early life ==
Waltner-Toews was born in 1948 in Winnipeg, Manitoba. He attended the United College (University of Winnipeg) and finished his Bachelor of Arts degree at Goshen College in 1971. He received a Doctor of Veterinary Medicine from the Western College of Veterinary Medicine at the University of Saskatchewan in 1978 and a PhD in Epidemiology at the University of Guelph in 1985.

== Career ==
A University Professor Emeritus in the Department of Population Medicine at the University of Guelph, he is the founding president of Veterinarians without Borders/ Vétérinaires sans Frontières - Canada, founding president of the Network for Ecosystem Sustainability and Health, and one of the founding members of the Community of Practice for Ecosystem Approaches to Health – Canada.

Besides about 100 peer-reviewed scholarly papers and a textbook (Ecosystem Sustainability and Health: a practical approach, Cambridge, 2004), he has published half a dozen books of poetry, a collection of poems and recipes, an award-winning collection of short stories (One Foot in Heaven), a murder mystery (Fear of Landing) and a book about the natural history of diseases people get from animals (The Chickens Fight Back: Pandemic Panics and Deadly Diseases that Jump from Animals to Humans). In 2011, he collaborated with artist Diane Maclean on her exhibition Bird at Killhope North of England Lead Mining Museum, contributing a new poem, The Love Song of the Javanese Singing Cock

== Work ==
Waltner-Toews is best known for his initiatives to integrate human, animal, and ecosystem health in research, practice and teaching. This work, bridging natural sciences, humanities, and social sciences, has drawn considerably on the ideas of post-normal science, as developed by Silvio Funtowicz and Jerome Ravetz. He has been instrumental in the development of ecohealth teaching and training manuals for North America and Europe as well as Asia.

== Books ==
- The Ecosystem Approach: Complexity, Uncertainty and Managing for Sustainability (with James Kay and Nina-Marie Lister)
- Ecosystem Sustainability and Health: a practical approach
- Food, Sex and Salmonella: Why Our Food Is Making Us Sick
- The Earth is One Body
- Good Housekeeping
- The Fat Lady Struck Dumb
- One Foot in Heaven
- Fear of Landing
- The Chickens Fight Back: Pandemic Panics and Deadly Diseases that Jump from Animals to Humans
- One Animal Among Many: Gaia, Goats and Garlic
- The Origin of Feces: What Excrement Tells Us About Evolution, Ecology, and a Sustainable Society
- Eat the Beetles! An Exploration into Our Conflicted Relationship with Insects
- On Pandemics: Deadly Diseases from Bubonic Plague to Coronavirus
- A Conspiracy of Chickens: a memoir

== Awards ==
- 2006 Winner, Best Regional Fiction – Canada West, Independent Publisher Book Awards, for One Foot in Heaven
- 2007 Finalist, Canadian Science Writers' Association Book Award, for Chickens Fight Back
- 2014 Outstanding Contribution to the Field of Eco-Health
- 2014 Silver Medal, Independent Publisher Book Awards (Environment/ ecology/ nature)
- 2014 Finalist, Canadian Science Writers' Book Award for The Origin of Feces
- 2019 Covetrus International Veterinary Community Service Award "veterinarians who have exhibited exceptional acts of valour and commitment in the face of adversity to service the community."
- 2022 Appointed an Officer of the Order of Canada for his "leadership and expertise in ecosystem approaches to health, and for supporting development worldwide."
