= Association of African Planning Schools =

- Abbreviation: AAPS
- Formation: 1999; 27 years ago
- Type: Non-profit organization
- Legal status: Association
- Headquarters: Cape Town; South Africa
- Region served: Africa
- Fields: Urban planning
- Website: africanplanningschools.org.za

The Association of African Planning Schools (AAPS) is a network of African universities and colleges that offer programmes on urban and regional planning in Africa. The AAPS promotes knowledge exchange among African schools of planning regarding the training and education of planners.

== History ==
The AAPS was founded in 1999 with a mission to transform planning education in an African context, advocating for sustainable, participatory, and inclusive planning practices. The Association of African Planning Schools (AAPS) has accumulated more than forty member schools across Africa.

== See also ==
- Urban planning in Africa
- Glensburg Town Planners
