= Post-nominal letters =

Letters placed after a person's name bestowing a rank or title to them

Post-nominal letters, also called post-nominal initials, post-nominal titles, designatory letters, or simply post-nominals, are letters placed after a person's name to indicate that the individual holds a position, an academic degree, accreditation, an office, a military decoration, or honour, or is a member of a religious institute or fraternity. An individual may use several different sets of post-nominal letters, but in some contexts it may be customary to limit the number of sets to one or just a few. The order in which post-nominals are listed after a name is based on rules of precedence and what is appropriate for a given situation. Post-nominal letters are one of the main types of name suffix. In contrast, pre-nominal letters precede the name rather than follow it, such as addressing a physician or professor as "Dr. Smith".

== List ==
Different awards and post-nominal letters are in use in the English-speaking countries.

== Usage ==
=== Listing order ===
The order in which post-nominal letters are listed after a person's name is dictated by standard practice, which may vary by region and context.

==== In Australia ====
Various University Style Guides, such as: the University of Sydney Style Guide and the Australian Government Style Manual and that of the various State Governments.

Outside of any specific academic or State or Federal Government requirement, then in the following order:

1. Those Honours promulgated by the Governor-General in the Commonwealth Government Gazette, e.g. Current National and former Imperial honours
2. Those Honours and Appointments promulgated by a State Governor or Territory Administrator in the relevant State Government Gazette, e.g. Fellows of the Royal Society of NSW (FRSN), King's Counsels (KC).
3. All honorary degrees included in an Australian university's Annual Report to an Australian Parliament.
4. Fellowships and memberships of professional bodies and learned societies incorporated by a statutory instrument i.e. a Royal Charter under the Australian (not a foreign) Crown (e.g. the Australian Academy of Science, the Australian Academy of the Humanities, the Institution of Engineers Australia, the Australian Institute of Building, and the Australian Institute of Mining and Metallurgy) or an Act of Parliament (such as the Bar Associations of some States)
5. Parliamentary designations
6. Foreign Honours where permitted by Australian Federal Minister for Foreign Affairs.
7. Fellowships and memberships of other Australian Professional Institutions.
8. Australian Qualifications, ideally with date and institution, in descending order (with the highest closest after the name).
9. Foreign Professional Memberships.
10. Foreign Qualifications.

==== In Canada ====
The Canadian government's The Canadian Style specifies that no more than two sets of post-nominal letters should normally be given, unless all are to be given either for information or for reasons of protocol, and that these should be the two highest of different types. The types and the order in which they are given are:

1. Distinctions conferred directly by the Crown
2. University degrees
3. Memberships of societies and other distinctions

==== In European fraternities ====
Going back to the mid 17th century, today's classical European fraternities such as the German Student Corps have used post-nominal symbols and letters to allow their members to indicate their fraternity membership and honorary positions held in their signature.

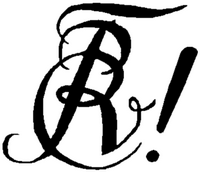
The Zirkel of a German Student Corps. This symbol captures the letters "v, c, f, A", as post-nominal for that fraternity.

==== Order of post-nominals in the UK ====
===== Civil usage in the UK =====
In the United Kingdom various sources have issued guidance on the ordering of styles and titles for British citizens, including the Ministry of Justice, Debrett's and A & C Black's Titles and Forms of Address; these are generally in close agreement, with the exception of the position of MP, etc., in the listing:

1. Bt/Bart or Esq;
  - In the UK, "Esq." may refer to any gentleman in place of the pre-nominal Mr or Dr;
2. British Orders and decorations (e.g. OBE; in descending order of precedence);
3. Crown Appointments, i.e.:
  1. Privy Counsellor (PC), Personal aide-de-camp (ADC), Physician to the King (KHP), Honorary Surgeon to the King (KHS), Honorary Dental Surgeon to the King (KHDS), Honorary Nursing Sister to the King (KHNS), and Honorary Chaplain to the King (KHC)
  2. King's Counsel (KC), Justice of the Peace (JP) and Deputy Lieutenant (DL); (according to the Ministry of Justice) Member of Parliament or of a devolved assembly (MP, MSP, MS, MLA);
4. University degrees:
  - According to Debrett's, DD, MD and MS degrees are always given; other doctorates, other medical degrees, and other divinity degrees are sometimes given; and other degrees are seldom shown, with BA and MA never used socially (although formal lists may include them);
5. 1. Religious institutes (e.g. SSF),
  2. Medical qualifications (e.g. FRCP);
6. 1. Fellowship of learned societies (e.g., FRS, FRSA, FRGS),
  2. Royal Academicians and associates, (e.g., RA, ARA),
  3. Fellowships, Membership, etc. of professional institutions, associations, etc. (e.g. FICE) – chartered and other professional statuses should be shown before the designatory letters for the relevant professional body (e.g. CEng FMIET; EngTech TMIET),
  4. According to Debrett's: Writers to the Signet (WS);
7. According to Debrett's and Black's: Member of Parliament (MP), etc. (Black's also includes Writers to the Signet here);
8. Membership of the Armed Forces (e.g. RAF, RN, VR, RM, RMP) (not included by Black's).

In addition, British citizens who have received honours from Commonwealth countries are usually given permission from the King to use the postnominals for that honour.

===== Academic usage in the UK =====
The Oxford University Style Guide and the University of Nottingham Style Guide give the alternative ordering:

1. Civil honours
2. Military honours
3. KC
4. Degrees in the order:
  1. Bachelor's
  2. Master's
  3. Doctorates
  4. Postdoctoral
5. Diplomas
6. Certificates
7. Membership of academic or professional bodies

This differs from the civil ordering in that it omits appointments except for KC, includes diplomas and certificates in addition to degrees, merges medical qualifications, fellowships of learned societies, royal academicians, and membership of professional bodies into a single item, and omits membership of the armed forces.

Loughborough University gives a very similar ordering, but with "Appointments (e.g MP, KC)" replacing item 3 (KC) and "Higher Education awards (in ascending order, commencing with undergraduate)" replacing items 4–6 (degrees, diplomas and certificates). This restores the Appointments section from the civil list omitted by Oxford and Nottingham, although the other differences remain.

Nottingham Trent University gives essentially the same ordering as Oxford and Nottingham, but without specifying the order in which degrees should be given. Nottingham Trent, Oxford and Loughborough recommend degree abbreviations be given in mixed case without stops between the letters (e.g. BA, not B.A.; PhD, not Ph.D.), as does Cambridge. Imperial College London, however, uses all small caps for post-nominals (e.g. phd, not PhD).

Where all degrees are shown, as in university calendars, most universities will give these in ascending order. However, advice on the precise ordering varies:

- The Oxford University Calendar Style Guide places degrees in the order: bachelor's degrees (including postgraduate bachelor's degrees such as the Oxford BCL) and other first degrees; master's degrees (including those that are first degrees, such as MPhys); doctorates; higher doctorates in order of academic precedence. Degrees at the same level are ordered alphabetically by awarding institution and multiple degrees from the same institution are grouped, with position determined by the lowest degree in the grouping. Certificates and diplomas are listed after degrees (no mention is made of foundation degrees). Oxford recommends giving institution names separated by a space from the degree, not enclosed in parentheses, and that degrees from the same institution be separated by spaces only, with commas between degrees from different institutions.
- Loughborough University advises listing all higher education awards in ascending order starting from undergraduate, so MPhys would come before BCL and postgraduate certificates and diplomas would come between undergraduate and postgraduate degrees. The examples given do not include institution names.

==== Order of post-nominals in the United States ====
In the United States, standard protocol is to list post-nominal letters in the following order:

1. Religious institutions
2. Theological degrees
3. Military decorations
4. Academic degrees
5. Honorary degrees, honors, decorations
6. Professional licenses, certifications and affiliations
7. Retired uniformed service.

Active duty services personnel do not use any post-nominals other than, if applicable, Staff Corps affiliation (Navy only) followed by a comma and then their branch of service. Names are bracketed by the appropriate pre-nominal and post-nominal, e.g. LCDR John Q Public, MC, USN.

=== Etiquette for higher educational qualifications ===
==== Higher education qualifications in the UK ====
In the UK, it is usual to list only doctorates, degrees in medicine, and degrees in divinity. In particular, when a person has letters indicating Crown honours or decorations, only the principal degree would normally be given. The University of Oxford Style Guide advises writers: "Remember that you do not need to list all awards, degrees, memberships etc held by an individual – only those items relevant to your writing."

In an academic context, or in formal lists, all degrees may be listed in ascending order of academic status, which may not be the same as the order in which they were obtained (although see notes on medical qualifications, below). The Oxford style is to list qualifications by their title starting with bachelor's degrees, then master's degrees, then doctorates. Postgraduate Certificates and Diplomas are listed after doctorates, but before professional qualifications, with a similar ordering being used by other universities. In this style, foundation degrees and other sub-bachelor qualifications are not shown. An alternative style is to give all higher education qualifications, starting from undergraduate, ordered by their level rather than their title. In this style, one might list a Certificate or Diploma of Higher Education first, then foundation degrees, first degrees at bachelor level, first degrees at master level (integrated master's degrees and first degrees in medicine), postgraduate degrees at master level (including postgraduate bachelor's degrees such the Oxford BCL), and doctorates. In this style, postgraduate certificates and diplomas could be shown either before postgraduate degrees at master's level (as in the table given by Loughborough University) or before first degrees at master's level (reflecting their position in the Frameworks for Higher Education Qualifications of UK Degree-Awarding Bodies). Strictly speaking, both the Debrett's and Ministry of Justice lists only allow for the inclusion of degrees, not non-degree academic awards.

For someone with a substantive doctorate, it is usual either to give "Dr" as the title (without a stop per normal British usage) or to list their degrees post-nominally, e.g. "Dr John Smith" or "John Smith, PhD" but not "Dr John Smith, PhD". Postnominals may be used with other titles, e.g. "Mr John Smith, PhD", "Sir John Smith, PhD", or "The Rev John Smith, PhD".

In the case of a BA from Oxford, Cambridge or Dublin who proceeds to be an MA of those universities (which is taken without further study), the MA replaces the BA and thus only the MA should be listed. Oxford has said that there is no risk of confusion between their MA and "earned" MAs as the Oxford MA is denoted "MA (Oxon)" rather than simply MA. However, Debrett's has advised using just "MA" to describe a Cambridge Master of Arts.

Graduates from British and Irish universities sometimes add the name of the university that awarded their degree after the post-nominals for their degree, either in parentheses or not, depending on preferred style. University names are often abbreviated and sometimes given in Latin, e.g."BA, MA (Dunelm), PhD (Ebor)"; a list of abbreviations used for university names can be found at Universities in the United Kingdom#Post-nominal abbreviations. Where the same degree has been granted by more than one university, this can be shown by placing the names or abbreviations in a single bracket after the degree name, e.g. "Sir Edward Elgar, Mus.D. (Oxon., Cantab., Dunelm. et Yale, U.S.A.), LL.D. (Leeds, Aberdeen, and W. University, Pennsylvania.)".

Honorary degrees, if shown, can be indicated either by "Hon" before the post-nominals for the degree or "hc" (for honoris causa) after the post-nominals, e.g. "Professor Evelyn Algernon Valentine Ebsworth CBE, PhD, MA, ScD, DCL hc, FRSC, FRSE" (emphasis added); "Professor Stephen Hawking Hon.ScD, CH, CBE, FRS" (emphasis added). The Oxford University Calendar Style Guide recommends not giving honorary degrees in post-nominals.

==== Higher education qualifications in the US ====
In academia and research, all degrees may be listed. In general, however, it is normal to only list those relevant to the circumstance. For example, if Jane Doe had a BS, MS, and PhD in computer science as well as an MBA, then if working in management in a retail company she would write "Jane Doe, MBA", but if working in an IT company she might write "Jane Doe, PhD", and if working in academia she could write "Jane Doe, BS, MS, MBA, PhD".

The Gregg Reference Manual recommends placing periods between the letters of post-nominals (e.g., B.S., Ph.D.); however, The Chicago Manual of Style recommends writing degrees without periods (e.g., BS, PhD). If post-nominals are given, the full name should be used, without Dr., Mr., Ms., Mrs., or Miss. Other prefixes (e.g., Professor) may be used.

=== Etiquette for medical qualifications ===
==== Medical qualifications in the UK ====
In contrast to the style for academic qualifications, medical qualifications are listed in descending order, i.e.: doctorates, master's degrees, bachelor's degrees, postgraduate diplomas, and qualifying diplomas. Letters indicating doctorates, master's degrees and fellowships of royal colleges are always given, while bachelor's degrees, memberships and qualifying diplomas are only shown for people with no higher qualifications. In all but formal lists, only three medical qualifications are normally given.

Where someone holds qualifications in multiple fields, they are normally given in the order: medicine, surgery (except for MRCS, which is considered a qualifying diploma), obstetrics, gynaecology and other specialities. These are followed by qualifying diplomas and other diplomas.

The academic style guides do not have a separate section for medical qualifications, so if following one of these guides, medical degrees should be listed with other degrees, medical diplomas with other diplomas, and fellowships and memberships of royal colleges with other fellowships and memberships of professional bodies.

=== Etiquette for fellowships or memberships ===
==== Learned societies and professional bodies in Africa ====
In Africa, learned societies and professional bodies use designatory letters for their members and fellowships. For example:

- An Associate of the African Planning Society uses the post-nominal AAPS, e.g. "George Kumba AAPS." A Member of the African Planning Society is entitled to use the post-nominal, MAPS, e.g. "Archimedes Muzenda MAPS." A Fellow of the African Planning Society is entitled to use postnominals, FAPS, e.g. "Innocent Chirisa FAPS."
- A Member of the Forestry Society of Kenya (FSK), a non-governmental professional membership organization of Kenyan Foresters, is entitled to use the post-nominal, MFSK, e.g. "Charity Kosgei MFSK."

==== Learned societies, royal academies and professional institutions in the UK ====
In the UK there is, according to Debrett's, no defined order of precedence for placing designatory letters for fellowships of learned societies and memberships of professional bodies within their respective groups. Debrett's suggests that "In practice, where one society is indisputably of greater importance than another the letters are usually placed in that order. Alternatively, the fellowship of the junior society may be omitted. If such precedence cannot be determined, the letters may be placed in order of conferment. Where this is not known, they may be placed in alphabetical order." Earlier guidance that "Strictly speaking, they should be arranged according to date of foundation or incorporation of the societies concerned" has now been removed.

Only postnominals indicating honorific fellowships (e.g., FRS, FBA, FREng) are normally used socially. For professional bodies it is usual to list those most relevant to a person's profession first, or those most relevant to the particular circumstances. It is common to omit fellowships (except honorific fellowships) and memberships that are not relevant in a given situation.

Debrett's notes that although Royal Academicians are listed after fellows of learned societies (and before members of professional bodies), they do not yield to them in precedence, "In practice the two lists do not coincide."

The distinction between a learned society and a professional body is not well defined. Many organisations (e.g., the Royal Society of Chemistry) claim to be both learned societies and professional bodies. However, it is clear from both the Ministry of Justice and Debrett's that only fellowships of learned societies are listed, while fellowships and memberships may be listed for professional bodies.

== Examples ==
Examples of post-nominal letters:

- A Knight Commander of the Order of the British Empire is authorised to use the post-nominal KBE, e.g. "Sir Terry Wogan KBE DL" (DL indicating he was Deputy Lieutenant of Buckinghamshire).
- A Fellow of the Royal Society uses the post-nominal FRS and a Fellow of the Royal Society of Edinburgh FRSE, e.g. "Professor Malcolm Longair CBE, FRS, FRSE" (CBE indicating he is also a Commander of the Order of the British Empire).
- A Doctor of Philosophy may use the post-nominal PhD or DPhil (according to the usage of the awarding institution), or the pre-nominals Dr or Dr., e.g. Indiana Jones could be styled "Dr. Henry Walton Jones, Jr." or "Henry Walton Jones, Jr., PhD", but not "Dr. Henry Walton Jones, Jr., PhD".
- A Postgraduate Diploma is indicated by the post-nominals PgDip. Someone with a BA, MA and postgraduate diploma could write "BA PgDip MA" or (following the Oxford Calendar's style) "BA MA PgDip".
- Commonly seen postnominals for religious orders include OFM for the Franciscans (Order of Friars Minor), SJ for the Jesuits (Society of Jesus), e.g. "Jorge Bergoglio, SJ, and OP for the Dominicans (Order of Preachers); most other Catholic religious institutes have specific post-nominal letters.
- A member of the British parliament may use the postnominals "MP", e.g. "Caroline Lucas MP". Note the post-nominals MP may not be used once someone ceases to be a Member of Parliament, including after Parliament has been dissolved for an election.
- A peer who is a member of the Privy Council may use the postnominals "PC"; for non-peers, the pre-nominal "Right Honourable", abbreviated "Rt Hon", identifies them as members. Thus: "The Rt Hon Rishi Sunak", but "The Rt Hon Earl Grey KG PC" (KG indicating he was also a Knight of the Garter).
- Chartered status is shown before the relevant professional membership, e.g. "Prof. Dame Carole Jordan DBE FRS CPhys FInstP", where DBE indicates Dame Commander of the Order of the British Empire, FRS Fellow of the Royal Society, CPhys Chartered Physicist, and FInstP Fellow of the Institute of Physics, the awarding body for CPhys.
- In Belgium, the persons officially admitted to the Royal Association of Descendants of the Seven Noble Houses of Brussels are entitled to place the post-nominal initials PB (Patricius Bruxellensis) or – in case they hold a title of nobility – NBP (Nobilis Patricius Bruxellensis) behind their name.

== See also ==
- List of post-nominal letters
- Pre-nominal letters
