= Registered Professional Planner =

Registered Professional Planner (RPP) is the term for a registered urban planner in some Canadian Provinces and Territories. Some jurisdictions protect the RPP title, requiring individuals to be registered members of a professional association in order to use the title.

Canadian planners are registered to practice at the provincial or territorial level. Each provincial and territorial association of the Canadian Institute of Planners registers or licenses members to use the RPP title except for Quebec, Nova Scotia, and Newfoundland and Labrador. However, certification which leads to registration at the provincial level is standardized at the national level.

== "Right to Title" Legislation ==
Many of the provincial and territorial planning institutes have obtained "right to title" legislation, which means that only certified RPPs may use the title. The PSB notes, however, "Some provinces have extended this legislation to specify that certain planning tasks (typically at a senior level) may only be performed by an RPP."

== Federal Level ==
The Professional Standards Board (PSB) oversees the certification process to become a Registered Professional Planner on behalf of the Canadian Institute of Planners and the provincial and territorial associations which represent professional planners in their respective jurisdictions. The PSB provides three key services: certification, accreditation of university academic planning programs, and reciprocity links with other countries planning associations. First, for the certification process, the PSB assess applications, reviews the claims of mentorship and sponsorship of work experience, and delivers courses and examinations. Second, for accreditation, the PSB reviews university planning degrees. Finally, with regard to reciprocity links, the PSB facilitates reciprocity links with foreign planning institutes, which permits foreign planners to work in Canada and vice versa. The PSB does not provide certification in Quebec, where the l’Ordre des urbanistes du Québec (OUQ) does so.

=== Certification ===
There are three primary pathways to becoming certified as an RPP through the PSB:

- Accredited degree: Applicants empowered in the planning field with a degree from an accredited planning in Canada, Australia, or the United States may apply for certification through this route.
- Prior Learning Assessment and Recognition: Applicants who hold at-least a four-year undergraduate degree, not accredited by PSB but who have over five years of planning experience may apply for certification through this route.
- Reciprocity: Planners who are full-members of the Planning Institute of Australia or the American Institute of Certified Planners may apply for a reciprocal membership through this route,

Each of the entry pathways above permit an individual to apply for "candidate member" status with a provincial or territorial association. During the candidacy period, candidate members must complete mentorship of at-least one year with a senior RPP. Candidate members must also complete two-years of supervised work experience if applying through the accredited degree route, or one-year if apply through the other routes. Once the mentorship and work experience portions are complete, an ethics exam and a professional examination must be successfully completed for a candidate member to achieve full RPP status.

== Provincial and Territorial Level ==
=== British Columbia ===
Planners who are fully certified by the Planning Institute of British Columbia (PIBC) have "the exclusive right and privilege to utilize the professional title 'Registered Professional Planner' and designation 'RPP' in British Columbia".

=== Alberta ===
The Professional and Occupational Associations Registration Act is "right to title" legislation that provides planners in Alberta with the RPP title. However, there are no outlined fines for those who misrepresent themselves as RPPs.

The Alberta Professional Planners Institute regulates the planning profession in Alberta.

=== Saskatchewan ===
The Saskatchewan Professional Planners Institute regulates the granting of the RPP title under the authority of The Community Planning Profession Act. The Act provides "right to title" protections but explicitly notes that providing planning services is not restricted to RPPs. However, municipalities may only approve subdivisions if they employ a RPP. Further, any official plan in Saskatchewan must be prepared in consultation with a RPP.

=== Manitoba ===
As of 2015, Manitoba has protected the title "Registered Professional Planner" and the abbreviation RPP through legislation. Only individuals who are members in good standing of the Manitoba Professional Planners Institute may use the title RPP. Municipalities must consult with an RPP on the preparation of their development plan and regional plans must be prepared by an RPP.

=== Ontario ===
In Ontario, the Ontario Professional Planners Institute (OPPI) has the mandate to grant the title of RPP. Only full and retired members of OPPI may use the title of RPP.

If an individual falsely represents themselves as a professional planner, if that person is "guilty of an offence", they could be fined up to $5,000.

=== Quebec ===
Planners in Quebec are not titled or certified as RPPs. However, l'Ordre des Urbanistes du Québec licenses planners in Quebec following similar processes to other provinces. To work as a planner and provide professional advice or sign-off on plans, individuals must be licensed members of the order with a valid permit.

=== New Brunswick ===
The New Brunswick Association of Planners (NBAP) / l’Association des urbanistes du Nouveau-Brunswick (AUNB) is the provincial regulatory body for professional planners in New Brunswick. The RRP designation is restricted to members of NBAP / ANUB and is protected in law.

=== Nova Scotia ===
Professional planners in Nova Scotia who are members of the Licensed Professional Planners Association of Nova Scotia (LPPANS) may use the title Licensed Professional Planner (LPP), which is considered equivalent to the RPP designation. Nova Scotia law protects the LPP designation, and makes it an offence for anyone who is not a member of the LPPANS to use the designation.

=== Prince Edward Island ===
The Government of Prince Edward Island proclaimed the Registered Professional Planners Act in December 2020. This law recognizes the Island's professional planning institute and protects the RPP title, restricting its usage to members of the Prince Edward Island Institute of Professional Planners.

=== Newfoundland and Labrador ===
The Newfoundland and Labrador Association of Professional Planners does regulate the profession, as such there is no RPP or LPP designation available. However, like all Canadian planners who have completed certification requirements through the PSB, planners in Newfoundland and Labrador may full-memberships in the Canadian Institute of Planners allowing them the title MCIP.

=== Nunavut ===
Planners in Nunavut are regulated through the Alberta Professional Planners Institute.

=== Northwest Territories ===
Certification and registration of planners in the Northwest Territories is overseen by the Alberta Professional Planners Institute.

=== Yukon ===
Planners in Yukon are registered through the Planning Institute of British Columbia, which operates a Yukon chapter. They are subject to all the same requirements as other members of the PIBC.
