= Gabinete de Urbanização Colonial =

The Gabinete de Urbanização Colonial (1944-1974) of Portugal was a government office responsible for urban planning in Portuguese colonies in Africa and Asia. It began operating in 1945. In 1951 it became the Gabinete de Urbanização do Ultramar, and in 1957 the Direcção de Serviços de Urbanismo e Habitação of the Overseas Ministry public works department. Staff included Joao A. de Aguiar, Rogerio Cavaca, and Pinto Coelho.

== See also ==
- Urban planning in Africa: Portuguese colonies
- Portuguese colonies in Africa (20th c.):
  - Portuguese Congo
  - Portuguese Guinea
  - Portuguese Mozambique
  - Portuguese São Tomé and Príncipe
- List of ministries of Portugal

== Bibliography ==
- Ana Vaz Milheiro; Eduardo Costa Dias (2009). "Arquitectura em Bissau e os Gabinetes de Urbanização Colonial (1944–1974)" [Architecture in Bissau and the Colonial Urbanization Departments] (PDF). Arq.urb (in Portuguese) (2). São Paulo: Universidade São Judas Tadeu. ISSN 1984-5766. Archived from the original (PDF) on 2016-03-03.
