= Urban planning in Africa =

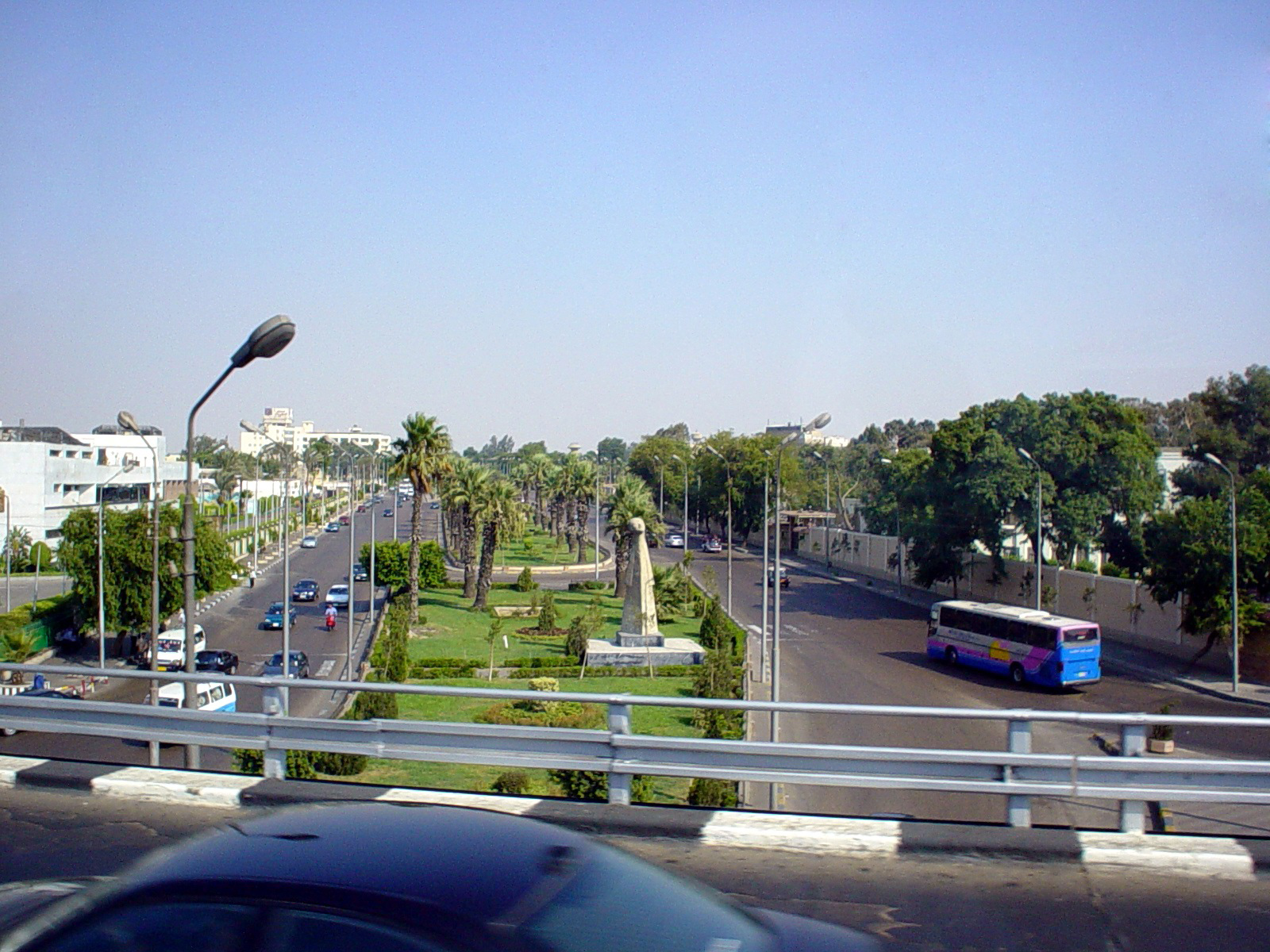
Roads of Cairo, Egypt.

Urban planning in Africa results from indigenous aesthetics and conceptions of form and function as well as the changes brought on by industrialization, modernization, and colonialism. Before the Berlin Conference of 1884 – 1885, which formalized colonialism in many parts of Africa, indigenous African cities and villages had ordered structures that varied along ethnic and religious lines and according to geography. All land-uses necessary for functioning––markets, religious sites, farms, communal assembly spaces––existed in ordered, rational ways, as did land property practices and laws, many of which changed under colonial control. Urbanity changed significantly from pre-colonial to colonial times, as slavery, Christianity, and a host of other forces caused a change in the population of indigenous urban dwellers.

== Pre-colonial urban planning ==
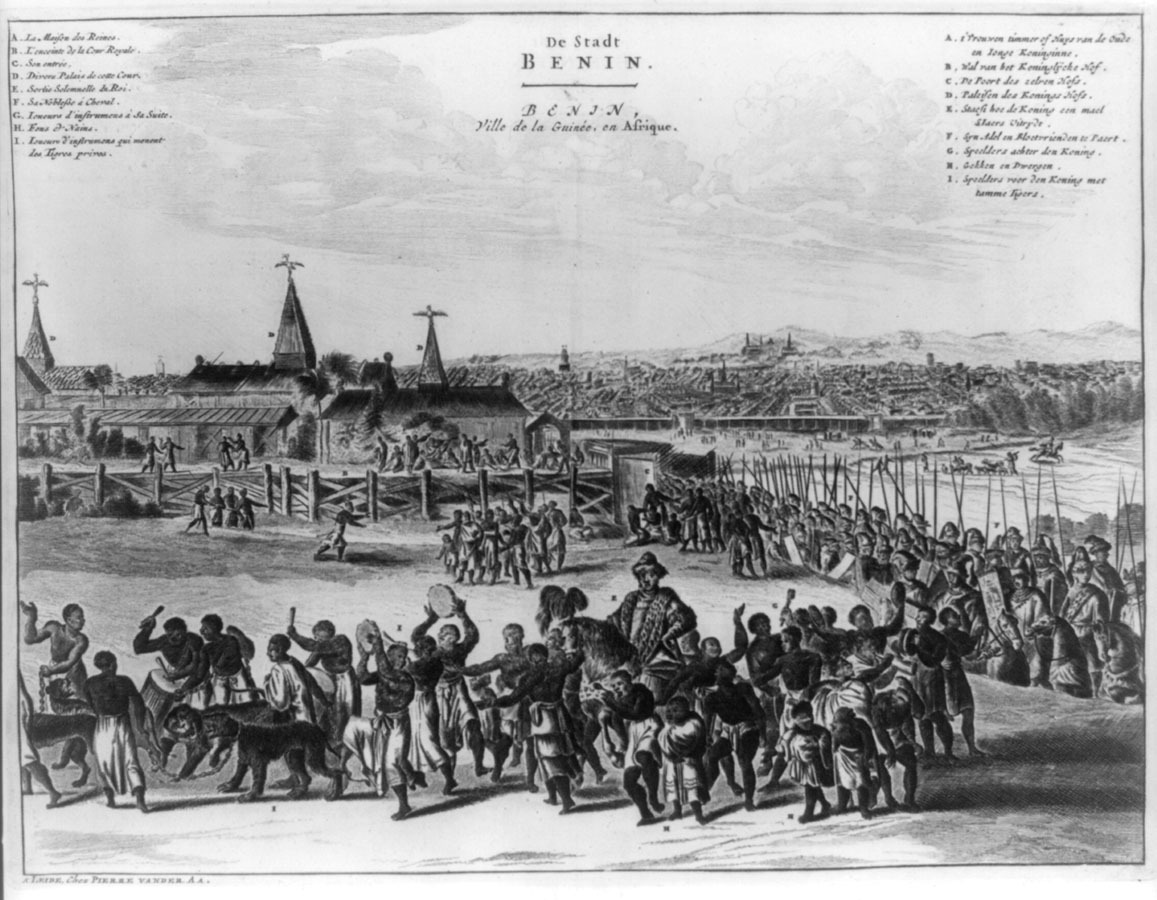
Benin City pre-colonization

As the term urban spatially implies the notion of density in human habitation, the term can also be applied then to indigenous nomadic African societies, like the San People of the Kalahari Desert, or the Aka, Efé and Mbuti people of central Africa. When considering the legitimacy of their relatively impermanent settlements, they are then revealed as some of the most well-planned urban areas in the world, as ephemeral as they may be. Their settlements require careful planning of three to thirty families, whose power is split relatively equally among one another. Different groups also adopt certain sets of planning standards. For example, the San People adopt an east axis from which older, then younger single men inhabit dwellings farther east from the main settlement.

Places like Benin City are striking examples of thriving pre-colonial cities. One explorer wrote in 1602 of the impressive city:

"The town seemeth to be great when you enter into it, you go into a great broad street, not paved, which seems to be seven or eight times broader than Warmoes Street [the main shopping district at the time] in Amsterdam; which goeth right out and never crooks...; it is thought that the street is a mile long [about 4 British miles] besides the suburbs...when you are in the great street aforesaid, you see many great streets on the sides thereof, which also go right forth...The houses in this town stand in good order, one close and even with the other...The King's Court is very great, within it having many great four-square plains, which round about them have galleries, wherein there is always watch kept."

While colonial cities elicited control through spatialized racial violence, places like Benin City elicited control through familial structures and many complex levels of these sociopolitical relationships.

=== The grid ===
While it is often thought that European colonization brought about the urban grid, which, with it, comes convenient provisioning of infrastructure and resources, some cities in what is modern day Senegal suggest otherwise. Maka, for example, was the capital city that united the kingdoms of Kayor, as were Kahone, capital of Saloum; Diakhao, capital of the Sereer kingdom; and Lambaye, capital of the kingdom of Baol, all had orthogonal grid systems, sometimes hundreds of years before any colonial existence. It is not believed that colonialism played any part whatsoever in the provisioning of these urban systems, either. And while the capitals of these places received special attention given their grid systems, most towns in Senegambia contained some form of a public square in a centrally located area.

While during the ancien régime, the urban grid mostly existed in places where elites lived, in Sufi orders in contemporary Senegal, the grid existed in all towns and cities, acting as a democratizing agent. The grid can no doubt be attributed to pre-colonial regimes, even though the contemporary grid under colonialism bears a certain resemblance to the grids of the past.

== Ethiopia ==
While Ethiopia was occupied by the Italians from 1936 - 1941, and many public works projects were commissioned during that time, such as the Addis Ababa-Asmara road, Ethiopia was one of the few countries in Africa that was never truly colonized. The Italian projects, by being on already-established trade routes, did not feel all that foreign.

Prior to Italian occupation, the Gebi, built by Addis Ababa's founder Menelik II, acted as the heart of the city. Between 1938 and 1940, Ignazio Guidi and Cesare Valle created a plan for the city that would build large arterial roads and create an axis that would relocate the urban center from one near the palace towards the south. Once Emperor Haile Selassie I came to power, he began shifting the urban center northward, building a parliament, but was dissatisfied, so began to move the urban center towards the south, where Guidi and Valle had initially planned. The Italian plan for the city followed certain rationalist principles that were then eventually adopted by Selassie.

As of 2017, "most Ethiopians live in scattered rural communities...with only about one-fifth of the population urbanized."

== Colonial African urban planning ==
After the Berlin Conference in the 1880s, colonial powers were slow to impose Western theories and methods of urban planning upon newly conceived colonies in Africa. In most places, it wasn't until the 1940s that colonial urban planning began to take effect. What little formal, technocratic urban planning took place before then existed only in the neighborhoods constructed for colonists.

=== Principle of segregation ===
Similar to Baron Georges-Eugène Haussmann's argument that demolishing much of Paris was necessary to create new boulevards that allowed for greater circulation and ensured public health, colonial planners in Africa argued that towns should segregate Europeans from Africans so as to ameliorate the "white man's grave" by combating tropical diseases such as malaria, yellow fever, and sleeping sickness. Sound urban planning, it was argued, would provide the light and air necessary to reduce the risk or even prevent these illnesses. Thus, intra-urban racial segregation was planned into all European colonies in Africa, with the areas for colonists usually the greenest, lushest, and most desirable areas. These were separated from the non-European parts of the city through natural features like riverbeds and hills, or through infrastructural features like rail lines or military installations. All were meant to create a hierarchy between colonists and indigenous people and created a stark level of inequality within the city.

=== British colonies ===
The Garden City Movement, which was founded by Ebenezer Howard in 1898 and advocated for greenbelts and low-density communities, influenced colonial planning in British colonies in Africa. The 1947 Town and Country Planning Act that passed in the United Kingdom and served as the modern foundation for town planning there eventually made its way to West African British colonies and eventually to Eastern and Southern Africa as well.

=== French colonies ===
After 1944, the French government held a conference in Brazzaville where it was declared that people in France's colonies had equal rights as French citizens. Directly after this decree, the French government mandated the preparation of urban plans in all urban centers in order to begin to balance the inequalities between colonists and indigenous peoples. It was also meant to be a way of increasing and improving trade logistics between the French government and the colonies.

==== Guinea ====
In Conakry, the capital of French Guinea from 1904-1958 (contemporary Guinea), the city was divided into three zones. "Housing the natives" became an important task for colonial powers, and in the city, three zones were created, the third of which was called the zone indigène, where traditional building materials were allowed for indigenous populations.

=== Portuguese colonies ===
The same year as the conference in Brazzaville, 1944, also brought the formation of the Gabinete de Urbanização Colonial (Colonial Urbanization Office), which required city planning for urban areas in Lusophone colonies. However, this only applied to urban areas occupied by colonists. This did not apply to all citizens until 1961 when Portugal abolished the Native Statute which acted as a means of segregating colonists and indigenous people.

== Postcolonial African urban planning ==
Decolonization had a significant impact on every nation-state and affected each one's urban planning practices very differently.

=== Ghana ===
Passed two years before the British Town and Country Planning Act, the 1945 Town and Country Planning Act, based on British Law, governed in contemporary Ghana both during and after colonization. However, from 1988-1989, the Provisional National Defence Council launched a decentralization campaign to bring planning power from a federal level down to a more local level, effectively allowing constituents to distance themselves from the colonial power and to regain power from the colonial regime. These decentralized planning units have continued to increase in number and influence, allowing for a more nuanced approach to urban planning. However, at the same time, these offices are funded nationally and as such can encounter problems when it comes to organization and participation as there is a lack of clarity regarding which ministries govern which planning departments in which municipalities and regions.

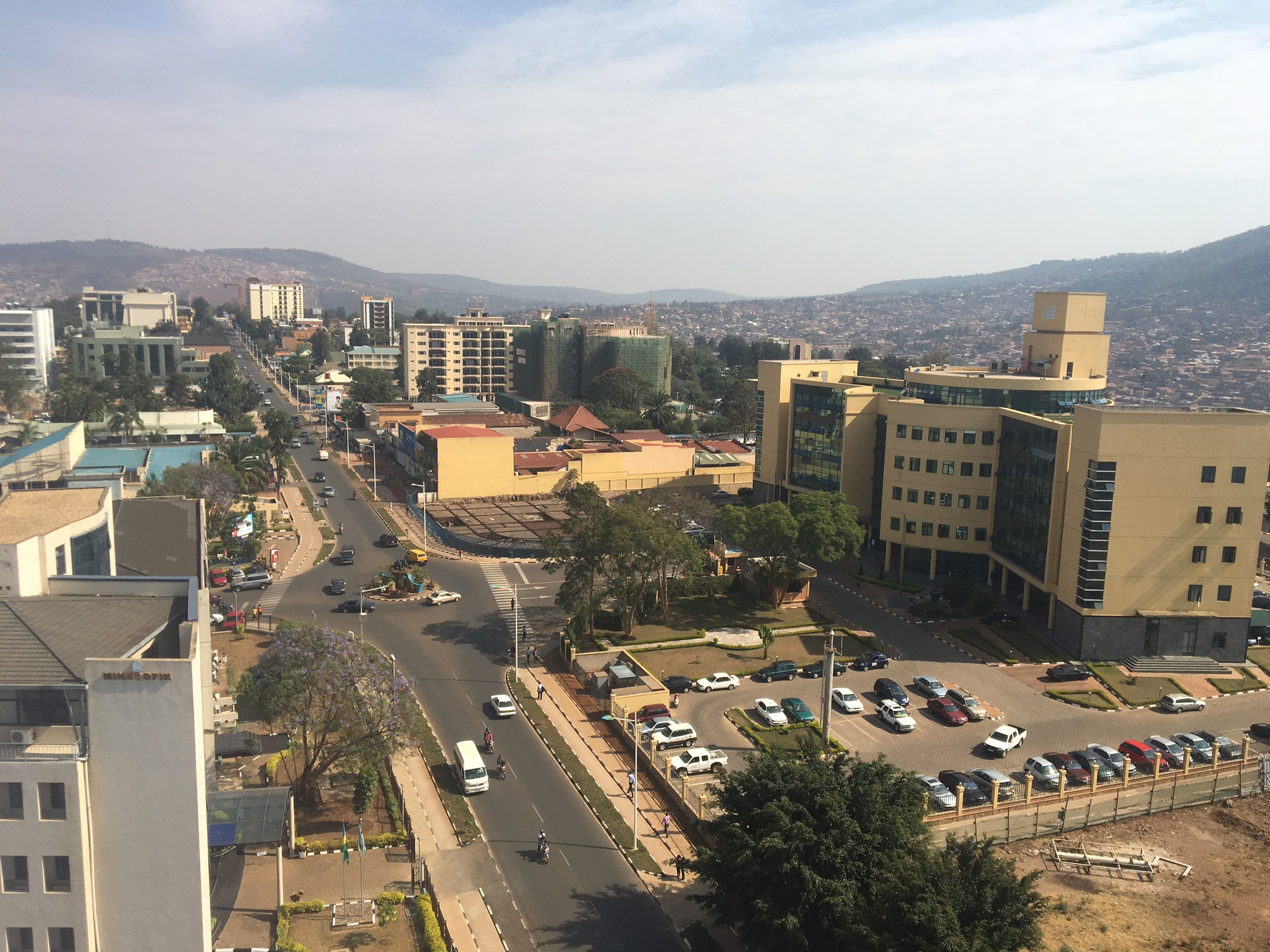
Large boulevards and Euclidean zoning patterns characterize the desired development in Kigali.

=== Nigeria ===
In Nigeria, the Nigerian Institute of Town Planners (NITP) and the Town Planners Registration Council (TOPREC) are the leading bodies tasked with the responsibility of improving the training, education and professional practice of planning in Nigeria.

To be a town planner in Nigeria, first must complete a degree in Urban and regional planning or a relevant discipline and then complete a final year in the form of a masters in Urban and regional planning which must be accredited by the Town Planners Registration Council (TOPREC ), or a four-year degree encapsulating all aspects. they can then become eligible to be a member of the Nigerian Institute of Town Planners (NITP), but must first complete two years work based training, to be a full member, and subsequently register and sit for the TOPREC professional examination, to become a registered town planner.

=== Rwanda ===
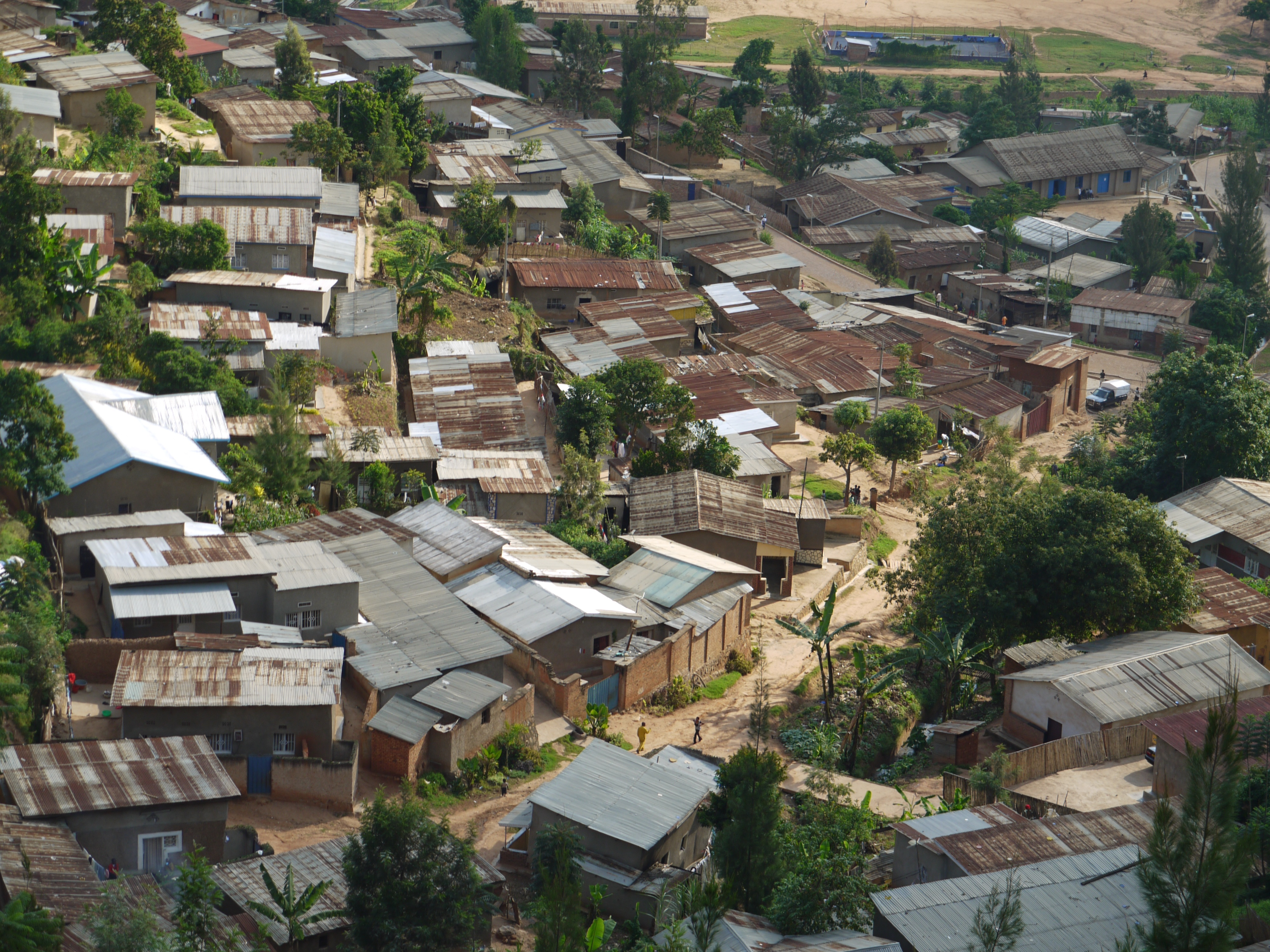
Kigali 2040 hopes to raze informal settlements like this one within the city, potentially demolishing places with social capital in favor of more ordered social housing.

Since the Rwandan genocide, President Paul Kagame has created ambitious plans to make Rwanda a middle-income country, as defined by the World Bank, by 2020. He calls the plan Vision 2020, and spurred a similar movement to redevelop the country's capital city, Kigali by 2040. Vision 2020 hopes to eliminate the informal settlements that currently exist, in a scheme similar in nature to that of urban renewal in America in the early twentieth century. The plan has also prioritized growth above all else, even if that means that the total amount of net official development assistance and official aid from foreign government grew by over 45% between 2006 and 2009. While the plan is celebrated by many, the plan also confronts potential challenges of suburbanization, a challenge constantly facing the United States today.

As of 2017 "almost three-fourths of the population is rural."

=== South Africa ===
Urban planning in South Africa was influenced greatly by apartheid. Planning standards established in the 1950s continued to dominate policies for forty years. Central government and some larger municipalities developed social housing at this time. the townships of Soweto, KwaMashu, Botshabello, Madadeni, were all planned according to the British New Town model, which mandated specific lot sizes for free-standing houses. These policies had a tremendous impact on the urban form of all cities in South Africa, essentially determining the density and subsequent atmosphere of the cities.

In the mid-1970s unplanned informal settlements began appearing outside the "white areas" of cities, further reinforcing and spatializing a racialized power differential.

=== Tanzania ===
Tanzania's land use regulatory system is still based upon the Town and Country Planning Act 1947, which was adopted in contemporary Tanzania in 1956 just before the independence of what was formerly known as Tanganyika. As colonization often skewed power towards officials and away from individuals, the land use regulations even after decolonization remained out of touch with the reality of most Tanzanians. However, in the past twenty years, urban planning has gradually begun to redistribute power more towards regular citizens. Participatory planning has become more widespread, through legislation like the 1982 Local Government (Urban Authorities) Act, the 1997 Regional Administration and Local Government Act, the 1995 National Land Policy, and the 1999 Land Act. However, insufficient government resources have been allocated to allow for these policies to affect smaller urban areas outside the major centers like Dar es Salaam, Mwanza, Arusha, Dodoma, and Mbeya.

As of 2017 "almost one-third of the population lives in urban areas, and more than one-tenth of the urban population resides in Dar es Salaam"

== See also ==
- African Planning Society
- Urbanization in Africa
- Lists of cities in Africa, mostly by country
- List of largest cities in Africa (in German)
- List of metropolitan areas in Africa
- Urban planning/development by country: Egypt, Nigeria, South Africa
  - In French: Algeria, Democratic Republic of the Congo, Ethiopia, Ivory Coast, Morocco, Tunisia, Zimbabwe
  - In German: Eritrea, The Gambia, Namibia

== Bibliography ==
- Urban Forum, South Africa: Witwatersrand University, ISSN 1015-3802. 1989-
- Isagha Diagana; Jérôme Chenal [in French]; Stephanie Hasler (2016). Villes africaines: restructuration des quartiers précaires [African cities: restructuring precarious neighborhoods]. BOOC (in French). École Polytechnique Fédérale de Lausanne. ISBN 9782889144013.
- Somik Vinay Lall; Vernon Henderson; Anthony J. Venables (2017). Africa's Cities: Opening Doors to the World. World Bank Group. hdl:10986/25896. ISBN 978-1-4648-1044-2.
