= Glensburg Cities Institute =

Think tank

- Abbreviation: GCI
- Nickname: Glensburg Institute
- Formation: 15 June 2017; 8 years ago
- Type: Think tank
- Purpose: Urban development research
- Headquarters: Johannesburg, South Africa
- Region served: Africa
- Fields: Urban planning; Regional planning
- Parent organization: Glensburg
- Staff: 12 FTEs (2022)
- Website: glensburg.co.za/institute
- Formerly called: African Planning Society

Glensburg Cities Institute (formerly the African Planning Society) is an urban development think tank of Glensburg that conducts research on urbanisation in Africa.

== History ==
The APS was formed in 2019 when African Urban Community of Practice (AUCOP), an initiative of Glensburg was merged with the African Planning Association into a professional membership organization. The need to develop a society of planning professionals goes back to 2002 when the African Planning Association was launched together with UN-HABITAT on the state of planning in Africa. The establishment of the African Planning Society arose from the realization of the rapid urbanization that was characterizing African cities in the post colonial era. Regardless of the rapid urbanisation, cities in Africa were not being planned well, calling for the strengthening of the planning profession in form of a society. The African Planning Society was mandated with reconciling the variations in the practice of planning in various regions of Africa. It also sought to address the challenges caused by colonial planning systems by adopting modern planning approaches. At the fifth Conference of the Association of African Planning Schools held in November 2021, African Planning Society was mandated with training planners in Africa on localization of planning theories to address urbanisation issues unique to the global south.

== Overview ==
Mandated with strengthening planning in Africa towards sustainable cities, APS has accumulated 52 country chapters and 12 divisions across Africa. The African Planning Society is organized into six regional chapters: Central Africa regional chapter, East Africa regional chapter, North Africa regional chapter, Southern Africa regional chapter, West Africa regional chapter and the International Chapter. Each regional chapter is organized further into country chapters.

Regional Group	Number of members	% of members	Executive Council members	General Assembly members	Division Council members	APS Presidents members	Country Chapters
Central Africa	54	3	1	11	1	0	8
East Africa	212	13	2	15	2	0	12
North Africa	109	7	2	9	1	0	5
Southern Africa	549	34	3	17	4	1	11
West Africa	613	38	3	20	3	0	16
International Chapter	84	5	1	7	1	0	4 (subregions)
Total APS members	1,621	100	12	79	12	1	56

== Governance ==
=== Executive Council ===
The APS Secretariat carries out the day-to-day duties of the African Planning Society. The secretariat implements the policies and resolutions of the general assembly and the executive council on the strengthening of planning in country chapters across Africa. It is headed by the secretary-general who is appointed by the General Assembly after being recommended by the Executive council. The secretary-general acts as the de facto spokesperson and leader of the African Planning Society. The secretary-general position is held for a five-year term renewable once. The current secretary-general is Archimedes Muzenda of Zimbabwe who previously served as director of he secretary from 1 January 2019.

=== General Assembly ===
The General Assembly is the deliberative assembly of the African Planning Society. It is composed of chairs of country chapters, divisions and regional chapters and presided by the president of the Executive council. The general assembly convenes in regular annual sessions on the sidelines of the African Planning Congress. When the general assembly decides on important issues such as those on establishment of new chapters and divisions, planning legislation and policies, or on budgetary matters, a two-thirds majority of those present and voting is required. All other issues are decided by a majority vote. The Assembly may make recommendations on any matters within the scope of the Society except for issues that are under consideration by the Executive council. The General Assembly also votes on the appointment of the secretary-general following recommendation by the Executive council.

- Chapters Council - The chapters council which makes up part of the general assembly is composed of chairs of country chapters led by a council chair elected among the chairs who also sits in the Executive council. The council advises the executive council on planning issues in country chapters.
- Divisions Council - The divisions council is composed of chairs of divisions and it makes up part of the general assembly. The council advises the executive council on thematic issues of planning across Africa.

=== APS Secretariat ===
The APS Secretariat carries out the day-to-day duties of the African Planning Society. The secretariat implements the policies and resolutions of the general assembly and the executive council on the strengthening of planning in country chapters across Africa. It is headed by the secretary-general who is appointed by the General Assembly after being recommended by the Executive council. The secretary-general acts as the de facto spokesperson and leader of the African Planning Society. The secretary-general position is held for a five-year term renewable once. The current secretary-general is Archimedes Muzenda of Zimbabwe who previously served as director of the secretary from 1 January 2019. The Secretariat is one of the three principal organs of the society. The role of the secretary-general as chief executive of the secretariat is laid out in the Constitution of the African Planning Society. The position of secretary-general was formed following the merger of African Urban Community of Practice (AUCOP) an initiative of African Urban Institute with the African Planning Association. His role also include as an advocate, a mediator in promotion of planning in Africa.

Secretaries-general of the African Planning Society
No.	Name	Country of origin	Took office	Left office	Time in office	Regional group	Notes	Ref
1	Archimedes Muzenda	Zimbabwe	1 January 2020	Incumbent	6 years, 115 days	Southern Africa	Inaugural secretary-general	

The Secretariat of the African Planning Society is divided into five directorates: Programmes, Professional Practice, Policy & Advocacy, Research, and Membership. The directorates are headed by directors who report to the secretary-general and among the directors are Maryjane Chikukwa.

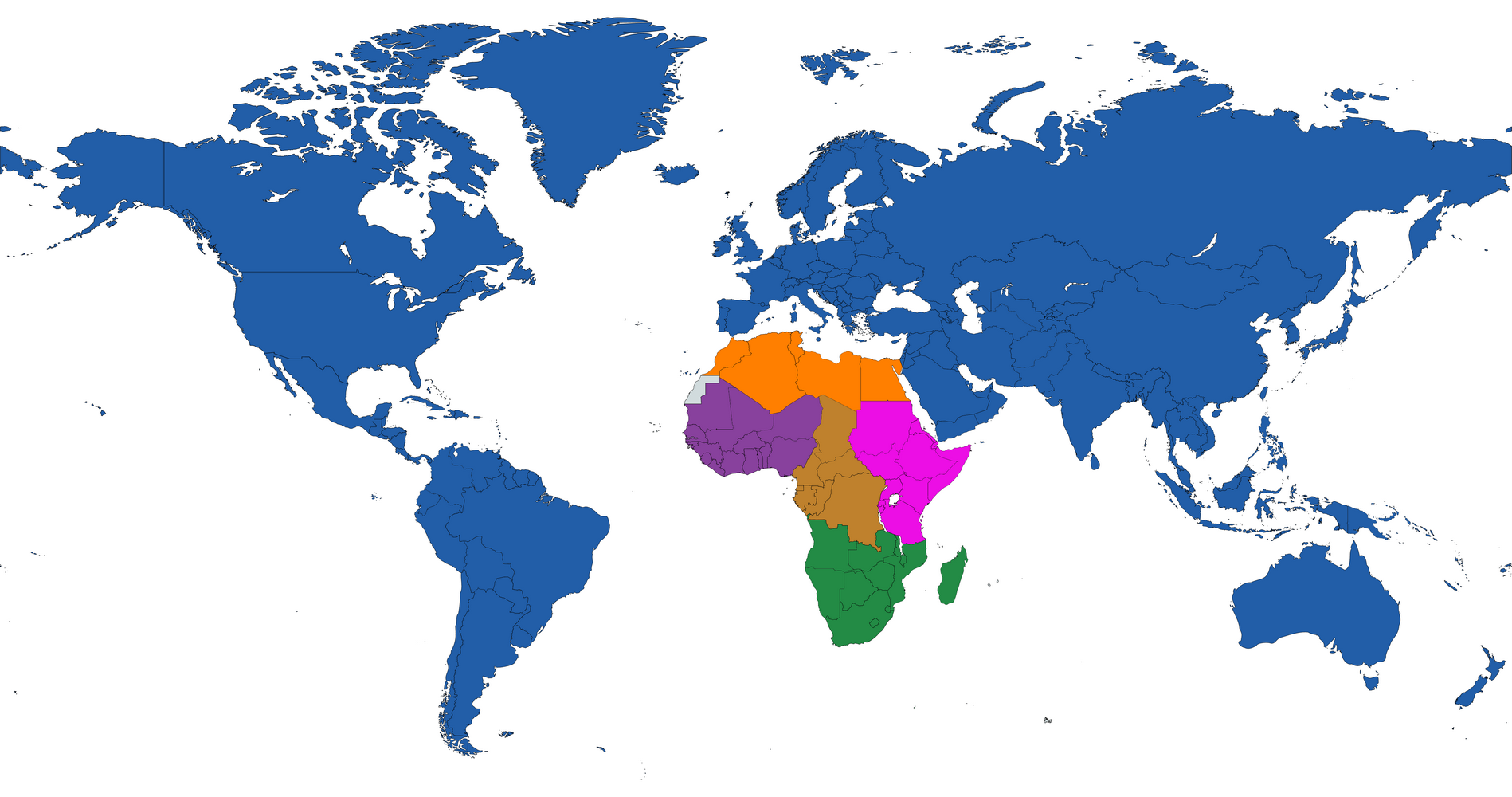
Central Africa Regional Chapter East Africa Regional Chapter North Africa Regional Chapter Southern Africa Regional Chapter West Africa Regional Chapter International Regional Chapter

== APS Regional Groups ==
=== Central Africa ===
The Central Africa regional chapter consists of 8 countries (15% of APS Country Chapters) Its territory is composed entirely of land from Central Africa. The Central Africa regional chapter has one permanent seat on APS Executive council and eight seats on APS Chapters Council. The regional chapter is responsible for electing a member who represents the region on the APS Executive council.

Country Chapters of the Central Africa region are as follows:

- Cameroon
- Central African Republic
- Chad
- Congo
- Democratic Republic of the Congo
- Equatorial Guinea
- Gabon
- São Tomé and Príncipe

=== East Africa ===
The East Africa regional chapter consists of 12 countries (23% of APS Country Chapters) Its territory is composed entirely of land from East Africa representing affairs of planning professionals in the region. The Central Africa regional chapter has one permanent seat on APS Executive council and twelve seats on APS Chapters Council. The regional chapter is responsible for electing a member who represents the region on the APS Executive council.

Country Chapters of the East Africa region are as follows:

- Burundi
- Comoros
- Djibouti
- Eritrea
- Ethiopia
- Kenya
- Mauritius
- Rwanda
- Seychelles
- Sudan
- Uganda
- United Republic of Tanzania

=== North Africa ===
The North Africa regional chapter consists of 5 countries (5% of APS Country Chapters) Its territory is composed entirely of land from North Africa representing affairs of planning professionals in the region. The North Africa regional chapter has 1 permanent seat on APS Executive Council and 5 seats on APS Chapters Council. The regional chapter is responsible for electing a member who represents the region on the APS Executive Council.

Country Chapters of the North Africa region are as follows:

- Algeria
- Egypt
- Libya
- Morocco
- Tunisia

=== Southern Africa ===
The Southern Africa regional chapter consists of 11 countries (21% of APS Country Chapters) Its territory is composed entirely of land from Southern Africa representing affairs of planning professionals in the region. The Southern Africa regional chapter has one permanent seat on APS Executive council and 11 seats on the APS Chapters Council. The regional chapter is responsible for electing a member who represents the region on the APS Executive council.

Country Chapters of the Southern Africa region are as follows:

- Angola
- Botswana
- Eswatini
- Lesotho
- Madagascar
- Malawi
- Mozambique
- Namibia
- South Africa
- Zambia
- Zimbabwe

=== West Africa ===
The West Africa regional chapter consists of 16 countries (31% of APS Country Chapters) Its territory is composed entirely of land from West Africa representing affairs of planning professionals in the region. The West Africa regional chapter has 1 permanent seat on APS Executive council and 16 seats on the APS Chapters Council. The regional chapter is responsible for electing a member who represents the region on the APS Executive council.

Country Chapters of the West Africa region are as follows:

- Benin
- Burkina Faso
- Cape Verde
- Côte d'Ivoire
- Gambia
- Ghana
- Guinea
- Guinea-Bissau
- Liberia
- Mali
- Mauritania
- Niger
- Nigeria
- Senegal
- Sierra Leone
- Togo

=== International Chapter ===
The International chapter of the African Planning Society comprises 4 sub-regions that are outside of the African region. The chapter is composed of territories: Asia, Europe, Latin America, North America, Australia and the Caribbean. The International regional chapter has one permanent seat on APS Executive council and 4 seats on the APS Chapters Council. The regional chapter is responsible for electing a member who represents the region on the APS Executive council.

Sub-regions of the International regional chapter are as follows:

- Asia and Pacific States
- Europe and Australia
- Latin America and the Caribbean
- North America

== Planning Affairs ==
Planning Affairs is a quarterly magazine of the African Planning Society. Published four times a year, the magazine covers issues that include urban planning, regional planning, new urbanism, urbanization, and Urban studies.

== See also ==
- African Urban Institute
- Urban planning in Africa
