= Diane Maclean =

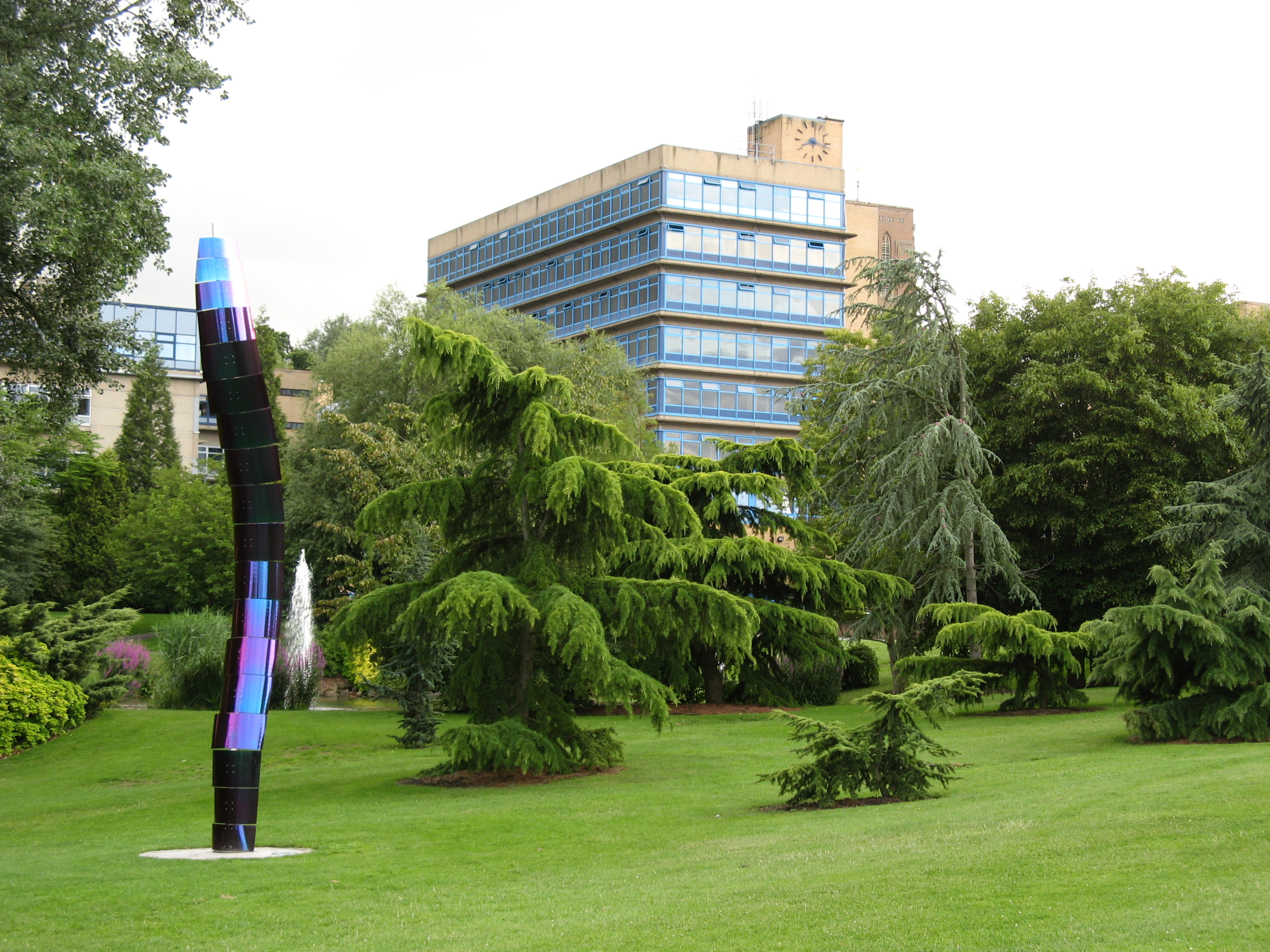
Spine 3, on the University of Surrey campus

Diane Maclean is a sculptor and environmental artist, she is a Fellow and council member of the Royal British Society of Sculptors.

Maclean gained a Bachelor of Arts in Fine Art from the University of Hertfordshire, having previously gained a BA in modern languages at University College London.

Originally a portrait painter, initially her sculptures tended to be in wood and stone, but much of her later work uses stainless steel.

== Commissions ==
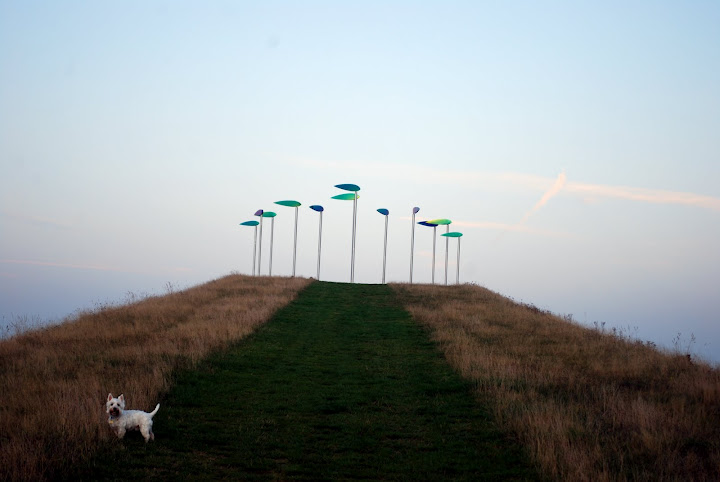
Green Wind, Ipswich

Maclean has been commissioned for a number of public art installations. Her sculpture Mountains was a stainless steel walk-through sculpture based on the growth of crystals and included recordings of geological sounds and mineral images from research at the Natural History Museum in London. The piece was displayed at the Natural History Museum in 2005 before moving to a permanent home at the University of Hertfordshire. Other commissions for pieces of public art, include Green Wind which stands as a focal feature in Ravenswood, Ipswich. Her one-person show Bird, commissioned by the DLI Museum and Durham Art Gallery, was a mixture of large-scale external sculptures and large-format photographs with text and sound installation at Durham County Council's North of England Lead Mining Museum at Killhope, upper Weardale.
