= Glensburg =

Urban planning company

Glensburg Pty Ltd
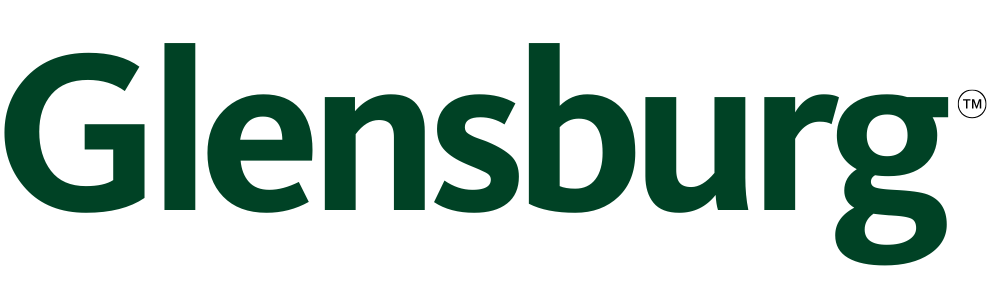
- Trade name: Glensburg Town Planners
- Company type: Private
- Industry: Urban planning; Architecture
- Founded: 2020; 6 years ago Johannesburg, South Africa.
- Headquarters: Illovo, Johannesburg, South Africa
- Number of locations: 2 Offices: Johannesburg Office; Cape Town Office
- Area served: Gauteng; Western Cape; KwaZulu-Natal
- Services: Urban planning; Architecture; Real Estate Development; Urban Strategies & Design
- Subsidiaries: Glensburg Cities Institute
- Website: glensburg.co.za

Glensburg (also known as Glensburg Town Planners) is a South African urban planning, architecture and development firm. Established in June 2020 following the restructuring of the African Urban Institute, the firm provides statutory town planning and land use management services across Gauteng, Western Cape, and KwaZulu-Natal. The firm is known for its research subsidiary, the Glensburg Cities Institute, which publishes the State of African Cities report.

== History ==
=== Origins and restructuring ===
The firm traces its origins to the then African Urban Institute (AUI), a think tank and advocacy organization established to address rapid urbanisation in African cities. In 2020, the organization underwent a strategic restructuring.The restructuring separated the organization's functions into two distinct entities:

- Glensburg Town Planners: A commercial consulting firm focusing on statutory planning, zoning, and architectural design.
- Glensburg Cities Institute: A non-profit research arm retaining the mandate of the former African Planning Society (APS).

=== Etymology ===
The name Glensburg is a portmanteau derived from Germanic toponymy, reflecting the firm's focus on human settlements: glen, derived from the Gaelic gleann, meaning a narrow valley; burg, derived from the Germanic burgh, denoting a fortress or walled town. In the context of South African town planning, the firm states that the name symbolizes a structured, resilient settlement (burg) integrated with the natural landscape (glen).

Glensburg Cities Institute produces a biennial State of African Cities report. It also publishes discussion papers, briefing papers and ViewPoints which are regular commentaries on urban development in Africa. The Glensburg Press Press publishes books and journals from the institute's own research as well as publishing work from other authors. The books include, Dystopia: How the Tyranny of Specialists Fragment African Cities, Cape to Cairo: To Race to Sustainable Urban Transport in Africa.

== Expertise ==
Glensburg operates primarily within the framework of the Spatial Planning and Land Use Management Act (SPLUMA) of 2013. The firm consults for private developers and municipal bodies in three key areas:

- Land use management: Facilitating applications for rezoning, township establishment, and removal of restrictive title deed conditions.
- Urban design: Drafting site development plans (SDPs) and precinct frameworks, with a focus on densification in nodes such as Rosebank, Gauteng.
- Development strategy: Conducting "Highest and Best Use" (HBU) analyses and due diligence for property acquisitions.

Glensburg frequently appears before Municipal Planning Tribunals (MPTs) in the City of Johannesburg and Ekurhuleni, representing developers in contested land use applications. The firm focuses on the interpretation of Chapter 2 of SPLUMA, specifically regarding the "development principles" of spatial justice and efficiency. The practice utilizes the tribunal system to secure development rights in cases where municipal bylaws may conflict with national SPLUMA directives, particularly concerning densification in transit-oriented nodes.

== Glensburg Cities Institute ==
The Glensburg Cities Institute (GCI), also known as Glensburg Institute, is the firm's non-profit research and philanthropic subsidiary. While Glensburg focuses on commercial town planning, the Institute functions as an independent think tank dedicated to urban policy and governance in Africa.

The Institute is best known for publishing the biennial State of African Cities report and convening the Timbuktu Forum on Urban Development. Its research, particularly on the "tyranny of specialists" in urban design, frequently informs the firm's commercial strategies regarding mixed-use developments and spatial integration. In June 2020, the Institute was formally separated from the commercial practice to ensure the independence of its policy advocacy work.

== See also ==
- Urban planning in Africa
