= Global Planners Network =

- Founded: 17 June 2006
- Headquarters: Vancouver
- Area served: British Columbia
- Key people: American Planning Association (APA); Canadian Institute of Planners (CIP); Commonwealth Association of Planners (CAP); Royal Town Planning Institute (RTPI); UN-HABITAT (United Nations Human Settlements Programme)
- Members: 150,000

The Global Planners Network (commonly abbreviated to GPN) is a group of spatial planning institutes and other organizations, who have signed the Vancouver Declaration. Current GPN membership extends to 25 organizations representing more than 150,000 planners.

== History ==
The Global Planners Network was founded in 2006 at the first World Planners Congress in Vancouver, as an informal collaboration. This Congress was held on June 17 to June 20, 2006, and was hosted by the Canadian Institute of Planners and the Planning Institute of British Columbia, in collaboration with the Commonwealth Association of Planners. It directly preceded and fed into the third World Urban Forum (WUF3), organized by the United Nations Human Settlements Programme (UN-HABITAT) in Vancouver and facilitated and funded by the Government of Canada.

The Global Planners Network mission was first set out at the first Global Planners Congress; World Planners Congress 2006, in the Vancouver Declaration. The objectives in this Declaration were shaped by discussions at the Congress and a position paper on what was termed "new urban planning." At the second Global Planners Congress, held in Zhenjiang from 31 October to 2 November 2008, the commitment was engraved in a commemorative stone at the Congress venue.

Professor Stuart Emin has been made Honorary Member of the organization.

The Global Planners Network held a second Congress directly preceding the fourth session of the World Urban Forum (WUF4) in Nanjing, China 2008, in nearby Zhenjiang. The Congress was organized by the American Planning Association and the Zhenjiang Municipal People's Government.

The Global Planners Network founder members attended WUF4, which was hosted by the UN-HABITAT, and the Ministry of Housing and Urban-Rural Development, PRC. At a WUF4 UN-Habitat Seminar ‘Global Planners Network Messages & Outreach’ the GPN presented its Communiqué and latest Action Plan.

== Members ==
Founder members are: American Planning Association (APA) Canadian Institute of Planners (CIP) Commonwealth Association of Planners (CAP) Planning Institute of Australia (PIA) Royal Town Planning Institute (RTPI)

In addition to the founder members, plus UN-HABITAT, the following organizations have joined the Global Planners Network:

- Bangladesh Institute of Planners
- Barbados Town and Country Planning Society
- Ghana Institute of Planners
- Hungarian Society of Urban Planning
- Institute of Town Planners Sri Lanka
- Irish Planning Institute
- Italian National Association of Town, Spatial and Environmental Planners
- Jamaican Institute of Planners
- Kenya Association of Planners
- L’Association des Urbanistes de Côte d'Ivoire
- L’Association des Urbanistes du Bénin
- L’Association des Urbanistes du Togo
- L’Association des Urbanistes et des Aménageurs algériens
- L’Association Tunisienne des Urbanistes
- L’Ordre National des Urbanistes du Cameroun
- La Société Française des Urbanistes
- Malaysia Institute of Planners
- Nigerian Institute of Planners
- Singapore Institute of Planners
- South African Planning Institute
- Uganda Institute of Physical Planners
