= Gerald Sutton-Brown =

Canadian government official

Gerald Sutton-Brown (1911–1985) was the first chief planner of Vancouver (1952–1959) and commissioner with the Board of Administration from 1960–1973. He influenced the trajectory of Vancouver's development at a critical time. His legacy includes the West End, increased density throughout the city and the walkways outside of Stanley Park like Coal Harbour and English Bay. He was instrumental in building the Queen Elizabeth Theater and founding the Planning Institute of British Columbia. His approach blended the UK's discretionary with the US's regulatory systems of development controls. He was fired in 1973 by the TEAM City Council, a decision which was opposed by the NPA and COPE councillors. Some regarded Sutton-Brown as the most powerful person in City Hall.

Born and raised in Jamaica and educated at the University of Southampton, Sutton-Brown served as the county planning officer for the County of Lancashire, the second largest county in the UK, which includes the cities of Manchester and Liverpool. After authoring the Preliminary Development Plan for Lancashire in July 1951, he was recruited to Vancouver and began work in October 1952. He died in 1985 in California.
