= Overseas Ministry (Portugal) =

Former government ministry of Portugal

- Ministério do Ultramar

Ministry overview
- Formed: 1911 (as Colonies Ministry)
- Preceding Ministry: Navy and Overseas Ministry
- Dissolved: 1974; 1975 (as Interterritorial Coordination Ministry); 1976 (as Cooperation Ministry)
- Jurisdiction: Portugal
- Headquarters: Lisbon
- Key document: Decreto da Assembleia Nacional Constituinte de 23 de agosto de 1911

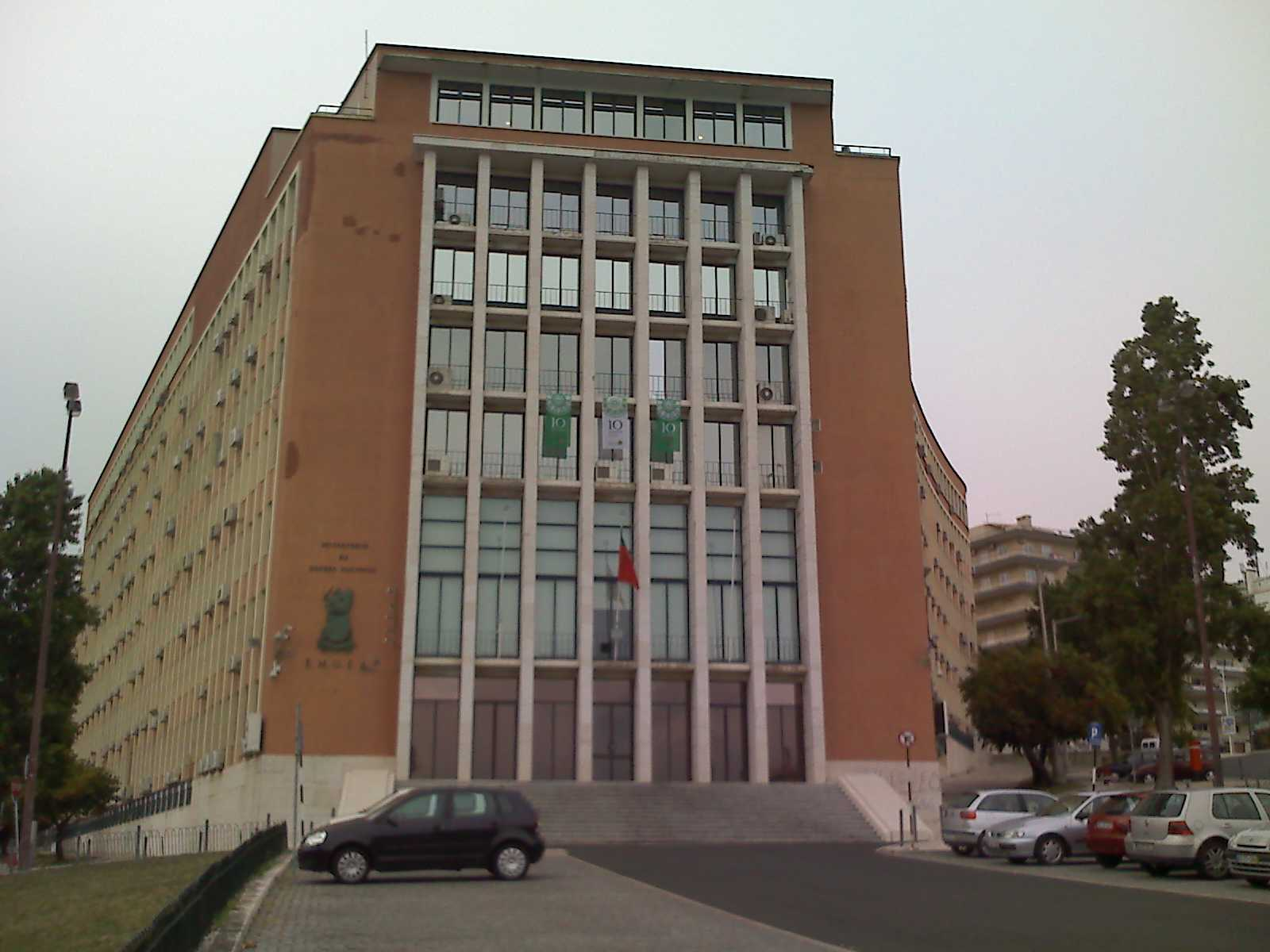
Former headquarters of the Portuguese Ministry of the Overseas, in Lisbon.

The Overseas Ministry (in Portuguese: Ministério do Ultramar) was the department of the Government of Portugal responsible for the administration of the overseas provinces.

In relation to the Portuguese Overseas territories, the Overseas Ministry had jurisdiction over almost all matters of government that, in the European Portugal, was divided into various ministries, including revenue and customs, economical affairs, internal security, public works, transports and communications, justice, civil administration, education, and public health. The ministry also had responsibilities in the external relations with neighboring areas of the Portuguese overseas territories and in the military affairs. The Overseas Minister superintended all governors-general and governors of the Portuguese Overseas.

The ministry had its origins in the Overseas and Navy Ministry (Ministério da Marinha e do Ultramar), established in 1736, by King John V of Portugal. In 1911, the colonial affairs were separated from the Navy Ministry, being created an autonomous Colonies Ministry (Ministério das Colónias). In 1951, the department was renamed "Overseas Ministry".

After the Carnation Revolution on 25 April 1974, the ministry continued to exist, provisionally, as the Interterritorial Coordination Ministry (Ministério da Coordenação Interterritorial), until the independence of the last Portuguese territories of Africa in 1975. From 1975, until its ultimate extinction in 1976, the structure of the ministry continued to function, first as the Secretariat of State for the Decolonization (Secretaria de Estado da Descolonização) and then as the Cooperation Ministry (Ministério da Cooperação).

== See also ==
- List of Colonial and Overseas ministers of Portugal, 1911–1976
- Arquivo Histórico Ultramarino, archives administered by the ministry 1931–1973
- Gabinete de Urbanização Colonial, urban planning office, 1944–1974
- List of ministries of Portugal
