= Secretary (title) =

Leader or chief officer of an organisation

Secretary is a title often used in organizations to indicate a person having a certain amount of authority, power, or importance in the organization. Secretaries announce important events and communicate to the organization. The term is derived from the Latin word secernere, "to distinguish" or "to set apart", the passive participle (secretum) meaning "having been set apart", with the eventual connotation of something private or confidential, as with the English word secret. A secretarius was a person, therefore, overseeing business confidentially, usually for a powerful individual (a king, pope, etc.).

The official title of the leader of most communist and socialist political parties is the "General Secretary of the Central Committee" or "First Secretary of the Central Committee". When a communist party is in power, the general secretary is usually the country's de facto leader (though sometimes this leader also holds state-level positions to monopolize power, such as a presidency or premiership in order to constitute de jure leadership of the state), such as China, North Korea, Vietnam, Laos and Cuba.

In England, the term secretarius was used "from the beginning of the thirteenth century in the varying meanings of a confidential clerk, an ambassador, or a member of the king's council". In the fourteenth century, the title became strongly associated with the keeper of the king's signet. From the Renaissance to the late 19th century, men involved in the daily correspondence and the activities of the powerful assumed the title of secretary. With time, like many titles, the term was applied to more and varied functions, leading to compound titles to specify the authority associated with its use, like general secretary or financial secretary.

In some countries, such as the United States, the term secretary is used to indicate the holder of a cabinet-level post. There are a number of popular variations of the title used to indicate that the secretary in question has a high degree of authority, such as general secretary (or, following usage in the Norman language, secretary-general), first secretary, and executive secretary. A woman holding such an office is often addressed informally as "Madam Secretary".

In a club or society, the secretary is also considered to be, in most cases, the third person in charge of the organization, after the president/chairman and vice president/vice chairman. In smaller organizations, the secretary typically takes meeting minutes, notifies members of meetings, contacts various persons in relation to the society, administers the day-to-day activities of the organization, and creates the order of business. The secretary of a non-governmental organization or international non-governmental organization can combine the function with that of vice president/vice chairman.

Some legislative clerks in the upper house of United States state legislatures, among other places, may have the title "secretary" (see also "secretary general", below)

== General secretary ==
General secretary occurs as the title of a ministerial position of authority found in various organizations, such as trade unions, communist and socialist parties, and international non-governmental organizations. Examples include:

- General Secretary of the Trades Union Congress
- General Secretary of the New South Wales Labor Party (Australia)
- Some church organizations, such as the National Council of Churches and the World Council of Churches
- General Secretary of the Labour Party

=== Communist Party ===
General secretary or first secretary is the official title of leaders of most Communist political parties. When a Communist party is the ruling party in a communist state, the general secretary is typically the country's de facto leader. Examples include:

- General Secretary of the Chinese Communist Party
- General Secretary of the Communist Party of Vietnam
- General Secretary of the Communist Party of Cuba
- General Secretary of the Lao People's Revolutionary Party
- General Secretary of the Workers' Party of Korea
- General Secretary of the Communist Party of the Soviet Union
- General Secretary of the Communist Party of Kampuchea
- General Secretary of the Mongolian People's Party
- General Secretary of the League of Communists of Yugoslavia
- General Secretary of the Socialist Unity Party of East Germany
- General Secretary of the Communist Party of Czechoslovakia
- General Secretary of the Party of Labour of Albania
- General Secretary of the Romanian Communist Party
- General Secretary of the Hungarian Socialist Workers' Party
- General Secretary of the Polish United Workers' Party
- General Secretary of the Bulgarian Communist Party

=== Dravidian Party ===
General secretary is the official title of leaders of most Dravidian political parties, that are politically influential in Tamil Nadu of Southern India. Examples include:

- General Secretary of the All India Anna Dravida Munnetra Kazhagam
- General Secretary of the Dravida Munnetra Kazhagam
- General Secretary of the Marumalarchi Dravida Munnetra Kazhagam
- General Secretary of the Desiya Murpokku Dravida Kazhagam

== Secretary-general ==
Examples include:

=== International organizations ===
Organization	Title
African Planning Society (APS)	Secretary-General of the African Planning Society
Association of Southeast Asian Nations (ASEAN)	Secretary-General of ASEAN
Caribbean Community (CARICOM)	Secretary-General of the Caribbean Community
Commonwealth of Nations	The Commonwealth Secretary-General is the de facto leader. The secretary-general advises member nations and heads conferences with the Head of the Commonwealth, currently King Charles III.
Council of Europe (COE)	Secretary General of the Council of Europe
Council of the European Union	Secretary-General of the Council of the European Union
European Commission	Secretary-General of the European Commission
European Court of Auditors	Secretary-General of the European Court of Auditors
European Economic and Social Committee	Secretary-General of the European Economic and Social Committee
INTERPORTPOLICE	Secretary General of the INTERPORTPOLICE
League of Nations (1919–1946)	Secretary General of the League of Nations
North Atlantic Treaty Organization (NATO)	The Secretary General of NATO is the chief administrative officer of NATO.
Organisation for Economic Co-operation and Development (OECD)	Secretary-General of the OECD
Organisation of Islamic Cooperation (OIC)	Secretary General of the Organisation of Islamic Cooperation
Organization of American States (OAS)	Secretary General of the Organization of American States
Organization of the Petroleum Exporting Countries (OPEC)	Secretary General of the Organization of the Petroleum Exporting Countries
Pacific Islands Forum	Secretary General of the Pacific Islands Forum Secretariat
Union of South American Nations (UNASUR)	Secretary General of the UNASUR
United Nations (UN)	The Secretary-General of the United Nations is described as the chief administrative officer and the de facto head of the United Nations. The Office of the Secretary-General of the United Nations hires, terminates, and controls all United Nations staff and relief efforts around the World.
Western European Union (WEU)	Secretary-General of the Western European Union

=== Others ===
Some legislative clerks also called "secretary general".

== First secretary ==
First secretary is the title of the chief officer or leader in many organizations, and is also a modern diplomatic rank. Examples include:

- Some consumer organizations, such as the National Consumers League
- Some political parties, especially Communist or Socialist Parties
- In Workers' Party and Communist Party organizations:
  - First Secretary of the Communist Party of Armenia
  - First Secretary of the Communist Party of Azerbaijan
  - First Secretary of the Chinese Communist Party—see Party Committee Secretary
    - First Secretary of the Communist Youth League of China
  - First Secretary of the Communist Party of Cuba
  - First Secretary of the Communist Party of Czechoslovakia
  - First Secretary of the French Socialist Party
  - First Secretary of the Georgian Communist Party
  - First Secretary of the Communist Party of Lithuania
  - First Secretary of the Polish United Workers' Party
  - First Secretary of the Communist Party of the Russian Federation
  - First Secretary of the Communist Party of the Soviet Union
    - First Secretary of the Moscow City Committee of the Communist Party of the Soviet Union
  - First Secretary of the Communist Party of Tajikistan
  - First Secretary of the Communist Party of Ukraine
  - First Secretary of the Workers' Party of Vietnam
- First Secretary of State, a cabinet position in the United Kingdom
- First Secretary for Wales, now First Minister of Wales
- First Secretary of the Admiralty—see Secretary to the Admiralty
- Some trade unions, especially in the United Kingdom
- The General Secretariat for Macedonia and Thrace, a government agency for the Greek regions of Macedonia and Thrace

== Executive secretary ==
Examples include:

- Executive Secretary (Commonwealth of Independent States)
- Executive Secretary (Philippines)
- Executive Secretary for Integral Development, Organization of American States
- Executive Secretary of the United States Department of State

== Secretary-treasurer ==
Within some organizations, the role of secretary is combined with that of treasurer, under the title of secretary-treasurer.

== See also ==
- Cabinet secretary / department secretary
- Legal secretary
- Permanent secretary
- Secretary
- Secretary of state
- Undersecretary
