= Planning Institute of British Columbia =

The Planning Institute of British Columbia (PIBC) is an association of professional planners in British Columbia and the Yukon, and is an affiliate of the Canadian Institute of Planners (CIP). PIBC members work in the public service and the private sector, in a wide variety of fields including land use planning, environmental resource management, land development, heritage conservation, social planning, transportation planning and economic development.

== Overview ==
PIBC was formed in 1954 by City of Vancouver Director of Planning, Gerald Sutton-Brown. Sutton-Brown's leadership, assisted significantly by the efforts of Tom McDonald of the Community Planning Association Canada (CPAC), helped to establish an organisation that remains central to the profession of planning in British Columbia to this day. In 2006 the institute hosted the World Planners Congress in Vancouver together the Canadian Institute of Planners and the Commonwealth Association of Planners. In 2021, the President of the Institute was Lesley Cabott.

== Governance ==
The Institute is governed by a Council of elected volunteers and consists of eleven voting members, elected every two years. The Council is composed of eight Full, Fellow, or Retired Members, one Provisional Member representative, and three student representatives (one from each Recognized Planning School/Program in B.C and the Yukon). The President and Vice-President are elected by and from the Council following each bi-annual election. Council also appoints the officers, committee chairs, and other volunteer representative positions of the Institute.

== See also ==
- American Institute of Certified Planners
- American Planning Association
- Global Planners Network
- Planning Institute of Australia
- Royal Town Planning Institute
