= Israel Planners Association =

Israel Planners Association (IPA) (Hebrew: איגוד המתכננים בישראל, Igud HaMetakhnenim BeYisra'el) is an Israeli organization that represents all those engaged in urban and regional planning in Israel. It is a member of International Society of City and Regional Planners.

== Overview ==
The Israel Planners Association was founded in 1965 and represents those engaged in urban and regional planning in the country, whether they are from the private, public or academic sector. The association is the only professional non-government body recognized by the Ministry of the Interior. Its members consult local, regional and national planning committees, and are responsible for approving National Outline Plans, local zoning plans, etc. Members of the association include engineers, city planners, geographers, architects, economists, sociologists, public policy experts, statisticians and more. The association's activities include study sessions, professional conferences and a newsletter.
