= Town Planners Registration Council =

- Abbreviation: TOPREC
- Formation: January 1988; 38 years ago
- Type: Government body
- Purpose: Administrative
- Region served: Nigeria
- President: Isyaku Mukhtar Kura
- Website: Official website

The Town Planners Registration Council of Nigeria (TOPREC) is the government body established by General Ibrahim Babangida's regime through its Decree 3 of 1988 (the "Town Planners Registration Decree"), which became an Act of Parliament in 2004. The council was established to protect, regulate, and control the practice of the profession of urban and regional planning in all aspects throughout Nigeria.

The council inducted 321 newly registered town planners at its 29th induction training workshop in Abuja in 2016. The council in 2017 criticised how the resettlement of displaced persons affected by the Boko Haram insurgency in northeastern Nigeria was being handled by the federal government and the affected states. It claimed the operation was unplanned and poorly coordinated.
