= Nigerian Institute of Town Planners =

Urban and regional panning body in Nigeria

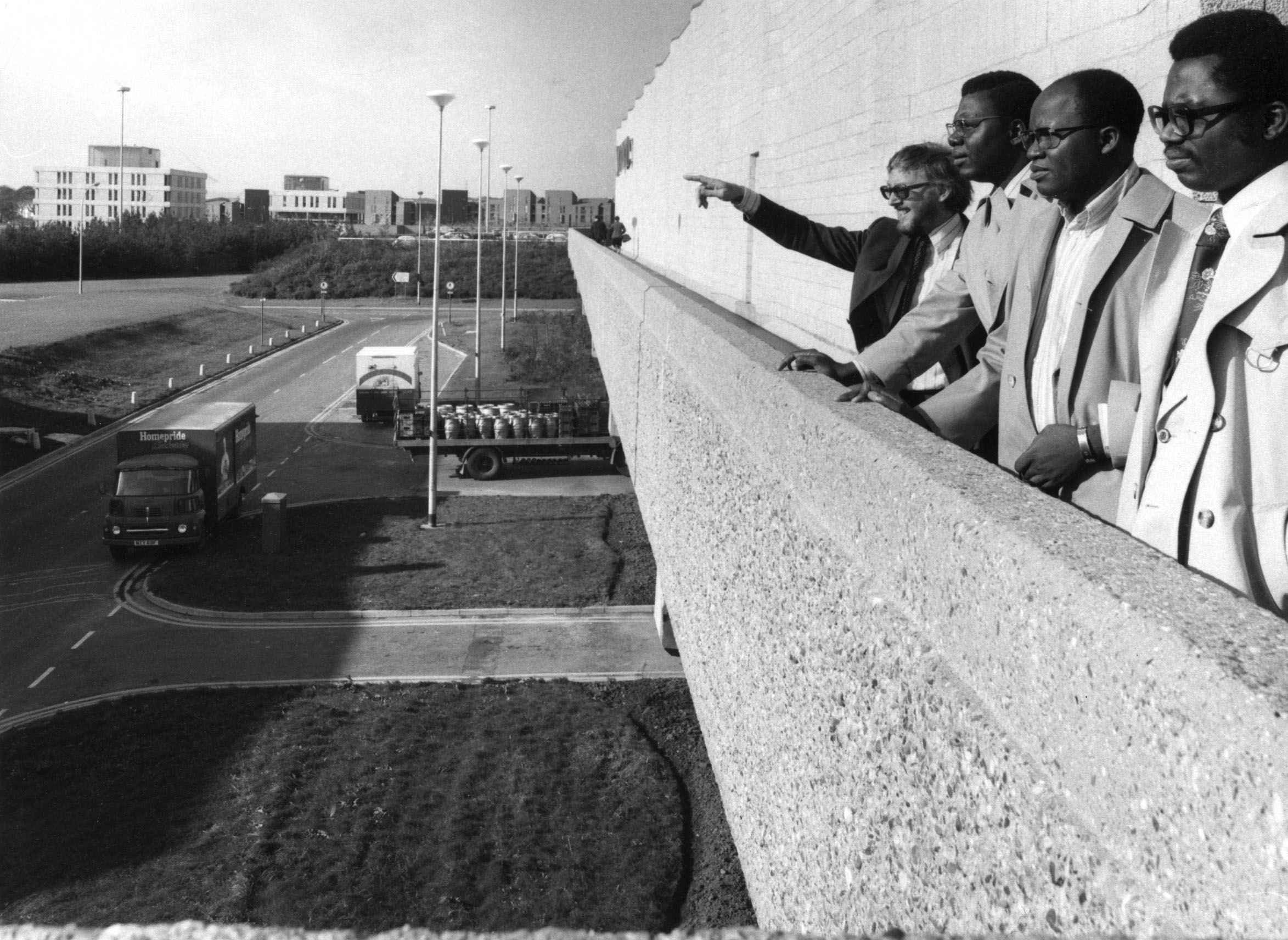
- Members of the institute visiting Washington, Tyne and Wear, England in 1976
- Abbreviation: NITP
- Formation: 1966
- Legal status: Active
- Headquarters: Abuja
- Region served: Nigeria
- Official language: English
- President: Nathaniel Atebije
- Website: NITP official website

The Nigerian Institute of Town Planners (NITP) is Nigeria's leading urban and regional planning body. The institute exists to advance the art and science of planning for the interests of the country.

The institute was formed on September 5, 1966, by 30 pioneer town planners in Lagos.

== Notable members ==
- Darius Ishaku
