= Killhope =

Village in Weardale, England

Coordinates: 54.7797°N 2.2707°W

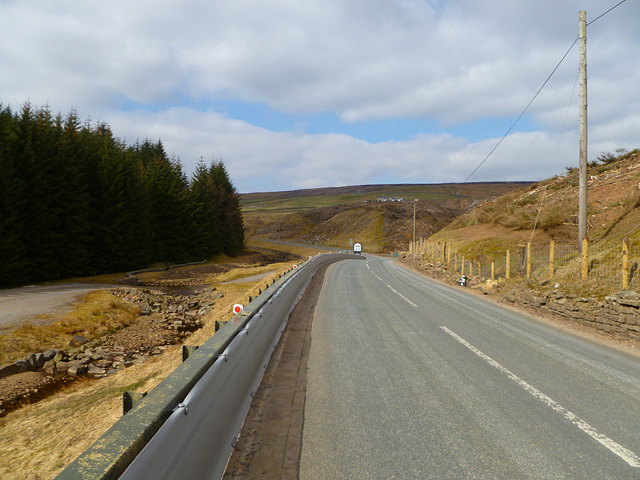
- Passing through Killhope

- Location within County Durham
- Civil parish: Stanhope
- Unitary authority: County Durham
- Ceremonial county: County Durham
- Region: North East
- Country: England
- Sovereign state: United Kingdom
- Post town: Bishop Auckland
- Postcode district: DL13
- UK Parliament: Bishop Auckland

Killhope is a small settlement at the very highest end of Weardale in the civil parish of Stanhope, in County Durham, England. Killhope Pass, on the A689 road linking Killhope to Nenthead in Cumbria, reaches 627 metres (2,057 ft) above sea level. This makes it the highest paved public A road in the UK.

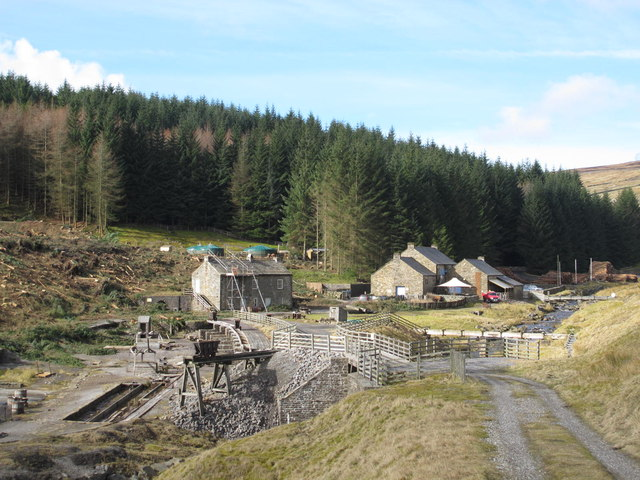
Killhope Lead Mine

The village is home of the North of England Lead Mining Museum which is based at the old Park Head Mine.

Killhope Burn, one of two major tributaries for the upper river Wear, flows eastwards through it.
