= Canadian Institute of Planners =

Canadian organization

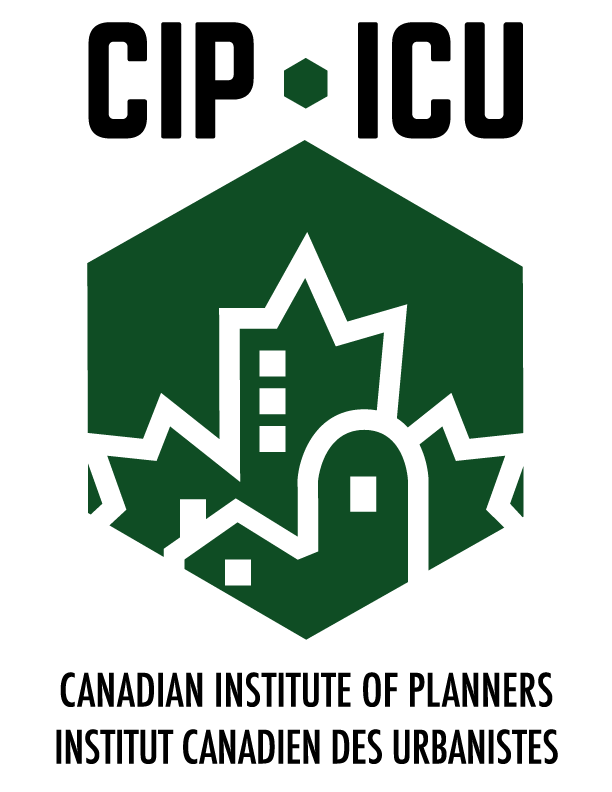
- Abbreviation: CIP
- Formation: 1919; 107 years ago
- Legal status: Active
- Headquarters: Ottawa, Ontario
- Region served: Canada
- Official language: English, French
- Website: www.cip-icu.ca

The Canadian Institute of Planners (CIP) is a professional organization in Canada for those involved in land use planning. It is responsible for advocating at national and international levels for members, developing public policy positions, and providing services to members. The Institute has over 8,000 members from across Canada and around the world, and works closely with the eleven Provincial and Territorial Institutes and Associations (PTIAs). It was founded in 1919.

The Institute plays an active role in defining the planning profession and working toward more sustainable communities. The Institute defines planning as a discipline which addresses "the use of land, resources, facilities and services in ways that secure the physical, economic and social efficiency, health and well-being of urban and rural communities." This definition provides a national focus and unity for the profession, while clearly illustrating the need for planners to work towards sustainability in urban and regional developments.

As the national body for planning, the Institute also provides codes of conduct and practice for planners, as well as numerous resources on current trends in planning and allied professions.

== Membership ==
=== Categories of Membership ===
==== Professional Membership ====
This membership category is reserved for planners who have been certified by a provincial/territorial body that governs planning as a Registered Professional Planner, Licensed Professional Planner, Urbaniste, or equivalent. Planners who live outside of Canada, or have been licensed by a reciprocal organization, are eligible for an international version of this class.

Professional members are the only class entitled to use the professional designation MCIP (Member of the Canadian Institute of Planners). This designation is a registered trademark, only available to professional planners in good standing.

==== Candidate Membership ====
This membership category is reserved for individuals who are in the process of pursuing full membership – usually possessing an eligible degree from the Professional Standards Board, but completing work experience requirements or exams.

==== Student Membership ====
This membership category is available to students enrolled full-time in post-secondary educational institutions, with accredited students (those enrolled in recognized planning programs) also eligible to be voting members.

==== Retired & Non-Practicing Membership ====
This membership category is available to members who are on leave from regular employment, or to professional members who have fully retired from the planning profession and left in good standing.

==== Public Membership ====
This membership category is available to members of the public who may have an interest in Canadian professional planning, but who do not qualify for other categories.

=== Membership Benefits ===
The primary benefit to full/professional members is the use of the MCIP designation and seal. The designation demonstrates to clients, the public, and employers that a planner meets all professional standards and is part of a profession. Professional and Candidate members are also automatically enrolled in a professional liability insurance program.

A large part of the work that CIP does is advocating for the planning profession and the value of planning. The Institute lobbies the federal government and other stakeholders to influence public policy. To educate members and the public, CIP regularly hosts events like World Town Planning Day seminars and its annual national conference. It also regularly hosts online and in-person workshops and training seminars on current issues in planning.

To encourage student involvement in planning, the institute offers numerous scholarships and bursaries to those enrolled in planning programs through the CIP/ICU Planning Student Trust Fund. Four scholarships and seven bursaries are disbursed annually, totalling $46,000 in support to students.

== Member benefits ==
Other member services and benefits include:

- a quarterly magazine entitled Plan Canada
- free subscription to Zoning Trilogy
- annual honours and awards program to acknowledge planning excellence
- annual national conference
- access to the Continuous Professional Learning (CPL) HUB
- online information and services

== Reciprocity ==
The Canadian Institute of Planners maintains reciprocal agreements with the American Planning Association and the Planning Institute of Australia. These official agreements mean planners with certification in one jurisdiction can easily transfer their certification to another, and begin practicing there.

== Provincial and Territorial Institutes and Associations ==
The Institute represents planning solely at the national level, and works closely with the independent Provincial and Territorial Institutes and Associations (PTIA). Regulation of the profession and certification of members are the purview of PTIAs, as the Canadian Constitution places the regulation of professions within provincial control. While no longer incorporated together, the PTIAs and the Institute function together to regulate, represent, and advocate for planning in Canada.

Eleven PTIAs exist in Canada:

- Atlantic Planners Institute
- Newfoundland and Labrador Association of Professional Planners
- Licensed Professional Planners Association of Nova Scotia
- Prince Edward Island Institute of Professional Planners
- New Brunswick Association of Planners
- Ordre des urbanistes du Québec
- Ontario Professional Planners Institute
- Manitoba Professional Planners Institute
- Saskatchewan Professional Planners Institute
- Alberta Professional Planners Institute
- Planning Institute of British Columbia

== See also ==
- American Institute of Certified Planners
- American Planning Association
- Commonwealth Association of Planners
- Global Planners Network
- Planning Institute of Australia
- Royal Town Planning Institute
