= Sedimentary basins of Britain and Ireland =

The sedimentary basins of Britain and Ireland are numerous, occurring beneath both the land surface of these islands and the surrounding seas. Sedimentary basins (not to be confused with drainage basins) have operated in this region over much of geological time from the Precambrian to the present day, typically accepting sediment from neighbouring areas where erosion is taking place, over timescales variously from millions to hundreds of millions of years. They may be referred to simply as basins or else as troughs, grabens or half-grabens, according to their mode of formation and morphology.

== Key to table ==
- Column 1 indicates the name of the basin. Some variant names are recorded between sources. Sub-basins are noted.
- Column 2 indicates the area (country/sea) in which the basin occurs. Some extend across more than one. Sea areas include the Atlantic Ocean, North Sea, English Channel, Sea of the Hebrides, Irish Sea, Celtic Sea, Bristol Channel, The Minch
- Column 3 indicates the period(s) or epoch(s) during which it was active as a sediment sink. May not be exhaustive.
- Column 4 provides any additional notes
- Column 5 indicates a selection of publications in which references to the basin may be found. See references section for full details of publication.

Sortable table of sedimentary basins
Basin name	Country/sea	Period active	Notes	Reference/s
Anglian Basin				
Anglo-Dutch Basin	North Sea			BGS Tm
Anglo-Welsh Basin	Wales, England	Devonian		
Arfon Basin	Wales			B&R36-7
Ayrshire Basin	Scotland			
Badbea Basin	Scotland	Devonian		T229
Banff Sub-basin	North Sea			BGS Tm
Blackstones Basin	Sea of the Hebrides	Oligocene		T370
Bovey Basin	England			B&R
Bowland Basin	England	Carboniferous		
Bratch Graben	England	Permian, Triassic		
Bristol Channel Basin	Bristol Channel, England, Wales			BGS Tm
Canna Basin	Sea of the Hebrides			BGS Tm
Cardigan Bay Basin	Irish Sea			BGS Tm
Cardington Sub-basin				B&R54
Carlisle Basin	England, Scotland			B&R
Celtic Sea Basin	Celtic Sea			B&R
Central Coalfield Basin	Scotland	Carboniferous		
Central English Channel Basin	English Channel			BGS Tm
Central Irish Sea Basin	Irish Sea			BGS Tm
Central North Sea Basin	North Sea	Carboniferous		T259
Central Pennine Basin	England			B&R
Central Viking Graben	North Sea			BGS Tm
Cheshire Basin	England	Permian, Triassic, Jurassic		BGS Tm
Clare Basin	Atlantic Ocean, Ireland			BGS Tm
Cleaver Bank Basin				B&R390
Cleveland Basin	England, North Sea	Carboniferous, Jurassic, Cretaceous		BGS Tm
Clyde Basin	Scotland	Permian		T317
Cockburn Basin	Celtic Sea			BGS Tm
Coll Basin	Sea of the Hebrides			BGS Tm
Colonsay Basin	Sea of the Hebrides			BGS Tm
Corrieyairack Basin	Scotland	Neoproterozoic		T97,99
Craighead Basin	Scotland	Ordovician		T156
Craven Basin	England			
Crediton Trough	England			BGS Tm, B&R290
Cressage Sub-basin	England			B&R54
Cromdale Basin		Neoproterozoic		T97,99
Culm Trough	England			
Dalry Basin	Scotland	Carboniferous		T273
Denbigh Trough	Wales			B&R
Donegal Basin	Atlantic Ocean			BGS Tm
Dorset Sub-basin	England			BGS Tm
Douglas Basin				
Dumfries Basin	Scotland	Permian		T316-7
Dutch Bank Basin	North Sea			BGS Tm
East Central Graben	North Sea			BGS Tm
East Fair Isle Basin	North Sea			
East Irish Sea Basin	Irish Sea			BGS Tm
East Orkney Basin	North Sea			BGS Tm
East Shetland Basin	North Sea			BGS Tm
East Solan Basin		Triassic		BGS Tm, T321
Edale Basin	England		Edale Gulf on BGS Tm	BGS Tm
Erris Basin	Atlantic Ocean			BGS Tm
Faroe-Shetland Basin	Atlantic Ocean	Cretaceous, Palaeogene, Neogene		BGS Tm, T363-4
Fastnet Basin	Celtic Sea			BGS Tm
Fetlar Basin	North Sea			BGS Tm
Fife Basin				
Fisher Bank Basin	North Sea			BGS Tm
Fishguard-Cardigan Trough	Wales			B&R65
Flannan Trough	Atlantic Ocean			BGS Tm
Flett Sub-basin	Atlantic Ocean			BGS Tm
Flimston Basin				B&R425
Forth Approaches Basin	North Sea			BGS Tm
Gainsborough Trough	England			BGS Tm
Gramscatho Basin	England			B&R
Haig Fras Basin	Celtic Sea			BGS Tm
Hampshire Basin	England, English Channel	Paleogene		
Harrogate Basin	England			B&R
Hatton Basin				
Hinckley Basin	England	Permian, Triassic		
Inner Hebrides Trough	Scotland			
Inner Moray Firth Basin	Moray Firth			BGS Tm
Irish Sea Basin	Irish Sea			B&R464
Isle of Wight Basin	England			B&R318
Kincardine Basin	Scotland	Carboniferous		T274
Kish Bank Basin	Irish Sea			BGS Tm
Knowle Basin	England	Permian, Triassic		
Lake District Basin	England			
Lakesman Basin	England, Irish Sea			B&R
Leinster-Lakesman Basin	England, Ireland, Irish Sea			B&R26-8
Lancaster Fells Basin	England			
Leinster Basin	Ireland			
Leven Basin	Scotland	Carboniferous		T287
Little Minch Trough	The Minch	Carboniferous, Permian, Triassic		BGS Tm, T258
Loch Indaal Basin	Scotland	Permian, Triassic		BGS Tm, T318
Lochmaben Basin	Scotland	Permian		T316-7
London Basin	England	Paleogene		
Looe Basin	England			B&R248
Magnus Half-graben	Atlantic Ocean			BGS Tm
Magnus Trough	Atlantic Ocean			BGS Tm
Malin Basin	Sea of the Hebrides			BGS Tm
Mauchline Basin	Scotland	Permian		T317
Mell Fell Trough	England			B&R171
Melville Basin	Celtic Sea			BGS Tm
Midland Valley Graben / Midland Valley Basin	Scotland			BGS Tm
Midlothian Basin	Scotland			
Moffat Basin	Scotland	Permian		T316-7
Montgomery Trough	Wales, England			B&R101
Muirkirk Basin				
Munster Basin	Ireland			BGS Tm
Needwood Basin	England	Permian, Triassic		
North Celtic Sea Basin	Celtic Sea			BGS Tm
North Channel Basin / Portpatrick Basin	Irish Sea	Permian		BGS Tm, T317
North Lewis Basin	Atlantic Ocean			BGS Tm
North Minch Basin	The Minch			BGS Tm
Northern Rockall Trough	Atlantic Ocean			
North Rona Basin	Atlantic Ocean			BGS Tm
North Sea Basin	North Sea	Cretaceous, Palaeogene, Neogene		BGS Tm, T363-4
North Staffordshire Basin	England			
Northumberland-Solway Basin	England, Scotland, Irish Sea			
Northumberland Trough	England, North Sea	Carboniferous		BGS Tm
North Viking Graben	North Sea			BGS Tm
Oldhamstocks Basin / Oldhamstocks-Dunbar Basin	Scotland	Carboniferous		T253,265
Orcadian Basin	Scotland	Devonian		
Papa Basin	Atlantic Ocean			BGS Tm
Peel Basin	Irish Sea			BGS Tm
Pennine Basin	England			B&R
Petrockstow Basin	England			B&R425,427
Pewsey Sub-basin	England			BGS Tm
Plymouth Bay Basin	English Channel			BGS Tm
Porcupine Trough, Porcupine Basin	Atlantic Ocean	Triassic, Jurassic, Cretaceous, Cenozoic		BGS Tm, T338
Portland-Wight Basin / Sub-basin	English Channel			BGS Tm
Rathlin Trough	Northern Ireland, Malin Sea	Triassic		BGS Tm, T318
Rhynie Basin	Scotland	Devonian	see Rhynie Chert	BGS Tm, T226-7
Rockall Basin / Rockall Trough	Atlantic Ocean			BGS Tm
St George's Channel Basin	Irish Sea			BGS Tm
St Mary's Basin	English Channel			BGS Tm
Sandbach-Knutsford Sub-basin	England	Permian, Triassic		
Sandwick Basin	Atlantic Ocean			BGS Tm
Scarvister Sub-basin	Atlantic Ocean			BGS Tm
Sea of the Hebrides Trough	Sea of the Hebrides			BGS Tm
Severn Coal Basin	England			B&R221
Shelve Sub-basin	England			B&R
Slyne Trough / Slyne-Erris Trough	Atlantic Ocean	Jurassic		BGS Tm, T338
Sole Pit Trough	North Sea			BGS Tm
Solway Basin / Solway Firth	Irish Sea	Permian, Triassic		BGS Tm, T317
South Celtic Sea Basin	Celtic Sea			BGS Tm
South Devon Basin	England			B&R
South Wales Basin	Wales			B&R
South West Arran Trough	Scotland	Permian		T316
South West England Half-graben	England			B&R292
Stafford Basin	England	Permian, Triassic		
Stainmore Trough / Stainmore Basin	England			BGS Tm
Stanley Bank Basin	Bristol Channel			B&R, 425
Stanton Trough	Sea of the Hebrides			BGS Tm
Stirling-Clackmannan Basin	Scotland			
Stranraer Basin	Scotland	Permian		T317
Strathtummel Basin	Scotland	Neoproterozoic		T99
Thornhill Basin	Scotland	Permian		T316-7
Tiverton Trough	England			B&R290
Torridonian Basin	Scotland, The Minch	Proterozoic		BGS Tm, T71
Turriff Basin	Scotland	Devonian		T216,228
Tweed Basin	North Sea	Carboniferous		BGS Tm, T265
Ulster Basin	Northern Ireland			BGS Tm
Unst Basin	North Sea		two arms; NW and S	BGS Tm
Usk Sub-basin	Wales			B&R
Vale of Clwyd	Wales			
Vale of Eden Basin	England			B&R
Weald Basin	England			
Weald Sub-basin	England			BGS Tm
Welsh Basin	Wales			B&R
Wem-Audlem Sub-basin	England	Permian, Triassic, Jurassic		
Wessex Basin	England			BGS Tm
West Central Graben	North Sea			BGS Tm
West Fair Isle Basin	North Sea	Devonian		BGS Tm, T240
West Flannan Basin	Atlantic Ocean			BGS Tm
West Lewis Basin	Atlantic Ocean	Jurassic		BGS Tm, T341
West Lothian Basin	Scotland	Carboniferous		T262,264
West Orkney Basin Complex	Atlantic Ocean			BGS Tm
West Shetland Basin	Atlantic Ocean	Devonian		BGS Tm, T239
Western Approaches Trough	English Channel			BGS Tm
Widmerpool Gulf	England			BGS Tm,B&R
Widmerpool Half-graben	England			B&R196
Widnes Basin	England			
Witch Ground Graben	North Sea			BGS Tm
Woolhope Basin	England			B&R
Worcester Graben / Worcester Basin	England	Permian, Triassic		B&R

== See also ==
- Geological structure of Great Britain
- Gravity anomalies of Britain and Ireland
