= Gravity anomalies of Britain and Ireland =

Gravity variance in Britain and Ireland

Variations in the strength of gravity occur from place to place according to the density distribution of the rocks beneath the surface. Such gravity anomalies have been mapped across the British Isles and adjacent areas and they reveal aspects of these islands’ geological structure.

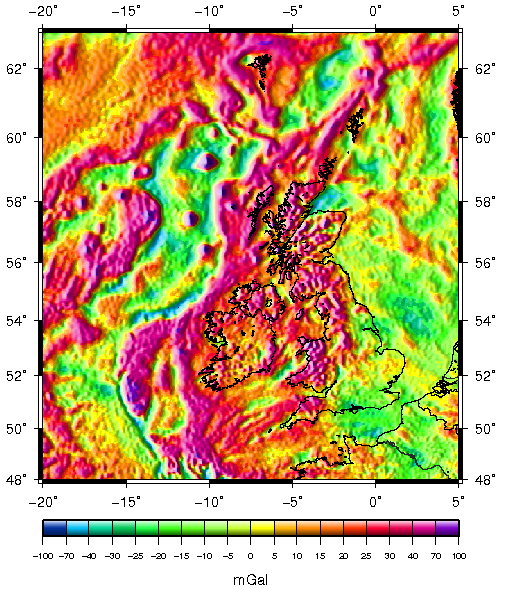
Map of free-air gravity anomalies around the British Isles

== Negative anomalies ==
Negative gravity anomalies are associated with local deficiencies in mass due to volumes of rock which are less dense than the average. Typically these anomalies are associated with granite plutons and with sedimentary basins. Gravity anomaly maps of the British Isles are interpreted as indicating the presence of granite plutons in the following areas. The list is not exhaustive:

- Galloway, UK
- Cheviot Hills, UK
- Mountains of Mourne, UK
- Connemara, Ireland
- County Donegal, Ireland
- South West England (Cornubian batholith and Haig Fras granite), UK
- Askrigg Block (Yorkshire Dales), UK
- Alston Block (North Pennines), UK
- Grampian Highlands (Cairngorms etc.), UK

The Weardale Granite, a batholith some 60 km (35 miles) by 25 km (15 miles) in extent underlying the Alston Block of the northern Pennines, was first detected by gravity survey. Drilling of the Rookhope borehole subsequently confirmed the existence of this substantial body of granite. A combination of gravity anomaly data and boreholes has permitted geologists to work out the shape of this pluton. A further borehole was drilled at Raydale to investigate the origin of the gravity anomaly underlying the Askrigg Block. This proved the existence of the Wensleydale granite - a body of rock which is nowhere exposed at the surface.

Similarly, negative anomalies coincide with the following sedimentary basins (amongst others):

- Moray Firth Basin
- North Channel Basin
- Solway Basin
- Kish Bank Basin
- Munster Basin
- Vale of Eden
- Vale of Clwyd
- Cheshire Basin
- Worcester Basin
- Hampshire Basin
- Cardigan Bay Basin
- St George's Channel Basin
- Wessex Basin
- Rockall Basin
- Porcupine Basin

The negative anomaly associated with the Worcester Basin/Graben has sharp margins and is particularly pronounced. Work by researchers, Cook and Thirlaway and also by Brooks in the 1950s and 1960s resulted in estimates of the thickness of the sedimentary rock sequence in the basin. Models for the structure of the basin are in part based on their interpretation of the gravity anomaly together with data from seismic surveys and a borehole at Kempsey.

The Lairg Gravity Low is suspected to be due to a buried impact crater 40 kilometres in diameter.

== Positive anomalies ==
Positive gravity anomalies are associated with areas where Precambrian basement rocks are at or near the surface or where volumes of basalt or other similarly dense rocks have been put in place. Intense gravity highs coincide with a series of Palaeogene volcanic centres associated with the opening of the Atlantic Ocean and including those at:

- Skye
- St Kilda
- Ardnamurchan
- Rùm
- Dubh Artach
- Isle of Mull
- Isle of Arran
- Lundy
- Anton Dohrn Seamount
- Rosemary Bank

The discovery of another volcanic centre, the wholly submarine Blackstones Bank Central Complex, was achieved through combining the results of magnetic, seismic and gravity surveys; its large positive gravity anomaly suggesting that it was a candidate site for further research.

In addition, intense gravity highs are associated with the Anton Dohrn and Hebrides Terrace seamounts. Gravity anomalies also accompany major lineaments, notably those associated with the Scottish Caledonides and including Great Glen Fault, Walls Boundary Fault, Highland Boundary Fault and Southern Uplands Fault.

== See also ==
- Sedimentary basins of Britain and Ireland
- Indian Ocean Geoid Low
