= Close House =

Close House may refer to:

- Close House, County Durham, a village in County Durham, England
- Close House (Iowa City, Iowa), an historic mansion in Iowa City, Iowa, United States
- Close House, Northumberland, a country estate in Northumberland, England

== See also ==
- Close House Mine, a Site of Special Scientific Interest in County Durham, England
