= History of County Durham =

English county history

The county of Durham in its modern borders.

The history of County Durham.

== Roman and pre-Roman ==
Remains of Prehistoric Durham; W Boyd Dawkins, "Notes on Durham, York and Manchester in Prehistoric Times: Prehistoric Durham, York and Manchester" (1909) The Archaeological Journal 171; Rosemary Annable, The Later Prehistory of Northern England: Cumbria, Northumberland, and Durham from the Neolithic to the Late Bronze Age, BAR British Series 160(1), 160(ii) and 160(iii), 1987, Parts, ii and iii; Robert Young, Lithics and Subsistence in North-eastern England: Aspects of the Prehistoric Archaeology of the Wear Valley, Co Durham, from the Mesolithic to the Bronze Age, include a number of Neolithic earthworks.

The Crawley Edge Cairns and Heathery Burn Cave are Bronze Age sites. Maiden Castle, Durham is an Iron Age site.

Brigantia, the land of the Brigantes, is said to have included what is now County Durham.

There are archaeological remains of Roman Durham. Dere Street and Cade's Road run through what is now County Durham. There were Roman forts at Concangis (Chester-le-Street), Lavatrae (Bowes), Longovicium (Lanchester), Piercebridge (Morbium), Vindomora (Ebchester) and Vinovium (Binchester). (The Roman fort at Arbeia (South Shields) is within the former boundaries of County Durham.) A Romanised farmstead has been excavated at Old Durham.

== Anglo-Saxon ==
Remains of the Anglo-Saxon period include a number of sculpted stones and sundials, the Legs Cross, the Rey Cross and St Cuthbert's coffin.

=== Anglian Kingdom of Bernicia ===
Around AD 547, an Angle named Ida founded the kingdom of Bernicia after spotting the defensive potential of a large rock at Bamburgh, upon which many a fortification was thenceforth built. Ida was able to forge, hold and consolidate the kingdom; although the native British tried to take back their land, the Angles triumphed and the kingdom endured.

=== Kingdom of Northumbria ===
In AD 604, Ida's grandson Æthelfrith forcibly merged Bernicia (ruled from Bamburgh) and Deira (ruled from York, which was known as Eforwic at the time) to create the Kingdom of Northumbria. In time, the realm was expanded, primarily through warfare and conquest; at its height, the kingdom stretched from the River Humber (from which the kingdom drew its name) to the Forth. Eventually, factional fighting and the rejuvenated strength of neighbouring kingdoms, most notably Mercia, led to Northumbria's decline. The arrival of the Vikings hastened this decline, and the Scandinavian raiders eventually claimed the Deiran part of the kingdom in AD 867 (which became Jórvík). The land that would become County Durham now sat on the border with the Great Heathen Army, a border which today still (albeit with some adjustments over the years) forms the boundaries between Yorkshire and County Durham.

Despite their success south of the river Tees, the Vikings never fully conquered the Bernician part of Northumbria, despite the many raids they had carried out on the kingdom. However, Viking control over the Danelaw, the central belt of Anglo-Saxon territory, resulted in Northumbria becoming isolated from the rest of Anglo-Saxon Britain. Scots invasions in the north pushed the kingdom's northern boundary back to the River Tweed, and the kingdom found itself reduced to a dependent earldom, its boundaries very close to those of modern-day Northumberland and County Durham. The kingdom was annexed into England in AD 954.

== City of Durham founded ==
In AD 995, St Cuthbert's community, who had been transporting Cuthbert's remains around, partly in an attempt to avoid them falling into the hands of Viking raiders, settled at Dunholm (Durham) on a site that was defensively favourable due to the horseshoe-like path of the River Wear. St Cuthbert's remains were placed in a shrine in the White Church, which was originally a wooden structure but was eventually fortified into a stone building.

Once the City of Durham had been founded, the Bishops of Durham gradually acquired the lands that would become County Durham. Bishop Aldhun began this process by procuring land in the Tees and Wear valleys, including Norton, Stockton, Escomb and Aucklandshire in 1018. In 1031, King Canute gave Staindrop to the Bishops. This territory continued to expand, and was eventually given the status of a liberty. Under the control of the Bishops of Durham, the land had various names: the "Liberty of Durham", "Liberty of St Cuthbert's Land" "the lands of St Cuthbert between Tyne and Tees" or "the Liberty of Haliwerfolc" (holy Wear folk).

The bishops' special jurisdiction rested on claims that King Ecgfrith of Northumbria had granted a substantial territory to St Cuthbert on his election to the see of Lindisfarne in 684. In about 883 a cathedral housing the saint's remains was established at Chester-le-Street and Guthfrith, King of York granted the community of St Cuthbert the area between the Tyne and the Wear, before the community reached its final destination in 995, in Durham.

Following the Norman invasion, the administrative machinery of government extended only slowly into northern England. Northumberland's first recorded Sheriff was Gilebert from 1076 until 1080 and a 12th-century record records Durham regarded as within the shire. However the bishops disputed the authority of the sheriff of Northumberland and his officials, despite the second sheriff for example being the reputed slayer of Malcolm Canmore, King of Scots. The crown regarded Durham as falling within Northumberland until the late thirteenth century.

== Norman and Anglo-Norman ==
Following the Battle of Hastings, William the Conqueror appointed Copsig as Earl of Northumbria, thereby bringing what would become County Durham under Copsig's control. Copsig was, just a few weeks later, killed in Newburn. Having already being previously offended by the appointment of a non-Northumbrian as Bishop of Durham in 1042, the people of the region became increasingly rebellious. In response, in January 1069, William despatched a large Norman army, under the command of Robert de Comines, to Durham City. The army, believed to consist of 700 cavalry (about one-third of the number of Norman knights who had participated in the Battle of Hastings), entered the city, whereupon they were attacked, and defeated, by a Northumbrian assault force. The Northumbrians wiped out the entire Norman army, including Comines, all except for one survivor, who was allowed to take the news of this defeat back.

Following the Norman slaughter at the hands of the Northumbrians, resistance to Norman rule spread throughout Northern England, including a similar uprising in York. William The Conqueror subsequently (and successfully) attempted to halt the northern rebellions by unleashing the notorious Harrying of the North (1069–1070). Because William's main focus during the harrying was on Yorkshire, County Durham was largely spared the Harrying.

Anglo-Norman Durham refers to the Anglo-Norman period, during which Durham Cathedral was built.

== County Palatine of Durham ==
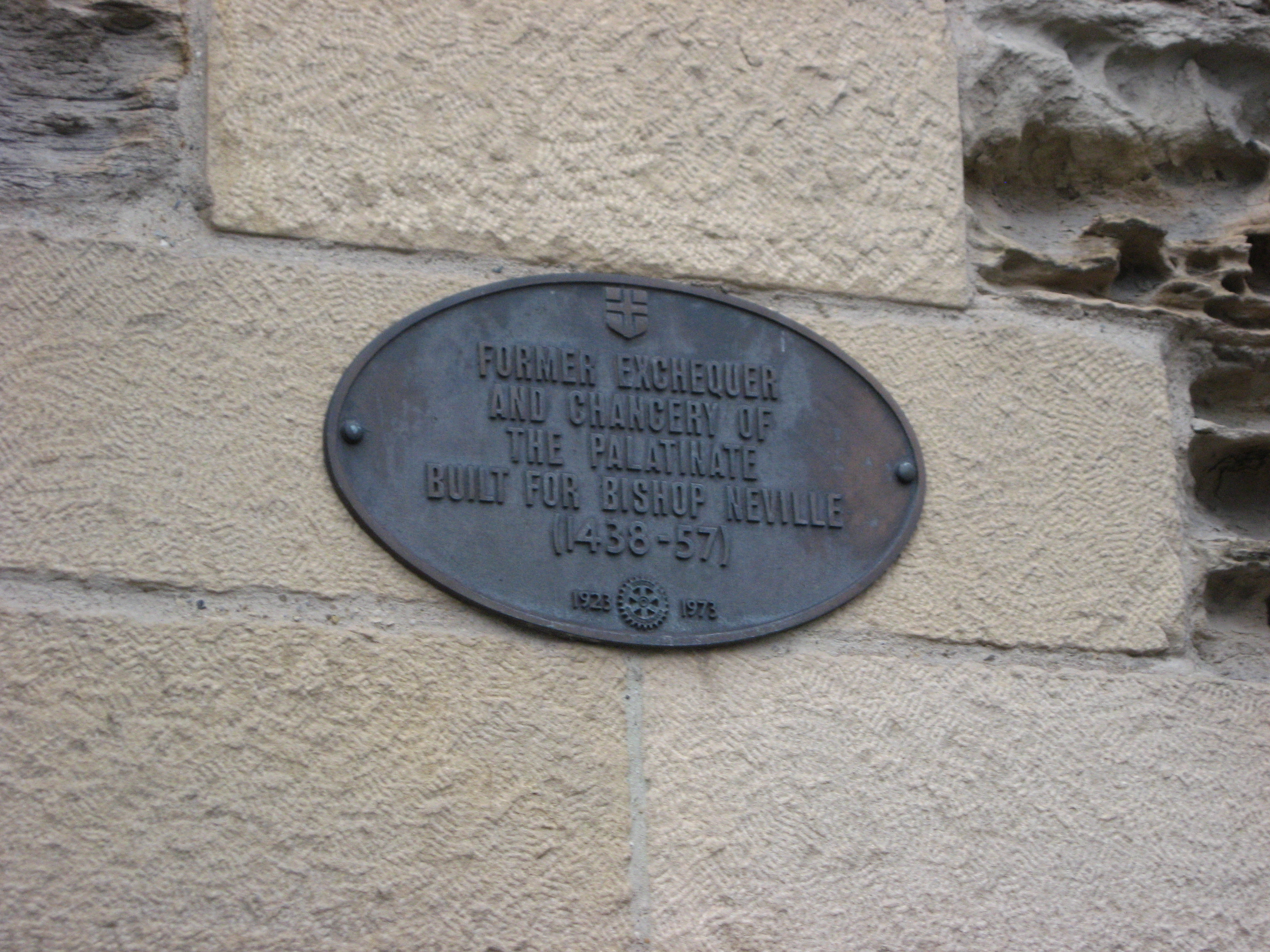
Durham palatinate plaque

Matters regarding the bishopric of Durham came to a head in 1293 when the bishop and his steward failed to attend proceedings of quo warranto held by the justices of Northumberland. The bishop's case went before parliament, where he stated that Durham lay outside the bounds of any English shire and that "from time immemorial it had been widely known that the sheriff of Northumberland was not sheriff of Durham nor entered within that liberty as sheriff. . . nor made there proclamations or attachments". The arguments appear to have prevailed, as by the fourteenth century Durham was accepted as a liberty which received royal mandates direct. In effect it was a private shire, with the bishop appointing his own sheriff. The area eventually became known as the "County Palatine of Durham".

Sadberge was a liberty, sometimes referred to as a county, within Northumberland. In 1189 it was purchased for the see but continued with a separate sheriff, coroner and court of pleas. In the 14th century Sadberge was included in Stockton ward and was itself divided into two wards. The division into the four wards of Chester-le-Street, Darlington, Easington and Stockton existed in the 13th century, each ward having its own coroner and a three-weekly court corresponding to the hundred court. The diocese was divided into the archdeaconries of Durham and Northumberland. The former is mentioned in 1072, and in 1291 included the deaneries of Chester-le-Street, Auckland, Lanchester and Darlington.

The term palatinus is applied to the bishop in 1293, and from the 13th century onwards the bishops frequently claimed the same rights in their lands as the king enjoyed in his kingdom.

== Early administration ==
=== Boundaries, exclaves and population ===
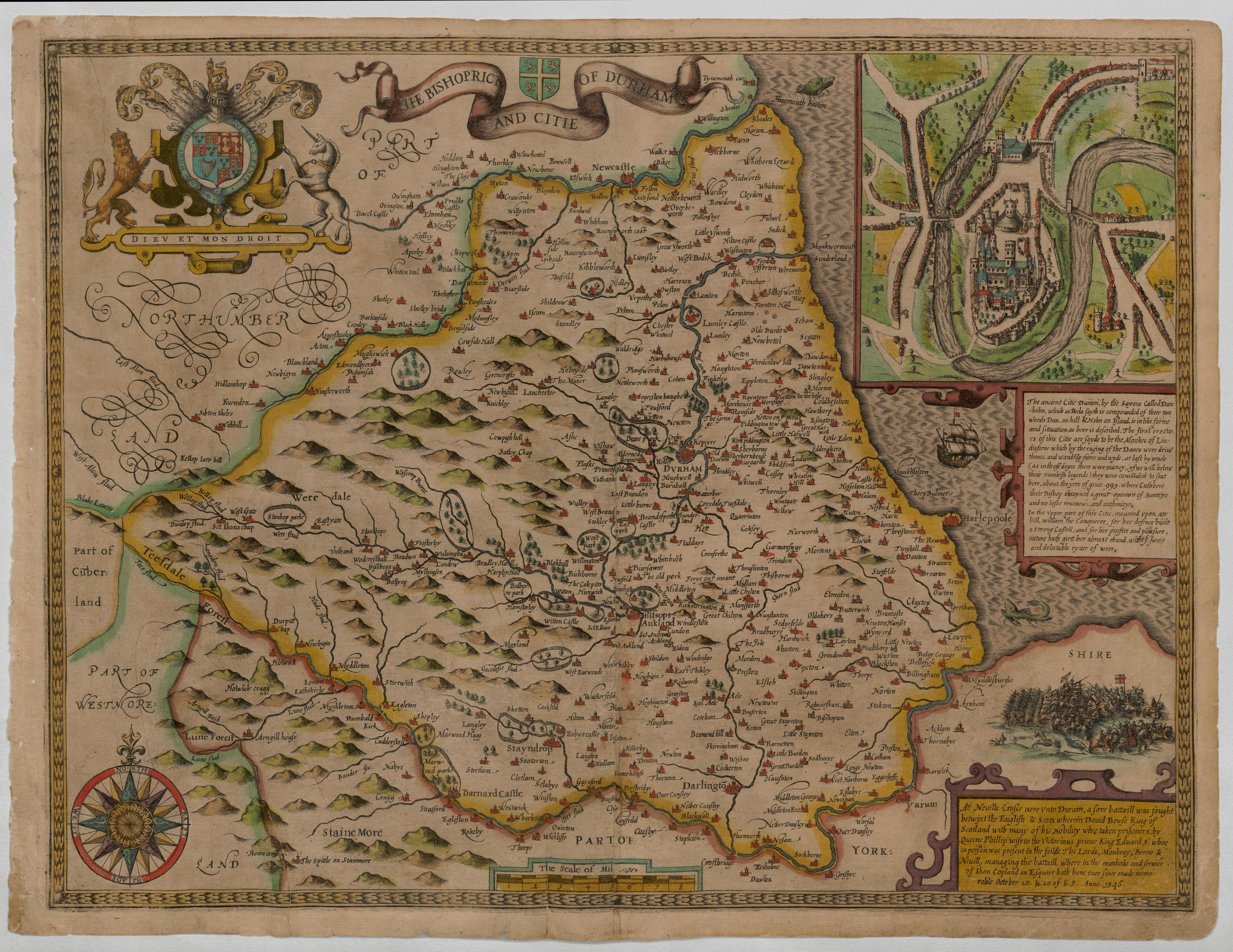
The historic boundaries of the county shown in John Speed's map of the county in his Theatre of the Empire of Great Britaine, c. 1611. These boundaries remained in use for administrative purposes until the local government reforms starting in the 1960s. A depiction of the city of Durham is inset in the top right.

The historic boundaries of County Durham included a main body covering the catchment of the Pennines in the west, the River Tees in the south, the North Sea in the east and the Rivers Tyne and Derwent in the north. The county palatinate also had a number of liberties: the Bedlingtonshire, Islandshire and Norhamshire exclaves within Northumberland, and the Craikshire exclave within the North Riding of Yorkshire. In 1831 the county covered an area of 679,530 acres (2,750.0 km^{2}) and had a population of 253,910. These exclaves were included as part of the county for parliamentary electoral purposes until 1832, and for judicial and local-government purposes until the coming into force of the Counties (Detached Parts) Act 1844, which merged most remaining exclaves with their surrounding county. The boundaries of the county proper remained in use for administrative and ceremonial purposes until the Local Government Act 1972.

=== Survey ===
Boldon Book (1183 or 1184) is a polyptichum for the Bishopric of Durham.

=== Palatinate ===
Until the 15th century, the most important administrative officer in the Palatinate was the steward. Other officers included the sheriff, the coroners, the Chamberlain and the chancellor. The palatine exchequer originated in the 12th century. The palatine assembly represented the whole county, and dealt chiefly with fiscal questions. The bishop's council, consisting of the clergy, the sheriff and the barons, regulated judicial affairs, and later produced the Chancery and the courts of Admiralty and Marshalsea.

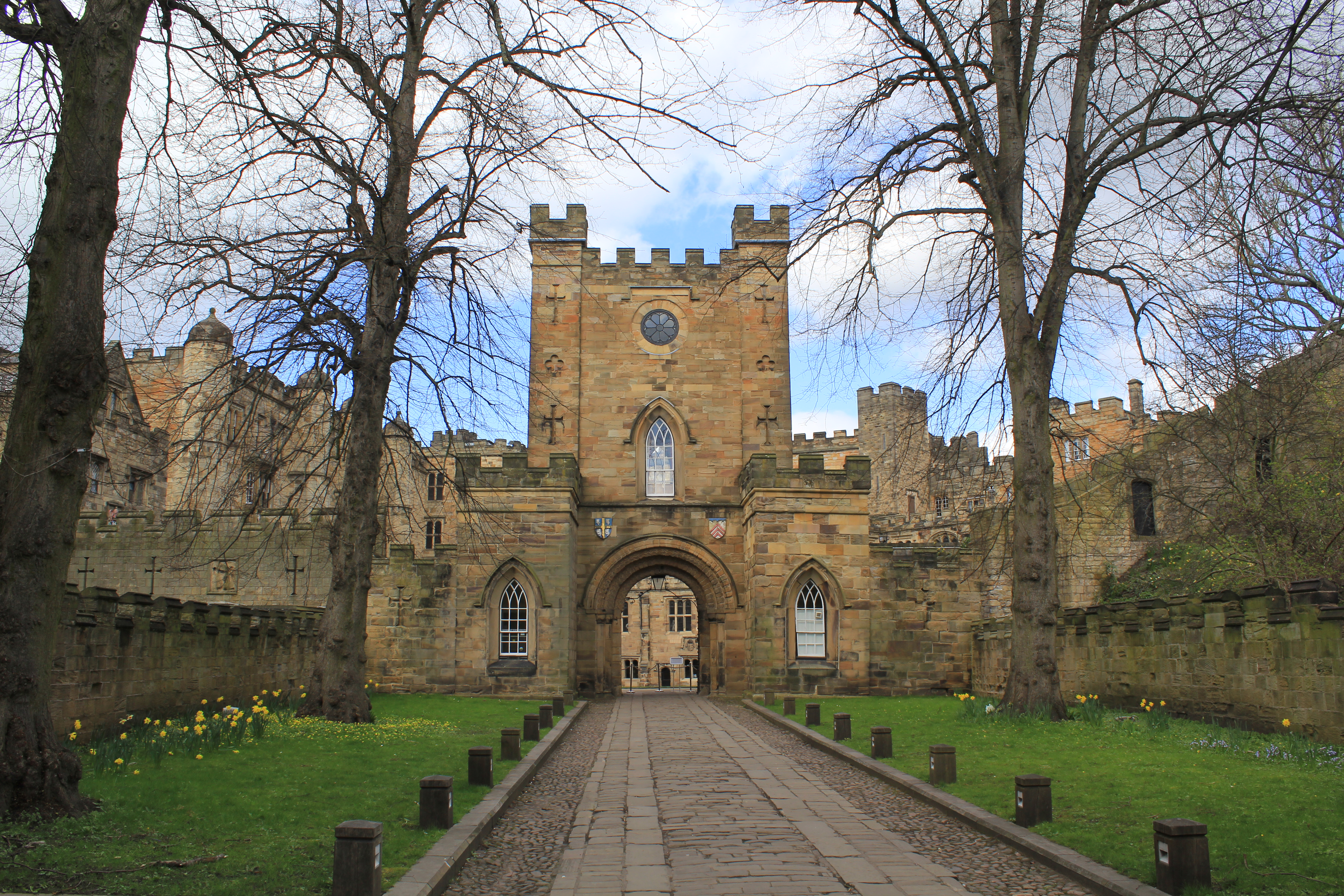
The entrance to Durham Castle, the bishops' palace until 1832 when it moved to Auckland Castle

The prior of Durham ranked first among the bishop's barons. He had his own court, and almost exclusive jurisdiction over his men. A UNESCO site describes the role of the Prince-Bishops in Durham, the "buffer state between England and Scotland":

From 1075, the Bishop of Durham became a Prince-Bishop, with the right to raise an army, mint his own coins, and levy taxes. As long as he remained loyal to the king of England, he could govern as a virtually autonomous ruler, reaping the revenue from his territory, but also remaining mindful of his role of protecting England’s northern frontier.

A report states that the Bishops also had the authority to appoint judges and barons and to offer pardons.

There were ten palatinate barons in the 12th century, most importantly the Hyltons of Hylton Castle, the Bulmers of Brancepeth, the Conyers of Sockburne, the Hansards of Evenwood, and the Lumleys of Lumley Castle. The Nevilles owned large estates in the county. John Neville, 3rd Baron Neville de Raby rebuilt Raby Castle, their principal seat, in 1377.

Edward I's quo warranto proceedings of 1293 showed twelve lords enjoying more or less extensive franchises under the bishop. The repeated efforts of the Crown to check the powers of the palatinate bishops culminated in 1536 in the Act of Resumption, which deprived the bishop of the power to pardon offences against the law or to appoint judicial officers. Moreover, indictments and legal processes were in future to run in the name of the king, and offences to be described as against the peace of the king, rather than that of the bishop. In 1596 restrictions were imposed on the powers of the chancery, and in 1646 the palatinate was formally abolished. It was revived, however, after the Restoration, and continued with much the same power until 5 July 1836, when the Durham (County Palatine) Act 1836 provided that the palatine jurisdiction should in future be vested in the Crown.

=== Wars ===
During the 15th-century Wars of the Roses, Henry VI passed through Durham. On the outbreak of the Great Rebellion in 1642 Durham inclined to support the cause of Parliament, and in 1640 the high sheriff of the palatinate guaranteed to supply the Scottish army with provisions during their stay in the county. In 1642 the Earl of Newcastle formed the western counties into an association for the King's service, but in 1644 the palatinate was again overrun by a Scottish army, and after the Battle of Marston Moor (2 July 1644) fell entirely into the hands of Parliament.

=== Parliamentary representation and secular powers ===
In 1614, a bill was introduced in Parliament for securing representation to the county and city of Durham and the borough of Barnard Castle. The bishop strongly opposed the proposal as an infringement of his palatinate rights, and the county was first summoned to return members to Parliament in 1654. After the Restoration of 1660 the county and city returned two members each. In the wake of the Reform Act 1832 the county returned two members for two divisions, and the boroughs of Gateshead, South Shields and Sunderland acquired representation. The bishops lost their secular powers in 1836. The boroughs of Darlington, Stockton and Hartlepool returned one member each from 1868 until the Redistribution of Seats Act 1885.

== Later government ==
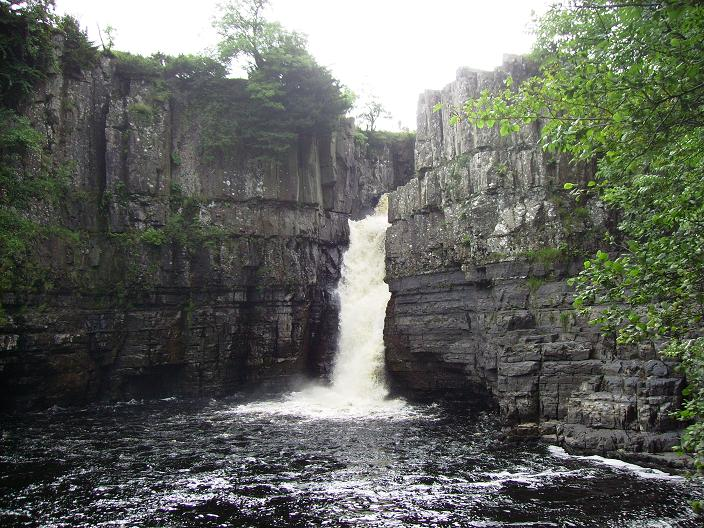
High Force waterfall on the River Tees

The Municipal Corporations Act 1835 reformed the municipal boroughs of Durham, Stockton on Tees and Sunderland. In 1875, Jarrow was incorporated as a municipal borough, as was West Hartlepool in 1887. At a county level, the Local Government Act 1888 reorganised local government throughout England and Wales. Most of the county came under control of the newly formed Durham County Council in an area known as an administrative county. Not included were the county boroughs of Gateshead, South Shields and Sunderland. However, for purposes other than local government, the administrative county of Durham and the county boroughs continued to form a single county to which the Crown appointed a Lord Lieutenant of Durham.

Over its existence, the administrative county lost territory, both to the existing county boroughs, and because two municipal boroughs became county boroughs: West Hartlepool in 1902 and Darlington in 1915. The county boundary with the North Riding of Yorkshire was adjusted in 1967: that part of the town of Barnard Castle historically in Yorkshire was added to County Durham, while the administrative county ceded the portion of the Borough of Stockton-on-Tees in Durham to the North Riding. In 1968, following the recommendation of the Local Government Commission, Billingham was transferred to the County Borough of Teesside, in the North Riding. In 1971, the population of the county—including all associated county boroughs (an area of 2,570 km^{2} (990 sq mi))—was 1,409,633, with a population outside the county boroughs of 814,396.

In 1974, the Local Government Act 1972 abolished the administrative county and the county boroughs, reconstituting County Durham as a non-metropolitan county. The reconstituted County Durham lost territory to the north-east (around Gateshead, South Shields and Sunderland) to Tyne and Wear and to the south-east (around Hartlepool) to Cleveland. At the same time it gained the former area of Startforth Rural District from the North Riding of Yorkshire. The area of the Lord Lieutenancy of Durham was also adjusted by the Act to coincide with the non-metropolitan county (which occupied 3,019 km^{2} (1,166 sq mi) in 1981).

In 1996, as part of 1990s UK local government reform by Lieutenancies Act 1997, Cleveland was abolished. Its districts were reconstituted as unitary authorities. Hartlepool and Stockton-on-Tees (north Tees) were returned to the county for the purposes of Lord Lieutenancy. Darlington also became a third unitary authority of the county. The Royal Mail abandoned the use of postal counties altogether, permitted but not mandatory being at a writer wishes.

As part of the 2009 structural changes to local government in England initiated by the Department for Communities and Local Government, the seven district councils within the County Council area were abolished. The County Council assumed their functions and became the fourth unitary authority. Changes came into effect on 1 April 2009.

On 15 April 2014, North East Combined Authority was established under the Local Democracy, Economic Development and Construction Act 2009 with powers over economic development and regeneration. In November 2018, Newcastle City Council, North Tyneside Borough Council, and Northumberland County Council left the authority. These later formed the North of Tyne Combined Authority.

In May 2021, four parish councils of the villages of Elwick, Hart, Dalton Piercy and Greatham all issued individual votes of no confidence in Hartlepool Borough Council, and expressed their desire to join the County Durham district.

In October 2021, County Durham was shortlisted for the UK City of Culture 2025. In May 2022, it lost to Bradford.

== Eighteenth century ==
Eighteenth century Durham saw the appearance of dissent in the county and the Durham Ox. The county did not assist the Jacobite Rebellion of 1715. The Statue of Neptune in the City of Durham was erected in 1729.

== Nineteenth century ==
A number of disasters happened in Nineteenth century Durham. The Felling mine disasters happened in 1812, 1813, 1821 and 1847. The Philadelphia train accident happened in 1815. In 1854, there was a great fire in Gateshead. One of the West Stanley Pit disasters happened in 1882. The Victoria Hall disaster happened in 1883.

== Twentieth century ==
One of the West Stanley Pit disasters happened in 1909. The Darlington rail crash happened in 1928. The Battle of Stockton happened in 1933. The Browney rail crash happened in 1946.

== Political history ==
The First Treaty of Durham was made at Durham in 1136. The Second Treaty of Durham was made at Durham in 1139.

== Military and naval history ==
The county regiment was the Durham Light Infantry, which replaced, in particular, the 68th (Durham) Regiment of Foot (Light Infantry) and the Militia and Volunteers of County Durham.

RAF Greatham, RAF Middleton St George and RAF Usworth were located in County Durham.

David I, the King of Scotland, invaded the county in 1136, and ravaged much of the county 1138. In 17 October 1346, the Battle of Neville's Cross was fought at Neville's Cross, near the city of Durham. On 16 December 1914, during the First World War, there was a raid on Hartlepool by the Imperial German Navy.

== Ecclesiastical history ==
Chroniclers connected with Durham include the Bede, Symeon of Durham, Geoffrey of Coldingham and Robert de Graystanes.

== Economic history ==
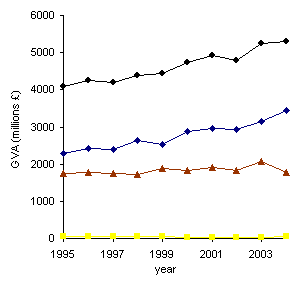
Graph showing unadjusted gross value added (GVA) in County Durham across 3 industries at current basic prices from 1995 to 2004. Legend Agriculture, hunting and forestry Industry, including energy and construction Service activities Total Source:

County Durham has long been associated with coal mining, from medieval times up to the late 20th century. The Durham Coalfield covered a large area of the county, from Bishop Auckland, to Consett, to the River Tyne and below the North Sea, thereby providing a significant expanse of territory from which this rich mineral resource could be extracted.

King Stephen possessed a mine in Durham, which he granted to Bishop Pudsey, and in the same century colliers are mentioned at Coundon, Bishopwearmouth and Sedgefield. Cockfield Fell was one of the earliest Landsale collieries in Durham. Edward III issued an order allowing coal dug at Newcastle to be taken across the Tyne, and Richard II granted to the inhabitants of Durham licence to export the produce of the mines, without paying dues to the corporation of Newcastle. The majority was transported from the Port of Sunderland complex, which was constructed in the 1850s.

Among other early industries, lead-mining was carried on in the western part of the county, and mustard was extensively cultivated. Gateshead had a considerable tanning trade and shipbuilding was undertaken at Jarrow, and at Sunderland, which became the largest shipbuilding town in the world – constructing a third of Britain's tonnage.

The county's modern-era economic history was facilitated significantly by the growth of the mining industry during the nineteenth century. At the industry's height, in the early 20th century, over 170,000 coal miners were employed, and they mined 58,700,000 tons of coal in 1913 alone. As a result, a large number of colliery villages were built throughout the county as the Industrial Revolution gathered pace.

The railway industry was also a major employer during the industrial revolution, with railways being built throughout the county, such as The Tanfield Railway, The Clarence Railway and The Stockton and Darlington Railway. The growth of this industry occurred alongside the coal industry, as the railways provided a fast, efficient means to move coal from the mines to the ports and provided the fuel for the locomotives. The great railway pioneers Timothy Hackworth, Edward Pease, George Stephenson and Robert Stephenson were all actively involved with developing the railways in tandem with County Durham's coal mining industry. Shildon and Darlington became thriving 'railway towns' and experienced significant growths in population and prosperity; before the railways, just over 100 people lived in Shildon but, by the 1890s, the town was home to around 8,000 people, with Shildon Shops employing almost 3000 people at its height.

However, by the 1930s, the coal mining industry began to diminish and, by the mid-twentieth century, the pits were closing at an increasing rate. In 1951, the Durham County Development Plan highlighted a number of colliery villages, such as Blackhouse, as 'Category D' settlements, in which future development would be prohibited, property would be acquired and demolished, and the population moved to new housing, such as that being built in Newton Aycliffe. Likewise, the railway industry also began to decline, and was significantly brought to a fraction of its former self by the Beeching cuts in the 1960s. Darlington Works closed in 1966 and Shildon Shops followed suit in 1984. The county's last deep mines, at Easington, Vane Tempest, Wearmouth and Westoe, closed in 1993.

== Post markings ==
Postal Rates from 1801 were charged depending on the distance from London. Durham was allocated the code 263 the approximate mileage from London. From about 1811, a datestamp appeared on letters showing the date the letter was posted. In 1844 a new system was introduced and Durham was allocated the code 267. This system was replaced in 1840 when the first postage stamps were introduced.

== Antiquities ==
According to the Encyclopædia Britannica Eleventh Edition (1911): "To the Anglo-Saxon period are to be referred portions of the churches of Monk Wearmouth (Sunderland), Jarrow, Escomb near Bishop Auckland, and numerous sculptured crosses, two of which are in situ at Aycliffe. . . . The Decorated and Perpendicular periods are very scantily represented, on account, as is supposed, of the incessant wars between England and Scotland in the 14th and 15th centuries. The principal monastic remains, besides those surrounding Durham cathedral, are those of its subordinate house or "cell," Finchale Priory, beautifully situated by the Wear. The most interesting castles are those of Durham, Raby, Brancepeth and Barnard. There are ruins of castelets or peel-towers at Dalden, Ludworth and Langley Dale. The hospitals of Sherburn, Greatham and Kepyer, founded by early bishops of Durham, retain but few ancient features."

The best remains of the Norman period include Durham Cathedral and Durham Castle, and several parish churches, such as St Laurence Church in Pittington. The Early English period has left the eastern portion of the cathedral, the churches of Darlington, Hartlepool, and St Andrew, Auckland, Sedgefield, and portions of a few other churches.

'Durham Castle and Cathedral' is a designated UNESCO World Heritage Site. Elsewhere in the County there is Auckland Castle.

== Museums ==
Museums include North of England Lead Mining Museum, Beamish Museum, Bowes Museum, Head of Steam and the National Museum of the Royal Navy, Hartlepool.
