= Geology of County Durham =

Geology of English county

This article describes the geology of the ceremonial county of Durham. It includes the boroughs of Darlington, Hartlepool and Stockton-on-Tees but not those former northeastern parts of the county which are now in the county of Tyne and Wear.

The geology of County Durham in northeast England consists of a basement of Lower Palaeozoic rocks overlain by a varying thickness of Carboniferous and Permo-Triassic sedimentary rocks which dip generally eastwards towards the North Sea. These have been intruded by a pluton, sills and dykes at various times from the Devonian Period to the Palaeogene. The whole is overlain by a suite of unconsolidated deposits of Quaternary age arising from glaciation and from other processes operating during the post-glacial period to the present. The geological interest of the west of the county was recognised by the designation in 2003 of the North Pennines Area of Outstanding Natural Beauty as a European Geopark.

The word 'geology' may be traced back to a coinage of Richard de Bury who was a Bishop of Durham in the 14th century. He introduced the term geologia in his work The Philobiblon which he explained as 'the earthly science'.

== Ordovician ==
The oldest rocks at or near the surface within County Durham are Ordovician age (485 - 443 Ma) Skiddaw Group rocks found in a small inlier near Cronkley Fell in upper Teesdale. They are recorded as the Skiddaw Slates, better known from the Lake District 50 km to the west. A small quarry in these phyllites was worked at one time to make slate pencils. Overlying these are pyroclastic rocks thought to belong to the Borrowdale Volcanic Group.

No rocks from the succeeding Silurian Period (443 - 419 Ma) are seen at outcrop in the county.

== Devonian ==
No rocks of Devonian age (419 - 359 Ma) are seen at outcrop in the county though a pluton, the Weardale Granite forming the North Pennine Batholith was intruded into Lower Palaeozoic rocks around 410 million years ago during the Devonian Period. It forms a part of the larger 'North of England Plutonic Suite', whose members (which include the granites at Shap and Skiddaw) were emplaced during the Caledonian Orogeny. The buoyancy of this batholith (it is less dense than the rock into which it was intruded) is considered to be responsible for the existence of the Alston Block which coincides with the North Pennines and which is essentially an eastward dipping horst bounded to the west (outside of County Durham) by the Pennine Fault System, to the north by the Stublick and Ninety Fathom faults (in Northumberland) and by the Butterknowle Fault and Stainmore Trough to the south.

== Carboniferous ==
There is a thick succession of rocks in County Durham which originated during the Carboniferous Period (359 - 299 Ma). The detail of the rock succession varies from one part of the county to another and in no one location is the entire sequence detailed below in place. The sequence over the Alston Block is generally thinner than elsewhere.

The western half of the county forms a part of the Pennine range of hills which are formed largely by the sandstones and limestones of the Great Scar Limestone and overlying Yoredale groups. Further east it is the younger Coal Measures rocks which are found at the surface. Further east again the Carboniferous succession is overlain by younger rocks but they are present at increasing depth to the North Sea coast and beyond.

Note that the subdivision of the British Carboniferous rock sequence has undergone considerable revision in recent years and many traditional sequence names are now obsolete in formal use, though of course they remain widespread in the literature. What is now referred to as the Pennine Coal Measures Group would once have been referred to simply as the 'Productive Coal Measures' and the Yoredale Group was the 'Yoredale Series'. The 'Millstone Grit' of County Durham (minus the 'Great Limestone Member') has been renamed as the 'Stainmore Formation', having also been referred to somewhat confusingly as the Stainmore Group at one time.

A feature of much of the Carboniferous succession in northern England is its cyclicity which has involved regular changes between marine deposition and sedimentation from rivers. The phenomenon is manifest as cyclothems and is especially prominent in the Yoredale Group sequence.

=== Great Scar Limestone Group ===
A part of the Carboniferous Limestone Supergroup, the Great Scar Limestone Group consists of a number of different formations except over the Alston Block where a 107m thickness of largely Asbian age limestones and sandstones occurs and is known as the Melmerby Scar Limestone Formation.

- Great Scar Limestone Group
  - Knipe Scar Limestone Formation
  - Potts Beck Formation
  - Ashfell Limestone Formation
  - Ashfell Sandstone Formation
  - Breakyneck Scar Limestone Formation
  - Brownber Formation
  - Scandal Beck Limestone Formation
  - Coldbeck Limestone Formation

Limestone was widely quarried for the production of lime for agriculture and lime mortar for building. Industrial scale quarrying accompanied the growth of the iron and steel industries but has since declined. The Frosterley Marble, a bituminous coraliferous limestone once worked at Harehope Quarry in Weardale is used as a decorative stone and can be found in many churches in the region. Concentrations of such corals as Dibunophyllum bipartitum and of brachiopod remains contribute to its attractiveness when sections are polished.

=== Yoredale Group ===
Rocks assigned to the Yoredale Group overlie the Carboniferous Limestone succession. The Group is subdivided into a lower/older Alston Formation and a higher/younger Stainmore Formation. The former is largely of Brigantian age whilst the latter is of Asbian/Brigantian to Yeadonian age. The latter is broadly equivalent to the Millstone Grit of the central and southern Pennines. Note that in northeast England some hard rock units are traditionally described as 'sills', a local term for a hard band of rock of whatever origin. Nowadays geologists reserve the term for flat-lying igneous intrusions such as the Whin Sill which is described below.

- Yoredale Group
  - Stainmore Formation (formerly Millstone Grit)
    - various un-named sandstones and mudstones
    - Grindstone Sandstone (formerly Grindstone Sill)
    - various un-named sandstones and mudstones
    - Firestone Sandstone (formerly Firestone Sill)
    - various sandstones and mudstones
  - Alston Formation (formerly Alston Group)
    - Great Limestone Member (formerly part of Stainmore Group of Millstone Grit - Pendleian)
    - Four Fathom Limestone Member
    - various sandstones and limestones
    - Three Yard Limestone Member
    - various sandstones and limestones
    - Five Yard Limestone Member
    - various sandstones and limestones
    - Scar Limestone Member
    - various sandstones and limestones
    - Tynebottom Limestone Member
    - various sandstones and limestones

=== Coal Measures ===
Overlying the Yoredale Group rocks is a thick sequence of Coal Measures across which the Durham Coalfield developed. The sequence in County Durham is divided into Lower, Middle and Upper formations. Each of the three are dominated by mudstones but contain abundant sandstones and coal seams. Ironstone bands occur in the lower part of the sequence. At least eleven marine bands (shelly mudstones in general) occur within the Coal Measures. Of these, the 'Quarterburn' marine band defines the base of the Lower Coal Measures Formation, the 'Harvey' marine band defines its junction with the overlying Middle Coal Measures Formation and the 'Down Hill' marine band defines the latter's junction with the Upper Coal Measures Formation. The Quarterburn, Harvey and Down Hill marine bands correlate with the standard Subcrenatum, Vanderbeckei and Cambriense marine bands of elsewhere. The top of the entire Coal Measures sequence is an erosion surface.

- Pennine Coal Measures Group
  - Pennine Upper Coal Measures Formation
  - Pennine Middle Coal Measures Formation (Duckmantian)
  - Pennine Lower Coal Measures Formation (Langsettian)

Over the Alston Block the middle and upper Coal Measures are missing. Similarly in the Stainmore Trough on the Yorkshire border, both the upper part of the Middle and the entire Upper Coal Measures are absent. The rank of coal increases in the west, a result of the heating of these strata by the Weardale Granite. Some such seams are semi-anthracites. Workings for coal date back centuries though the height of the industry was the nineteenth century. There are no deep pits remaining in the county though opencasting continues.

Various of the county's Coal Measures sandstones have been quarried for building stone, for example the Low Main Post sandstone in Durham which was used in the construction of the city's cathedral.

=== Late Carboniferous intrusive rocks ===
The 'Hett Subswarm' of tholeiitic quartz-dolerite dykes run WSW-ENE across country to the south of Durham. The subswarm includes the Hett Dyke and Ludworth Dyke amongst others which cut Coal Measures rocks in a WSW-ENE alignment but do not pass into the overlying Permian succession.

== Permian and Triassic ==
As with the Carboniferous sequence, the subdivision of the British Permian (299 - 252 Ma) and Triassic (252 - 201 Ma) has been considerably revised in recent years. Traditional sequence names have been replaced in formal use by new names, though the older names are frequently encountered in books and on maps. The full sequence of Permian and Triassic rocks forming the New Red Sandstone Supergroup locally is this (uppermost/youngest first):

- Mercia Mudstone Group (formerly Keuper Marl) (Triassic)
- Sherwood Sandstone Group (formerly Bunter Sandstone) (Triassic)
- Zechstein Group (Permian)
  - Roxby Formation (calcareous mudstone, formerly Upper Anyhdrite and Marl)
  - Sherburn Anhydrite Formation (in Stockton area only)
  - Rotten Marl Formation (formerly Rotten or Carnallitic Marl)
  - Boulby Halite Formation (formerly Middle Halite in Durham area)
  - Seaham Formation (formerly Upper Magnesian Limestone - calcareous mudstone)
  - Seaham Residue & Fordon Evaporite Formation (Edlington Formation in Stockton area (formerly Permian Middle Marls))
  - Roker Formation (formerly Hartlepool Anydrite & Roker Dolomite)
  - Ford Formation (formerly Middle Magnesian Limestone)
  - Raisby Formation (formerly Lower Magnesian Limestone)
  - Marl Slate Formation (formerly Marl Slate)
- Rotliegendes Group (Permian)
  - Yellow Sands Formation (formerly Basal Permian (Sands &) Breccia)

The Yellow Sands Formation comprises aeolian dune-bedded sandstones. The Yellow Sands Formation continues to be worked for building sand. These are overlain by the thin bituminous limestones of the 'Marl Slate' representing the start of a series of inundations of the area by rising sea levels. It contains abundant fish remains.

The sequence from the Marl Slate up to and including the Seaham Formation was formerly known as the Magnesian Limestone. The 'Zechstein Group' replaced the former Don, Aislaby, Teesside, Staintondale and Eskdale groups. Several of these units have proved economically valuable. Anhydrite was sourced beneath Hartlepool and gypsum near Darlington. The Magnesian Limestone forms a broken west-facing scarp running from the western edge of Sunderland southwards through Houghton-le-Spring and Hetton-le-Hole to Coxhoe where its outcrop is offset to the west by the Butterknowle Fault. English Nature has defined this part of the county east of the scarp where the sequence is exposed at or near the surface, as the 'Durham Magnesian Limestone Plateau' in its assessment of 'character areas'. The occurrence of gypsum and anhydrite reflects the extreme nature of the evaporation of the shallow Zechstein Sea on occasion though such evaporites are economically valuable. They also present constraints on development as ongoing subterranean solution of these deposits causes occasional catastrophic ground collapse. Similar solution in Palaeogene times has created 'collapse breccias' of overlying strata.

Dolomite from the Roker Formation has been quarried for building construction along the Durham coast. It has sometimes been referred to as 'Cannonball Rock' due to the appearance of calcitic concretions in certain beds. St Oswald's Church in Hartlepool is constructed from this stone.

=== Permian intrusive rocks ===
The Whin Sill and associated igneous dykes were intruded into the existing sedimentary sequence during the early Permian around 295 Ma. The thickness of the quartz-dolerite sill averages about 30m. The sill underlies the larger part of the county at depth and appears to extend beneath the North Sea to the east. Thermal metamorphism has altered the surrounding strata, the 'country rocks', to a distance of tens of metres or more. One such is the Sugar Limestone of upper Teesdale which weathers in characteristic fashion and hosts a rare assemblage of plants. Mudstones in contact with the sill have been altered into hornfels, known locally as 'whetstone'. The presence of the Whin Sill gives rise to High Force where the River Tees drops in spectacular fashion over this erosion-resistant rock. The Little Whin Sill is a thinner, more geographically restricted intrusion of dolerite of similar age outcropping in upper Weardale. A quarry near High Force in upper Teesdale works the dolerite (or 'whinstone') of the Whin Sill for roadstone, aggregate and as larger blocks for coastal protection purposes.

=== Northern Pennine Orefield ===
The Northern Pennine Orefield comprises an extended network of veins and 'flats' developed within the Carboniferous sedimentary sequence and is considered one of the finest examples of Mississippi Valley type orefields. Epigenetic mineralisation (i.e. mineralisation at a shallow level) of veins and faults took place shortly after emplacement of the Whin Sill at the start of the Permian Period. Mining for lead, copper and zinc has taken place over several centuries across these uplands.

== Palaeogene ==
Volcanism centred on western Scotland took place during the Palaeogene Period and resulted in the intrusion of innumerable dykes, one of which is the Cleveland Dyke which extends from Galloway through County Durham to the North York Moors. This intrusion of basaltic andesite which is up to 30m wide in places has been dated to 55.8+/- 0.9Ma

== Structure ==
The broad structure of the Alston Block has been described in the Devonian section above. The block is itself cut north to south a by a complex structure known as the 'Burtreeford Disturbance' which comprises both faults and folds. To the east of the block the cover of late Palaeozoic and early Mesozoic rocks dip into the North Sea Basin.

== Quaternary ==
=== Glacial legacy ===
Much of the county is mantled with a layer of glacial till though this is thinner on the higher ground in the west. There are also spreads of glacially derived sand and gravel, especially across part of the lower ground in the east. Alluvium deposited by rivers occupies the floors of valleys such as that of the Wear whilst river terraces are frequent in the Tees valley. Lacustrine clays and silts occur in parts of the east where for example, towards the end of the last ice age, Glacial Lake Wear and Glacial Lake Edderacres formed as drainage eastwards was blocked by an icesheet occupying the North Sea.

=== Post-glacial ===
Peat has developed extensively across the higher ground of the North Pennines. A variety of coastal deposits are found around the Tees estuary and up the coast to Hartlepool and beyond.

== Geoconservation and Geotourism ==
Some locations in County Durham are afforded statutory legal protection against adverse developments through being designated as one or more of the following:

=== Local geological sites ===
A geodiversity audit of County Durham produced many locations which are now afforded recognition as 'Local geological sites' (formerly referred to as 'Regionally Important Geodiversity Sites' or simply 'RIGS'.

=== Local nature reserves ===
LNRs may be designated for their biological or geological interest. In any case, more often than not, the biological interest is dependent upon the geological interest as at Wingate Quarry LNR north of Trimdon Grange village where 'Magnesian Limestone grassland' may be found

=== Sites of Special Scientific Interest ===
Numerous SSSIs include citations referring to their geological interest. The extensive Moorhouse and Cross Fell SSSI (shared with Cumbria) is one of the most important for a range of subjects. Natural England and other conservation bodies own and manage these locations. The Durham Coast is one such which is designated in part for its coastal geomorphology.

Bodies such as the North Pennines AONB Partnership and Durham County Council have published local geodiversity action plans (or 'LGAPs') which summarise an area's geological interests and propose various measures to conserve what is perceived to be valuable.

=== North Pennines AONB and Geopark ===
The North Pennines AONB was designated as Britain's first European Geopark in 2003 partly in acknowledgement of its geological and geomorphological interest. The AONB and Geopark extend beyond the boundaries of County Durham to include parts of Northumberland and Cumbria.

== See also ==
- Geology of the United Kingdom
- Geology of England
