= Crawley Edge Cairns =

- Crawley Edge Cairnfield
- Map showing the location of the Crawley Edge Cairns in County Durham.
- 54.753149°N 1.9968609°W
- Type: Bronze Age Cairnfield
- Location: near Stanhope, County Durham
- Region: North East

The Crawley Edge Cairns are a series of forty-two Bronze Age round barrows, cairns and clearance cairns located in a field in Crawleyside, near Stanhope, County Durham, England.

== The Cairnfield ==
The cairnfield site lies on a gentle south-facing slope of a hill-spur in Weardale and remains in open moorland. Two of the cairns were excavated in 1977 and surveys undertaken in 1984 and 1991.

The inclusion of clearance cairns at the site is usually taken as an indication of clearance in advance of arable farming, but the Crawley Edge field unusually includes a barrow cremation mound among the cairns.

== See also ==
- History of County Durham
- Bronze Age Britain
- Heathery Burn Cave
