= Close House Mine =

Protected area in County Durham, England

- Location within County Durham
- Location: MAGiC MaP
- Nearest town: Barnard Castle
- Coordinates: 54°36′2″N 2°14′4″W
- Area: 3.37 ha (8.3 acres)
- Established: 1995
- Governing body: Natural England
- Website: Close House Mine SSSI

Close House Mine is a Site of Special Scientific Interest in the Teesdale district of west County Durham, England. It is a disused opencast mine located in Arngill Beck on the north-east flank of Close House Crags, in the Lunedale Forest. The site is surrounded on three sides by the Upper Teesdale SSSI.

The mine is situated within the Lunedale fault system, at the southern limit of the Alston Block. A large barite ore body is exposed at the mine and a rare mineral, rosasite, has been identified at the site.
