= Kings Trough =

Undersea trough in the Atlantic Ocean

Coordinates: 43°48′00.0″N 22°00′00.9″W

Kings Trough (sometimes spelled King's Trough) is an undersea trough in the North Atlantic Ocean. It is located on the east side of the Mid-Atlantic Ridge, northwest of the Açores-Biscay Rise and roughly 400 km (250 mi) north-northeast of the Azores. It is approximately 400 km (250 mi) long, running in a northwest–southeast direction. To the east it branches into the Peake Deep and Freen Deep. The center depth is 4,500 m (14,800 ft). Surrounding the trough are high ridges and seamounts, such as the Antialtair Seamount and the Crumb Seamount complex. Various explanations for the complex have been suggested, ranging from compression, a former plate boundary, transform faulting or even an oblique meteor impact.

The trough, being in an apparently geologically stable region, has been studied as a possible location for radioactive waste disposal.
