= Trough (geology) =

Linear structural depression that extends laterally over a distance

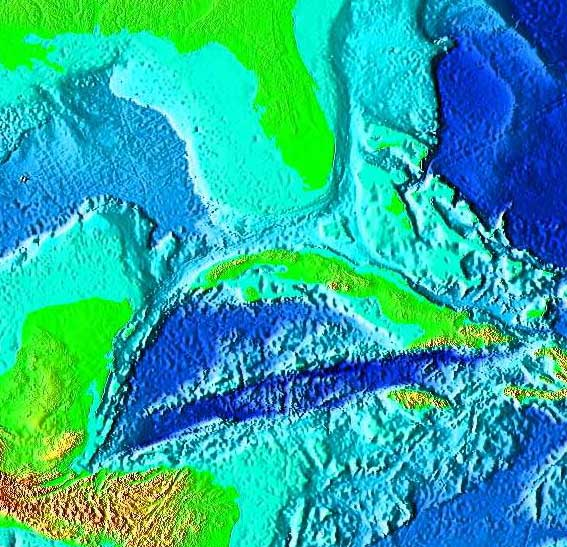
Satellite image of the Cayman Trough

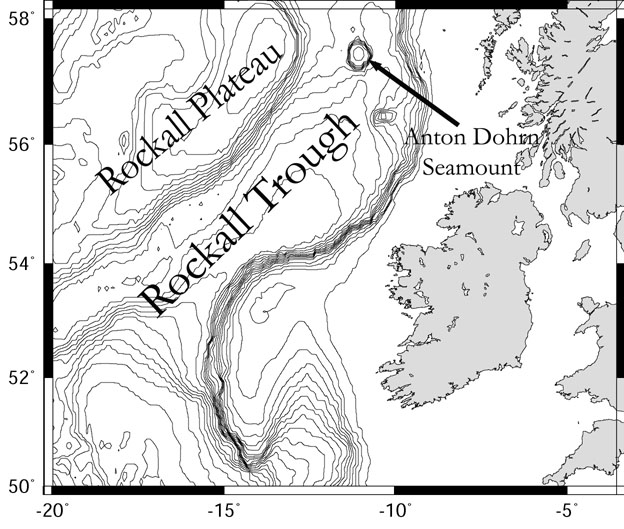
Bathymetric features of the Rockall Trough northwest of Scotland and Ireland

In geology, a trough is a linear structural depression that extends laterally over a distance. Although it is less steep than a trench, a trough can be a narrow basin or a geologic rift. These features often form at the rim of tectonic plates. There are various oceanic troughs on the ocean floors. Troughs created by glaciation are called glacial trough.

== Examples of oceanic troughs ==
- Benue Trough
- Cayman Trough
- Hesperides Trough
- Kings Trough
- Mariana Trough
- Nankai Trough
- Northumberland Trough
- Okinawa Trough in the East China Sea
- Rockall Trough and others along the rift of the mid-oceanic ridge
- Salton Trough
- South Shetland Trough
- Suakin Trough in the Red Sea
- Timor Trough

== See also ==
- Oceanic basin
- Thalweg
- Walker Lane
