= Frosterley Marble =

Fossiliferous limestone from County Durham, England

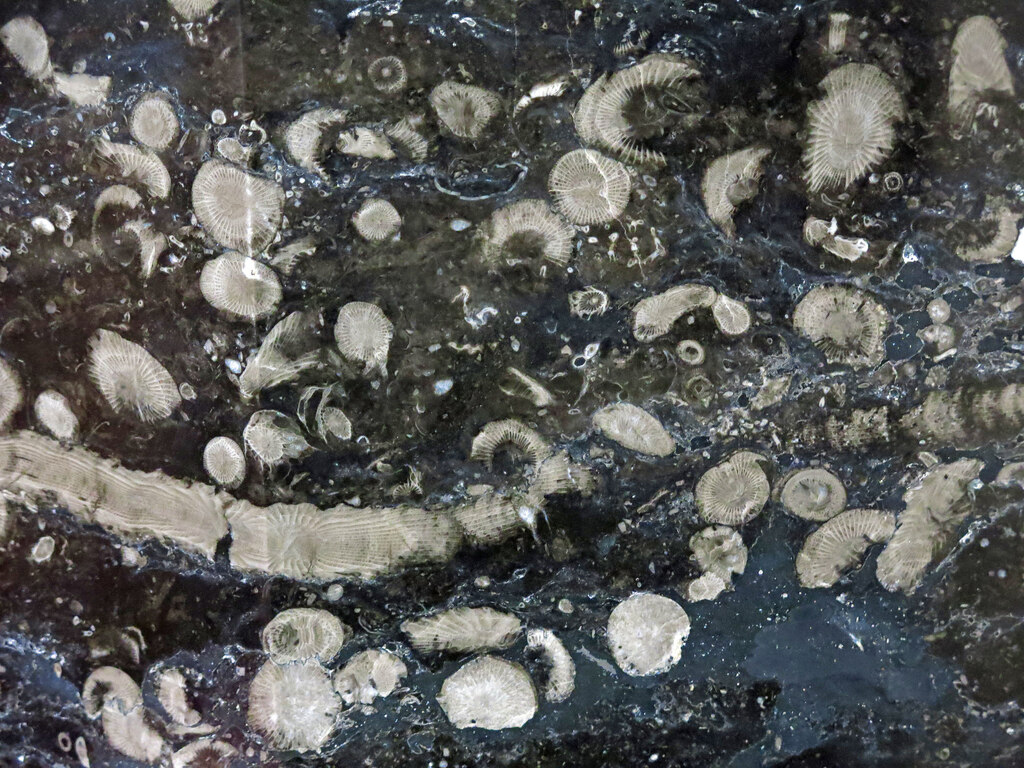
Fossiled corals in polished Frosterley Marble

Frosterley Marble is a black, bituminous coraliferous limestone of the Lower Carboniferous (Mississippian), some 325 million years ago. It outcrops in Weardale, County Durham, England, including near the village of Frosterley whence it is named.

== Geology ==
Unlike a true marble, it is not a metamorphic rock, but is so-called because it can take a fine polish. Concentrations of such corals as Dibunophyllum bipartitum and of brachiopod remains contribute to its attractiveness when sections are polished.

== Use ==
It is cut and polished for use as ornate stone, and was much desired for church decoration, particularly during the Middle Ages. The decorative columns found in Durham Cathedral date from about 1350. It has been used as far afield as India, as the base of the pulpit in St. Thomas Cathedral, Mumbai. The font at York Minster and the font at Beverley Minster are also made from Frosterley Marble. Other ecclesiastical installations of Frosterley Marble include St Peter's Chapel at Auckland Castle, Brisbane Cathedral in Australia, Tynemouth Priory, Newminster Abbey, and Rievaulx Abbey.

== See also ==
- Geology of County Durham
- List of decorative stones
- List of types of marble
