= Hespérides Trough =

The Hespérides Trough (60°21′S 50°50′W) is an undersea trough named for the Spanish research vessel Hespérides. The name was approved by the Advisory Committee on Undersea Features in November 1995.
