= Close House (Iowa City, Iowa) =

Historic house in Iowa, United States

- U.S. National Register of Historic Places
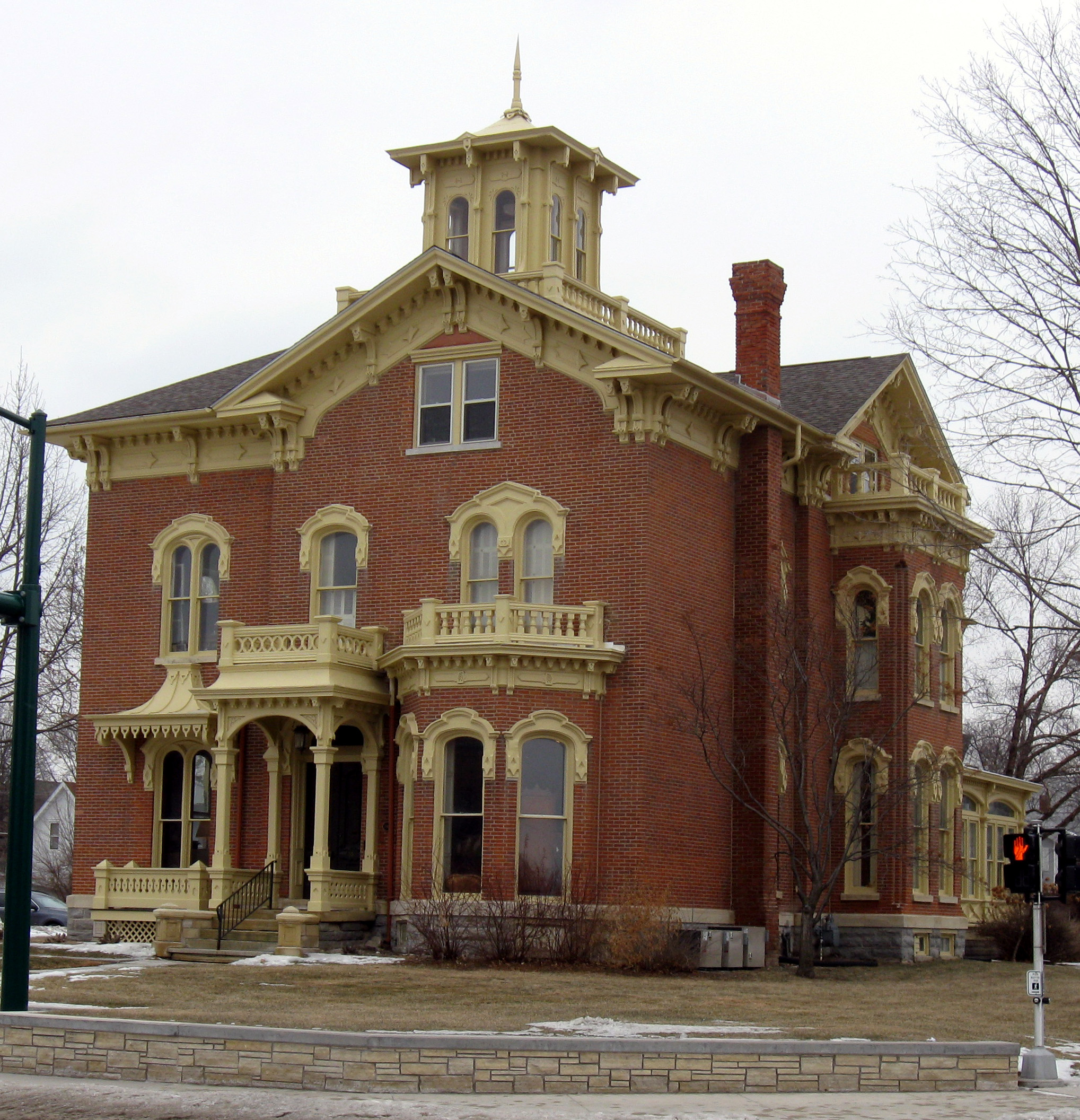

- Location within Iowa Location within the United States
- Location: 538 S. Gilbert St. Iowa City, Iowa
- Coordinates: 41°39′16″N 91°31′47″W
- Area: less than one acre
- Built: 1874
- Architect: August Hazelhorst
- Architectural style: Italianate
- NRHP reference No.: 74000791
- Added to NRHP: May 31, 1974

The Close Mansion, also known as the Close House, was one of the great mansions of Iowa City, Iowa, USA, and is listed on the National Register of Historic Places. It was built in 1874 at a cost of around $15,000. The mansion is located at the corner of Gilbert and Bowery in Iowa City. The Close family was involved in a linseed oil company and a glove factory, both of which were located near that home.

== Uses of the home ==
After the Close family sold the home it was used by the Acacia Fraternity and later was occupied by the Johnson County Department of Social Welfare. During the years of the home's renovation, several of the Italianate-style characteristics were removed, including the widows walk, the front balconies and the glassed-in cupola. The red brick of the house was temporarily painted gray but the paint has since been removed. The cupola and balconies have since been restored to the home. The Close Mansion currently houses Public Space One, a community driven, non-profit contemporary arts center. The LGBTQ Iowa Archives & Library is housed on the mansion's second floor.
