= Heathery Burn Cave =

Cave and archaeological site in the United Kingdom

- Map showing the location of Heathery Burn Cave in County Durham.
- 54.765549°N 2.0207943°W
- Type: Bronze Age Cave and hoard
- Location: near Stanhope, County Durham
- Region: North East

Site notes
- Archaeologists: William Greenwell
- Public access: Site removed by quarrying

Heathery Burn Cave is a cave near Stanhope, County Durham, England, in which a large collection of Late Bronze Age weapons and tools was discovered and excavated between 1859 and 1872.

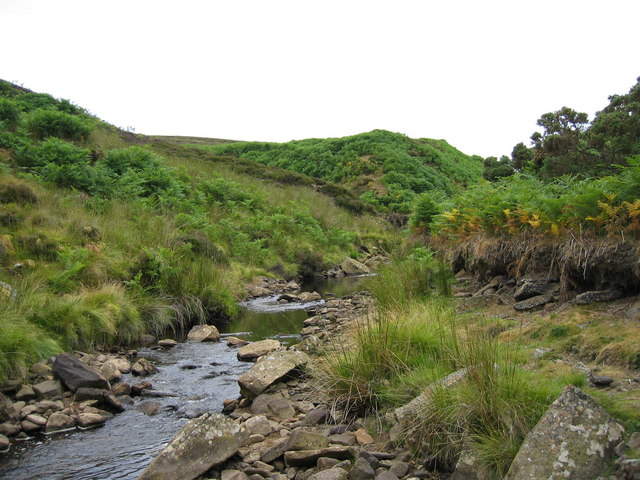
Stanhope Burn below Steward Shield Meadow Farm

== Location ==
The cave was in a ravine formed by Stanhope Burn, a small tributary of the River Wear. The cave itself was about a mile north of the confluence of the burn and the river, on the left bank. The floor of the cave was 10 feet (3.0 metres) above the level of the burn, and was a tourist destination before the quarrying of the limestone for smelting purposes. The cave has subsequently been destroyed.

=== Geology ===
The geology of the area forms part of the Yoredale Group of limestone with subordinate sandstone and argillaceous rocks.

== Discovery ==
The earliest archaeological discoveries in the cave were made in the 1750s or 1760s, though the full extent of the site did not become known until later. Primarily, the material was discovered progressively in the latter half of the 19th century as a result of quarrying on the site. The finds were recorded and catalogued by William Greenwell between 1859 and 1872, who described them as "one of the most valuable discoveries ever made in Britain of weapons, implements, ornaments, and other things belonging to the Bronze Age". The objects from the cave are dispersed across several museums in the United Kingdom; the largest collection is in the British Museum, but material is also stored in the Ashmolean Museum and Yorkshire Museum. Bronze Age implements are few in number from Weardale; the only other examples from near Wolsingham and Eastgate.

== Finds from the Cave ==
Over two hundred Late Bronze Age objects have been located from the Heathery Burn Cave.

=== Gold ===
Two gold objects are present in the assemblage – one bracelet and one unidentified ornament taking the form of a penannular, convex disc with a triangular section. Gold working began in Britain during the early part of the Bronze Age.

=== Copper alloy ===
A significant quantity of copper alloy weapons and tools forms the major part of this assemblage, including socketed axeheads, spearheads, casting moulds, fittings, rings, swords, and a bucket.

=== Ceramic ===
The discovery of the ceramic remains was recounted by William Greenwell: "a large quantity of fragmentary pieces (of pottery), principally small, was discovered in all parts of the cave, but the greater portion has unfortunately not been preserved." The true extent of the ceramic remains from the cave is now lost, along with the find spots within the cave complex.

=== Bone ===
Objects carved from bone include spatulas and toggles. A handle was made from red deer antler, and pendants were made from horse and dog teeth. Pointed bone tools were carved from sheep tibiae or roe deer metapodials. Shells had been perforated for use as pendants, using shells from Nucella lapillus (dog whelk), and Littorina obtusata – both of which species had to be transported from the coast. Human remains were also found in the cave.

=== Flint ===
Flint tools form only a small part of the assemblage. Of the 196 objects in the British Museum from Heathery Burn Cave, only four are made from worked flint: one barbed-and-tanged arrowhead, and three flakes.

== See also ==
- Geology of County Durham
- Geology of England
