= Munster Basin =

- Stratigraphic range: Devonian
- Type: Sedimentary basin

Lithology
- Primary: Old Red Sandstone

Location
- Coordinates: 51.8998°N 8.469772°W
- Country: Ireland

The Munster Basin is a late Middle to Upper Devonian age extensional (rift) sedimentary basin in the south-west of Ireland. The basin fill comprises fluvial Old Red Sandstone (ORS) magnafacies with minor silicic volcanic and mafic sub-volcanic centres. The depocentre of the basin is located between the MacGillycuddy's Reeks and the Kenmare River on the Iveragh peninsula where the succession is at least ca. 6 km thick. The non-marine ORS is conformably succeeded by latest Devonian coastal plain and shallow marine clastic deposits (the Toe Head Sandstone and Old Head Sandstone Formations, and equivalents), followed by shallow to deeper marine Carboniferous sandstones, mudstones and limestones of the South Munster Basin. During the Late Palaeozoic Variscan (or Hercynian) orogeny the deposits in the basin were subjected to compressional deformation that resulted in pressure solution cleavage formation, buckle folding and contractional faulting under very low-grade metamorphic conditions.

The oldest deposits found in the Munster Basin belong to the Valentia Slate Formation from which a silicic air-fall tuff bed (the Keel-Enagh Tuff) was radiometrically dated as 384.9 ± 0.7 Ma, which can be linked to local miospore biostratigraphic records. In combination, this corresponds to a late Givetian chronostratigraphic age on recent Devonian time scales. The general Late Devonian age of the basin fill is also given by miospore and fish fossil records.
