= Northumberland Trough =

The Northumberland Trough, also known as the Northumberland Basin, is an element of the structural geology of northern England, the origin of which dates back to the Carboniferous period when a block and basin province was established throughout the Pennine region.

The trough is an ENE-WSW aligned half-graben, an asymmetric depositional basin. It is defined to the south by the Stublick and Ninety Fathom faults, which separate the trough from the Alston Block. To the north, where its depth is least, the trough's boundary with the Cheviot Block is less well-defined; nevertheless, the south-easterly down-throwing Featherwood and Alwinton faults can be identified along this margin. To the west, the trough is continuous with the Solway Basin. The surrounding blocks are buoyed up by granite batholiths maintaining these regions of the upper crust as areas of raised relief.

== See also ==
Geological Structure of Great Britain
