= North Pennine Batholith =

Granite batholith under northeast England

Coordinates: 54°45′0″N 2°4′0″W

- Stratigraphic range: Early Devonian
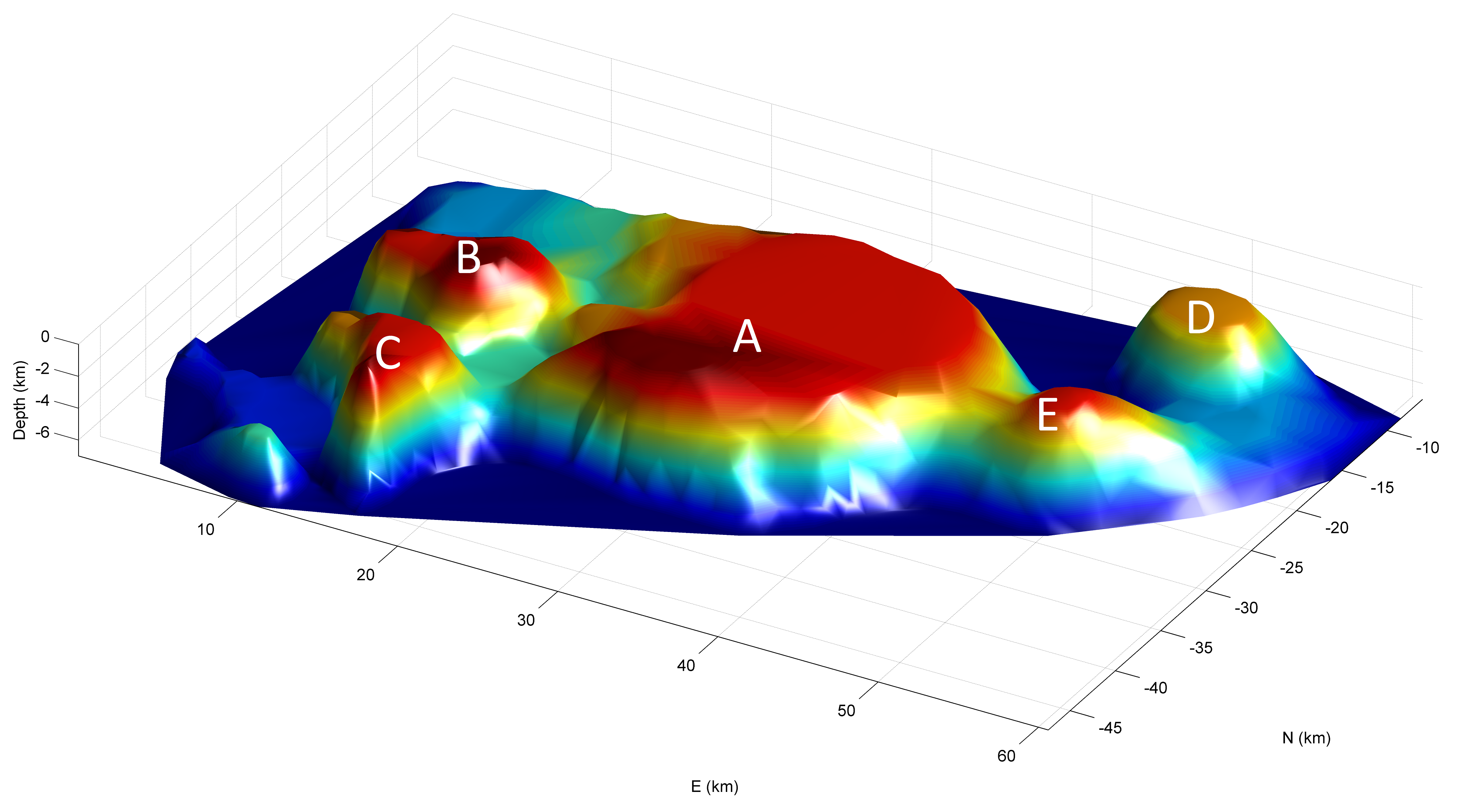
- Type: Batholith
- Unit of: Northern England Devonian Plutonic Suite
- Thickness: 10 km (at maximum)

Lithology
- Primary: Granite

Location
- Region: Northeastern England
- Country: United Kingdom

The North Pennine Batholith, also known as the Weardale Granite, is a granitic batholith lying under northeast England, emplaced around 400 million years ago in the early Devonian. The batholith consists of five plutons, the Tynehead, Scordale, Rowlands Gill, Cornsay and Weardale plutons. The Weardale Granite pluton is the largest and the only one that has been proved (sampled), after the Rookhope Borehole confirmed Martin Bott's hypothesis that a large negative gravity anomaly under Weardale represented a low-density igneous intrusion.

== History of study ==
A schematic block diagram of the North Pennine Batholith, adapted from Kimbell et al. (2010)

In 1934, Kingsley Dunham published a paper proposing that ore deposits in the Alston Block were formed due to a granite intrusion beneath Weardale. This was later tested by a gravity survey, which found a large negative gravity anomaly, supporting the hypothesis.

In the early 1960s, a borehole was drilled at Rookhope by Durham University, and proved the existence of the intrusion at a depth of 390 m. The intrusion was found to have a weathered top, so couldn't account for the mineralisation that was the basis of the hypothesis that first suggested its existence.

In 2004, a second borehole was drilled in Eastgate, and the granite was reached at 270 m below the surface

== See also ==
- Whin Sill, another large igneous intrusion in northeast England.
