= Alston Block =

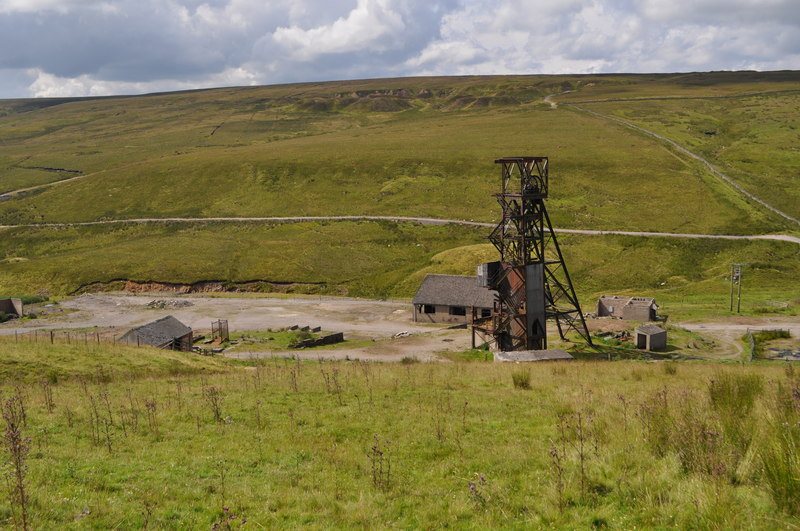
Groverake Mine, Rookhope

The Alston Block is a term used by geologists to describe the geological structure of the North Pennines of northern England and which forms a part of the Pennine Block & Basin Province which originated during the Carboniferous period. It is defined by the Stublick and Ninety Fathom faults to the north, the Pennine Fault to the west and the Stainmore Trough to the south. It is in essence a horst underlain by the Weardale Granite which provides sufficient buoyancy to maintain this piece of the upper crust as an area of raised relief. To its west lies the Vale of Eden and to its north is the half-graben of the Northumberland Trough. The area is also known for its mineral wealth.

== See also ==
Geological Structure of Great Britain
